= Chronicle Xtra =

Chronicle Xtra (formerly the Chester Mail and Midweek Chronicle) is a free weekly newspaper in Chester, England, by Trinity Mirror. The paper is produced in conjunction with the weekly Chester Chronicle. It frequently advertises competitions run by the Chronicle in order to boost sales of this paper.

== History ==
The editorial of the newspaper, which was known as the Chester Mail until June 2006, has been revised several times. Presently Xtra previews the paid-for Chester Chronicle which is published on a Thursday. Xtra is delivered, free of charge, to every address in Chester on a Tuesday or Wednesday.

The Chester Mail, which was almost advertisements, was superseded by the Midweek Chronicle in 2006. The relaunch resulted in more news stories, a comments and letters section, as well as sport and advertorial.

In 2010 the Midweek Chronicle became the Chronicle Xtra. It remains one of three newspapers in available in the Chester area: the Chester Standard, the Chester Chronicle and the daily Chester Evening Leader.

Chronicle Xtra had a circulation of 35,884 in the last six months of 2012.
