= Evening Leader =

Evening Leader is the name of several newspapers. It may refer to:

- Chester Evening Leader in the United Kingdom
- Wrexham Evening Leader in the United Kingdom
- Flintshire Evening Leader in the United Kingdom
- The Leader (Corning), formerly called The Evening Leader, in Corning, New York, United States
- The Evening Leader (Staunton), in the United States
- The Evening Leader, in St. Marys, Ohio, United States
