= Chester Chronicle =

UK newspaper

- Type: Weekly newspaper
- Owner: Reach plc
- Founder: John Poole
- Founded: 1775
- Circulation: 1,370 (as of 2023)
- Website: cheshire-live.co.uk

Chester Chronicle is a local weekly newspaper distributed in Chester, Cheshire and North Wales. The first edition was published by founder John Poole on 2 May 1775. Editions are published every Thursday. In 2018, it had a circulation of 7,023. In June 2019, its owners Reach plc closed the paper's Chester offices ending a 244-year association with the city, the decision was "to reduce costs and save jobs". The newspaper editorial is now produced remotely and from newsdesks in Liverpool and Manchester.

== Publications ==
The Chester Chronicle editorial editions have included:

- Chester City
- Chester County
- Frodsham & Helsby
- Flintshire

The newspaper, which was traditionally printed as a broadsheet, switched to a tabloid format in line with other Trinity Mirror newspapers in 2006. In June of the same year, a Wirral edition was discontinued. The following month, a Flintshire edition was created by merging the Deeside, Mold & Buckley and Flint & Holywell editions. While the Flintshire Chronicle is considered part of the Chester Chronicle series for purposes of advertising, sales and promotions, its editorial content is entirely separate. Since June 2006, the City edition no longer carries the word 'City' on the masthead. A complimentary newspaper, Chronicle Xtra, was published until 2015.

== Archives ==
Historical copies of the Chester Chronicle, dating back to 1775, are available to search and view in digitized form at The British Newspaper Archive.
