= Chester and District Standard =

UK newspaper

Chester Standard
- Type: Weekly newspaper
- Owner(s): NWN Media (until 2019); Gannet (2019-present)
- Founded: 1980s
- Website: chesterstandard.co.uk

The Chester Standard is a weekly free newspaper in Chester, Cheshire. The paper was originally published by North Wales Weekly News (NWN Media) as a sister publication to the Chester Evening Leader. Since it was deregistered by NWN Media from newspaper circulations, its readership is unknown. The weekly newspaper was delivered free to residents until July 2017 before switiching to being sold in retailers.

The Chester Standard was voted by the UK's Newspaper Society the Free Weekly Newspaper of the Year in the North West, North East and Yorkshire 2008.

In January 2019, NWN Media – which was founded in May 1920 – was dissolved and folded into Gannett, an American mass media holding company. In recent years, the newspaper has switched much of its output from print to its online website.
