= Abbot's Meads =

Coordinates: 53.206724°N 2.901494°W

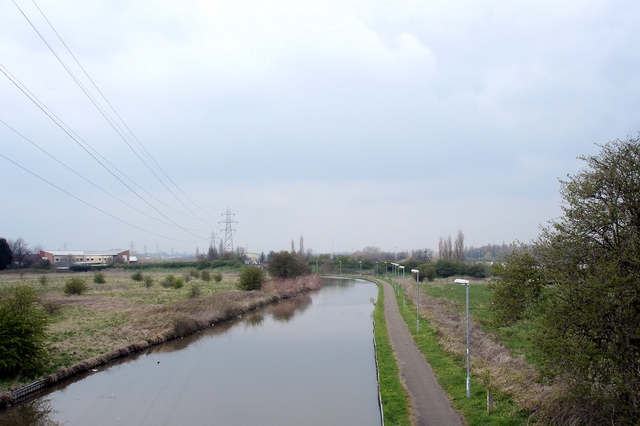
- Shropshire Union Canal at Abbot's Meads

- Location within Cheshire
- OS grid reference: SJ3967
- Unitary authority: Cheshire West and Chester
- Ceremonial county: Cheshire
- Region: North West
- Country: England
- Sovereign state: United Kingdom
- Police: Cheshire
- Fire: Cheshire
- Ambulance: North West

Abbot's Meads is a suburb of Chester in Cheshire, England. Abbot's Meads is north-west of Chester city centre. The Countess of Chester Hospital is nearby. The population as taken in the 2011 census can be found under Chester.

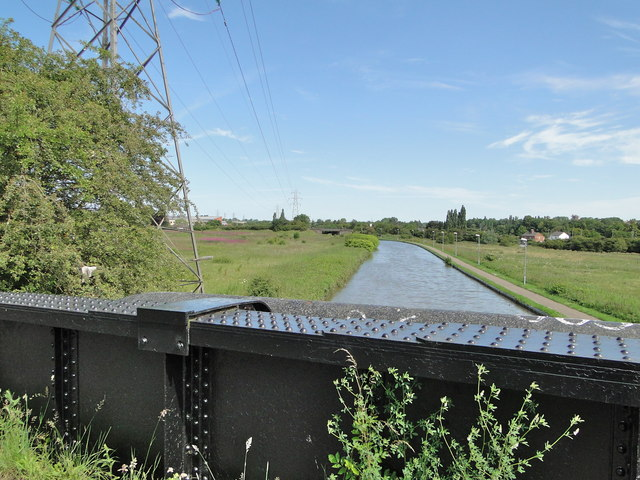
Abbot's Meads from the bridge © Tim Evans
