= Quaintways =

Defunct nightclub in Chester, England

Coordinates: 53.19085°N 2.89140°W

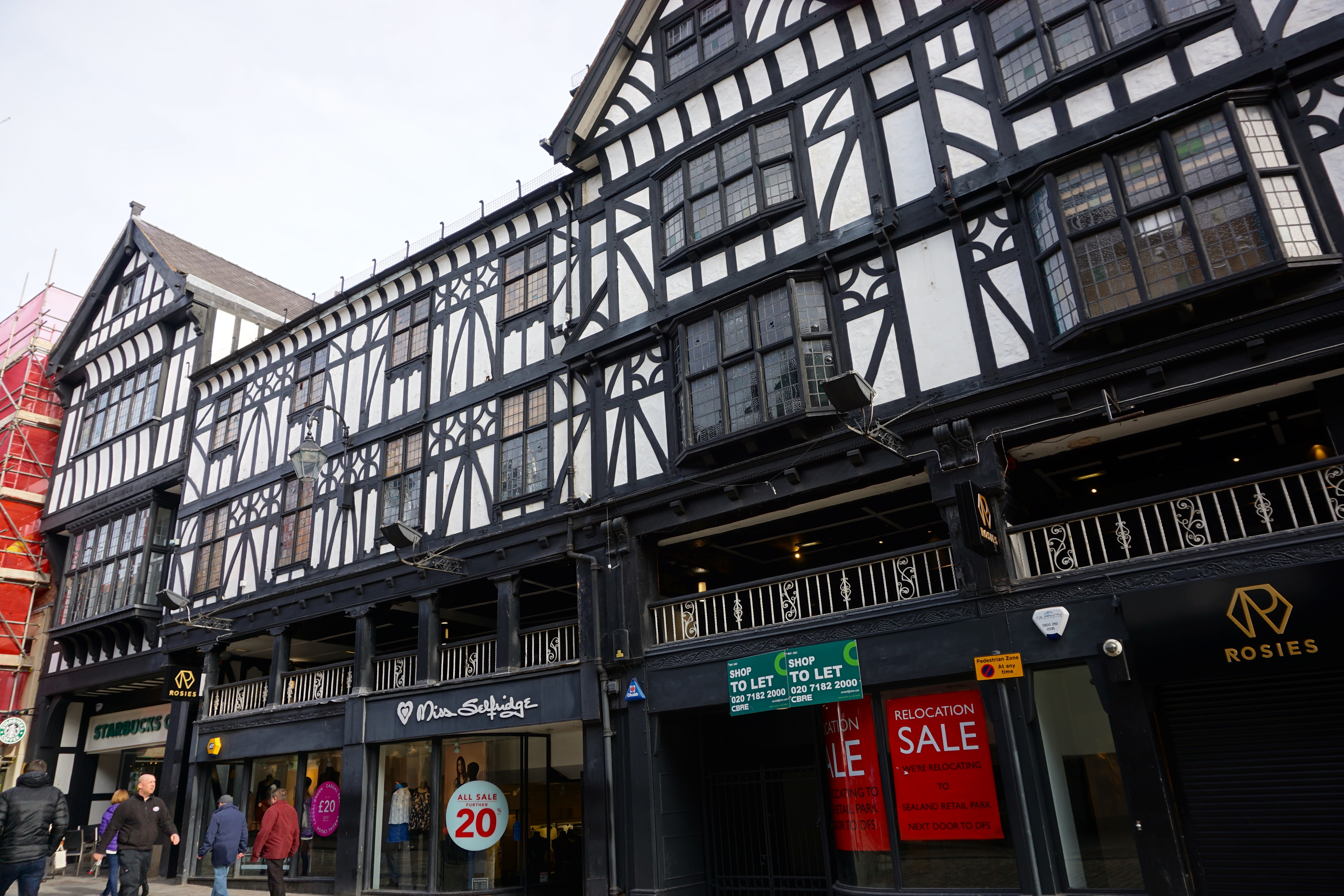
The site of Quaintways, now occupied by Rosies (right)

Quaintways was a nightclub and music venue located at Northgate Street in Chester, England. It was owned and operated by entrepreneur Gordon Vickers. During its heyday of the 1960s and 1970s it hosted bands such as Slade, Fleetwood Mac, Thin Lizzy, Status Quo, Dire Straits, Uriah Heep, Judas Priest and the Sex Pistols.
