= Chester =

City in Cheshire, England

- City
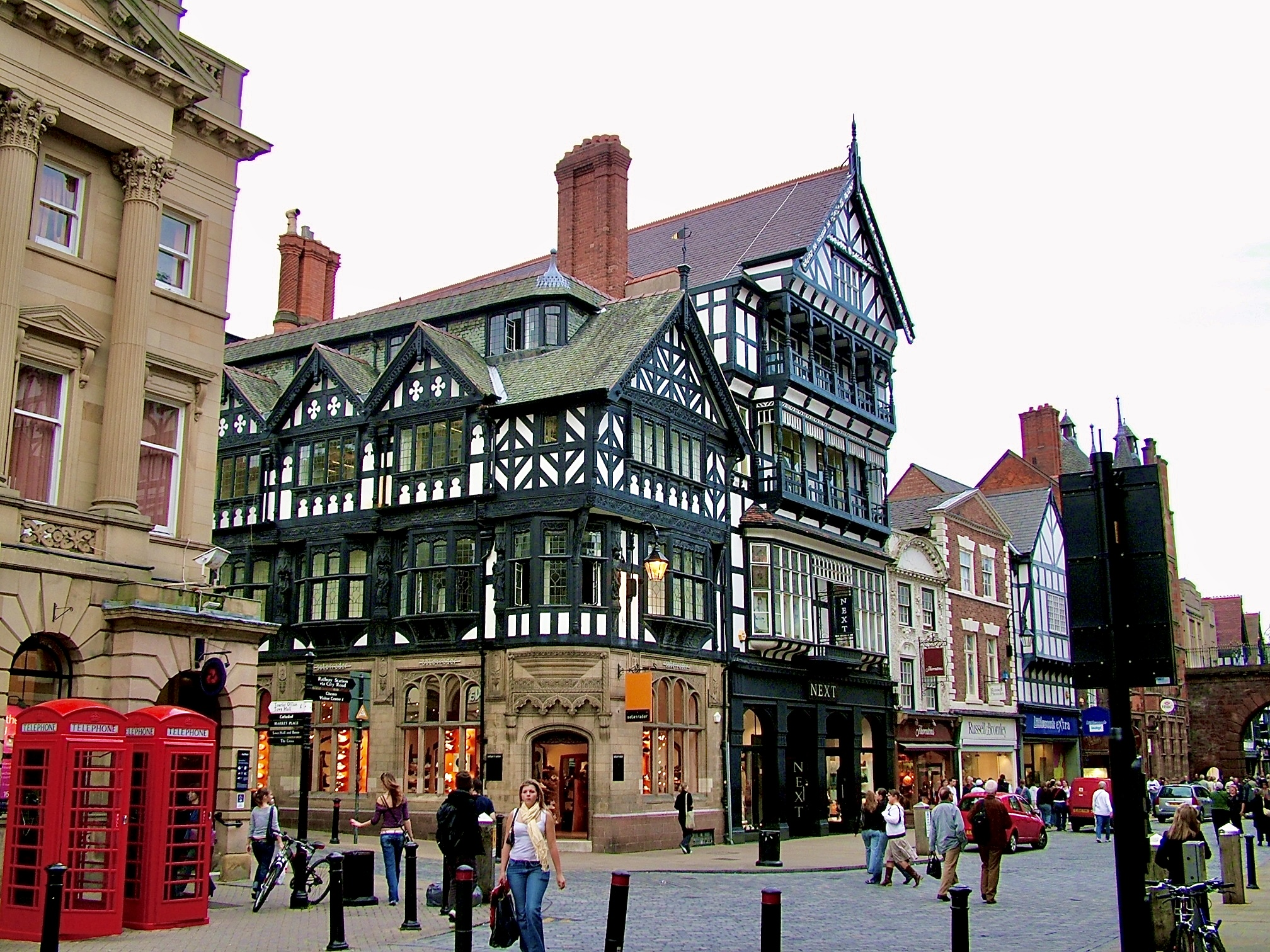
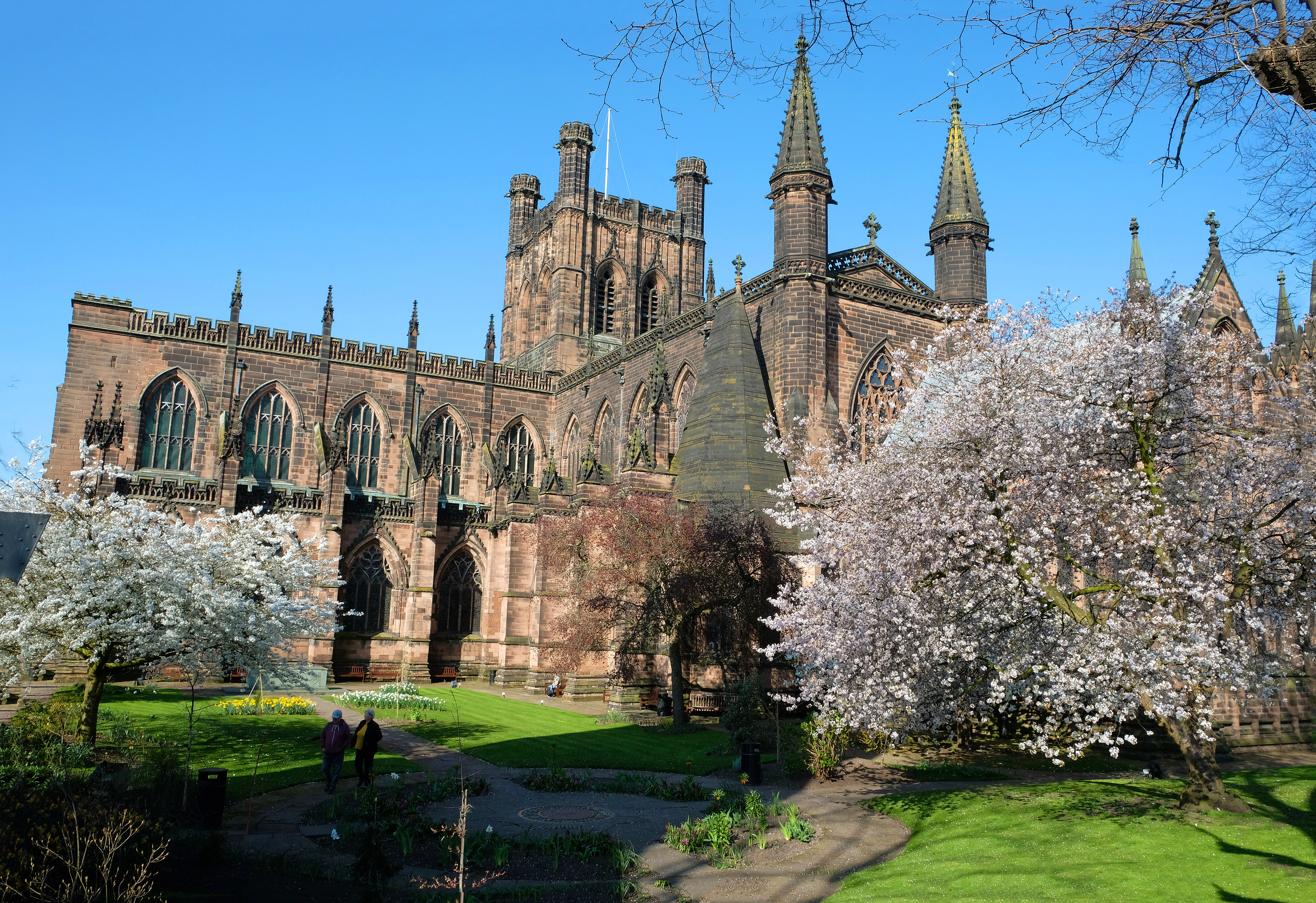
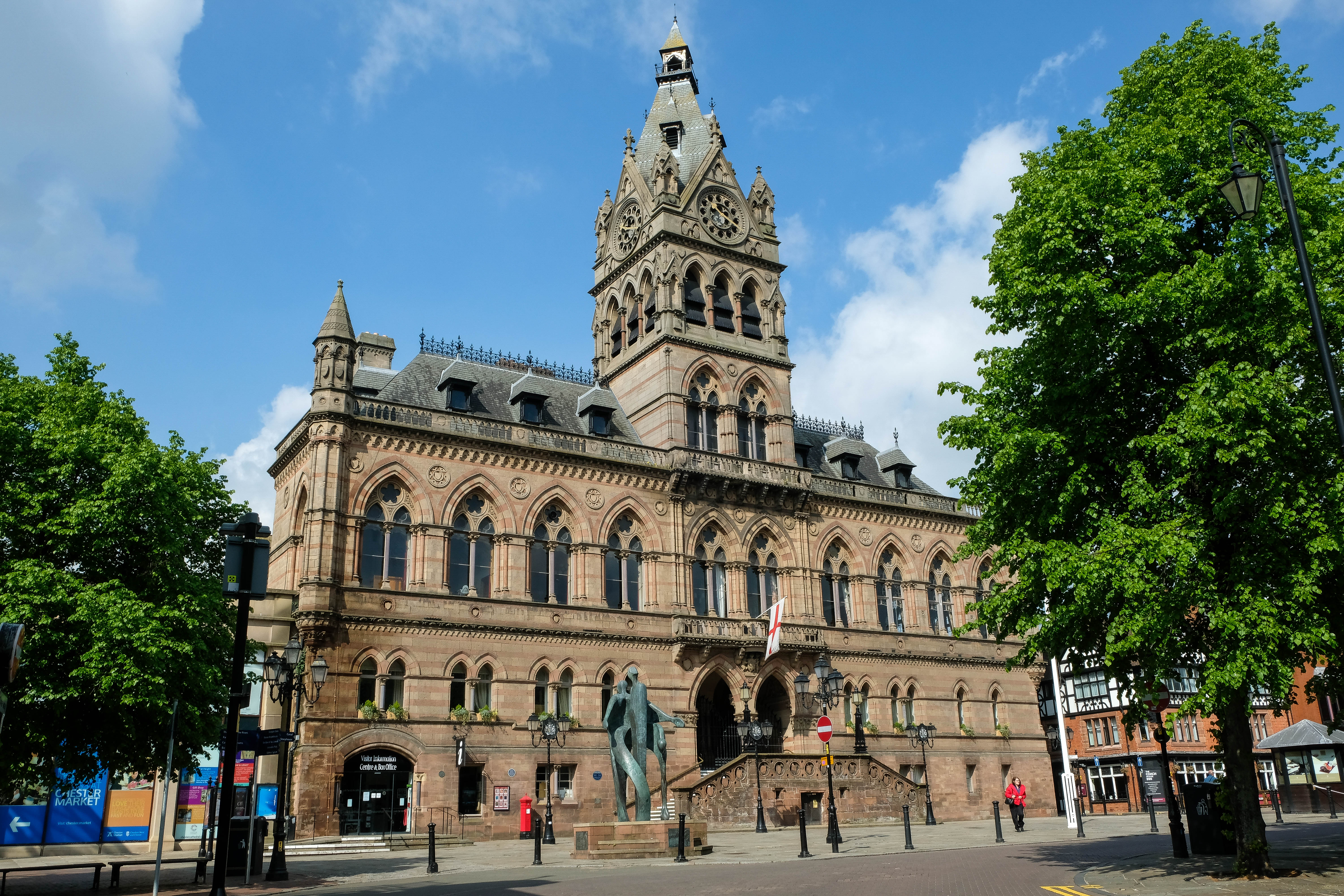
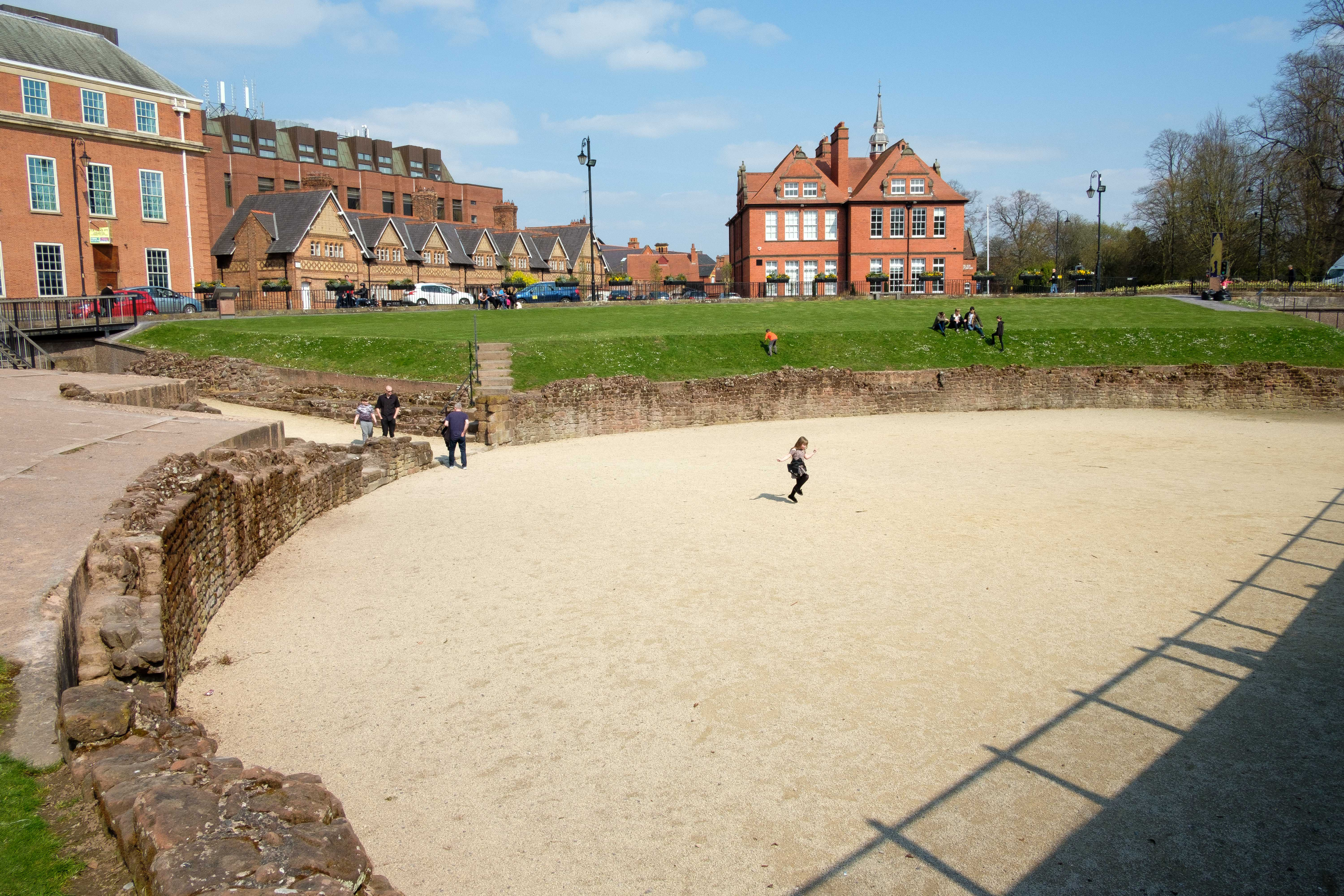
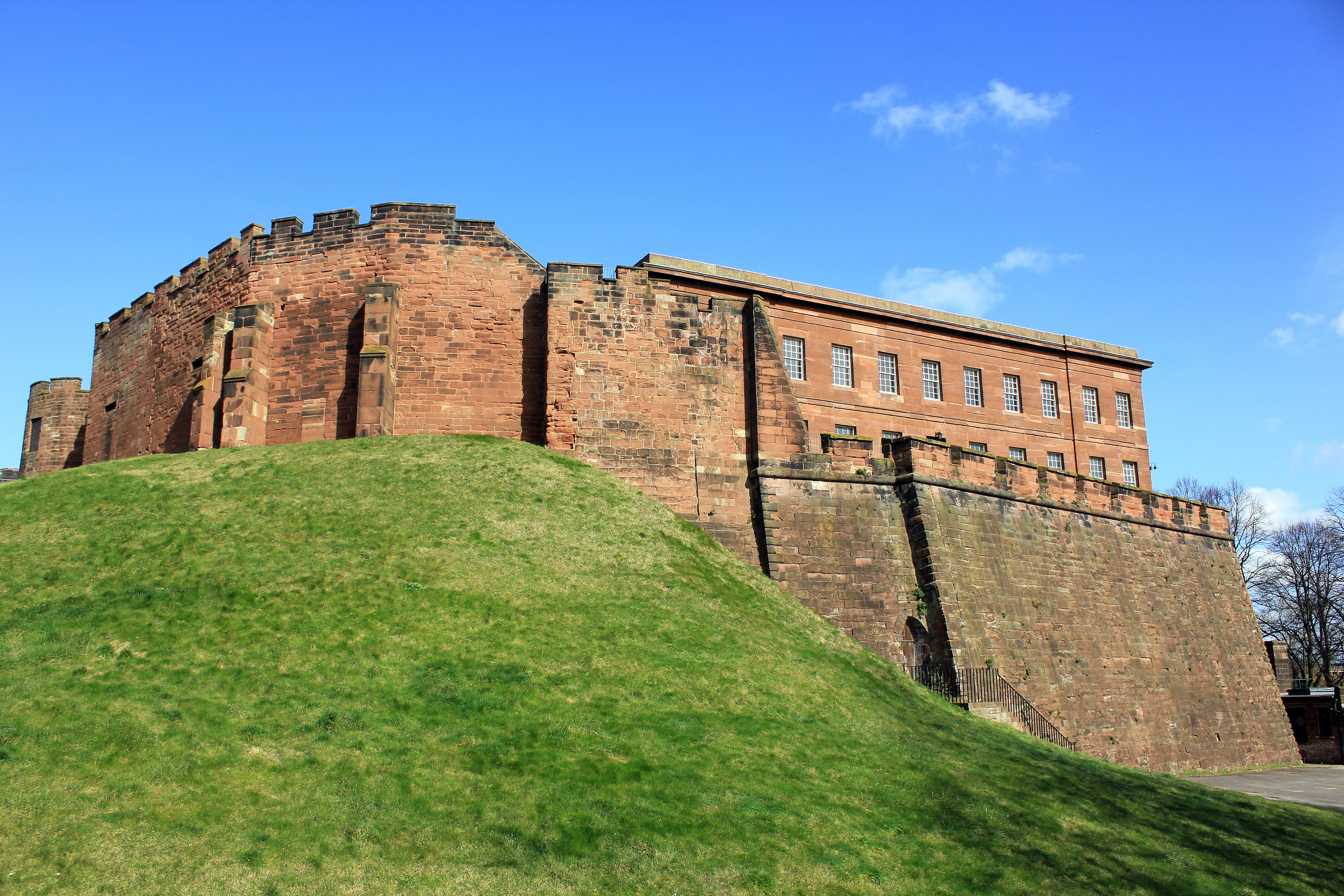
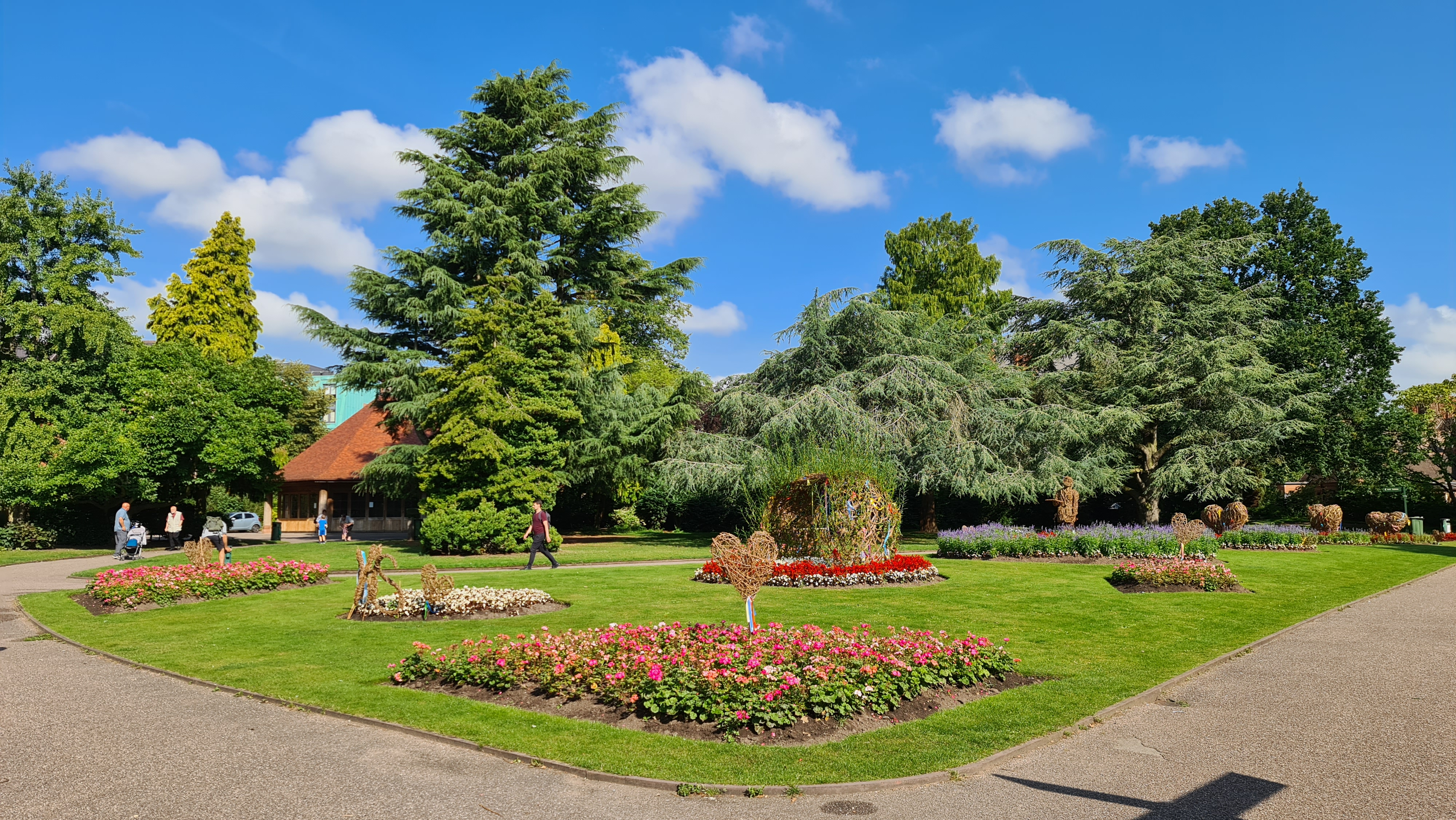
- Eastgate Street Cathedral Town Hall Roman Amphitheatre Castle Grosvenor Park

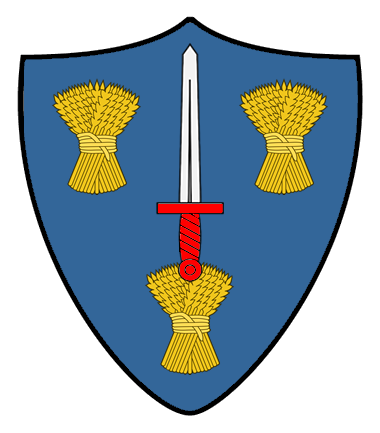
- Coat of arms

- Location within Cheshire
- Population: 92,760 (Built up area, 2021)
- Demonym: Cestrian
- OS grid reference: SJ405665
  - London: 165 mi (266 km) SE
- Unitary authority: Cheshire West and Chester
- Ceremonial county: Cheshire
- Region: North West
- Country: England
- Sovereign state: United Kingdom
- Areas of the city: List: Abbot's Meads; Blacon; Boughton; Boughton Heath; Caughall (Village); Christleton (Village); City Centre; Curzon Park; Great Boughton; Handbridge; Hoole; Huntington; Lache; Moston (Village); Newton; Piper's Ash; Saltney (Town) (Part); Sealand (Village) (Part); The Dale; Upton-by-Chester; Upton Heath; Vicars Cross; Westminster Park
- Post town: CHESTER
- Postcode district: CH1–4
- Dialling code: 01244
- Police: Cheshire
- Fire: Cheshire
- Ambulance: North West
- UK Parliament: Chester North and Neston; Chester South and Eddisbury

Chester is a cathedral city in Cheshire, England, on the River Dee, very close to the England–Wales border. It had a built-up area population of 92,760 in 2021, it is the most populous settlement in the borough of Cheshire West and Chester. It is the historic county town of Cheshire and the second-largest settlement in Cheshire after Warrington.

Chester was founded in the 70s AD as a "castrum" or Roman fort with the name Deva Victrix during the reign of Emperor Vespasian. One of the main army camps in Roman Britain, Deva later became a major civilian settlement. In 689, King Æthelred of Mercia founded the Minster Church of West Mercia, which later became Chester's first cathedral, and the Angles extended and strengthened the walls to protect the city against the Danes. Chester was one of the last cities in England to fall to the Normans, and William the Conqueror ordered the construction of a castle to dominate the town and the nearby Welsh border. Chester was granted city status in 1541.

The city walls of Chester are some of the best-preserved in the country and have Grade I listed status. Apart from a 100-metre (330 ft) section, the walls are almost complete. It has several medieval buildings. However, many of the black-and-white buildings within the city centre are Victorian restorations, originating from the Black-and-white Revival movement. The Industrial Revolution brought railways, canals, and new roads to the city, which saw substantial expansion and development; Chester Town Hall and the Grosvenor Museum are examples of Victorian architecture from this period. Tourism, the retail industry, public administration, and financial services are important to the modern economy. Chester signs itself as Chester International Heritage City on road signs on the main roads entering the city.

== History ==
Charles Leigh concluded in 1701 that there was probably a British city called Genuina (or Gunia) before the arrival of the Romans.

=== Roman ===
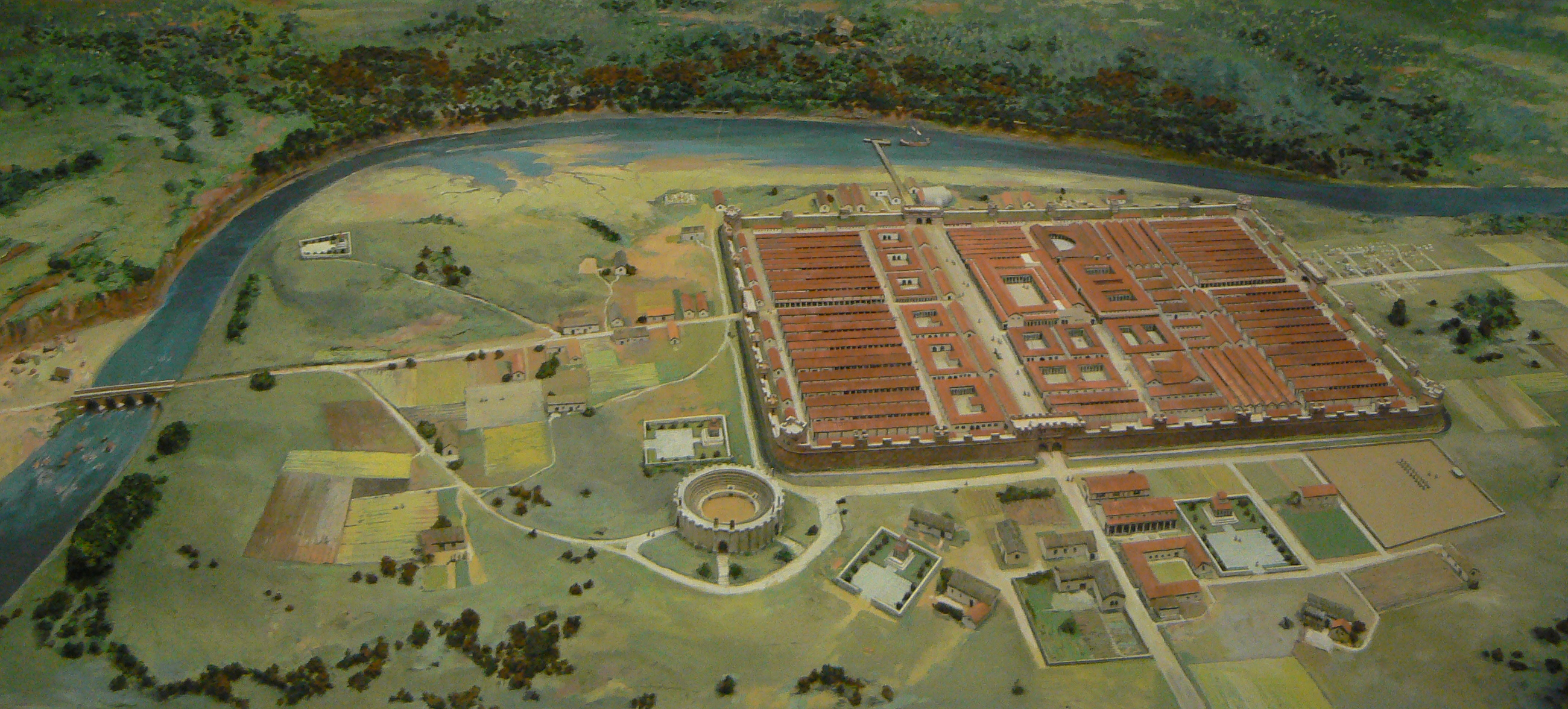
Diorama of the Roman Legionary fortress Deva Victrix in Grosvenor Museum, Chester

The Roman Legio II Adiutrix during the reign of the Emperor Vespasian founded Chester around 75 AD as a "castrum" or Roman fort with the name Deva Victrix. It was established in the land of the Celtic Cornovii, according to the ancient cartographer Ptolemy, as a fortress during the Roman expansion northward, and was named Deva either after the goddess of the Dee, or directly from the British name for the river. The 'victrix' part of the name was taken from the title of the Legio XX Valeria Victrix which was based at Deva. Central Chester's four main roads, Eastgate, Northgate, Watergate and Bridge Street, follow routes laid out at this time.

A civilian settlement grew around the military base, which probably originated from trade with the fortress. The fortress was 20% larger than other fortresses in the Roman province of Britannia built around the same time at York (Eboracum) and Caerleon (Isca Augusta); this has led to the suggestion that the fortress, rather than London (Londinium), was intended to become the capital of the Roman province of Britannia Superior. The civilian amphitheatre, which was built in the 1st century, could seat between 8,000 and 10,000 people. It is the largest known military amphitheatre in Britain, and is also a Scheduled Monument. The Minerva Shrine in the Roman quarry is the only rock-cut Roman shrine still in situ in Britain.

The fortress was garrisoned by the legion until at least the late 4th century. Although the army had abandoned the fortress by 410 when the Romans retreated from Britannia, the Romano-British civilian settlement continued (probably with some Roman veterans staying behind with their wives and children) and its occupants probably continued to use the fortress and its defences as protection from raiders from the Irish Sea.

=== Medieval ===
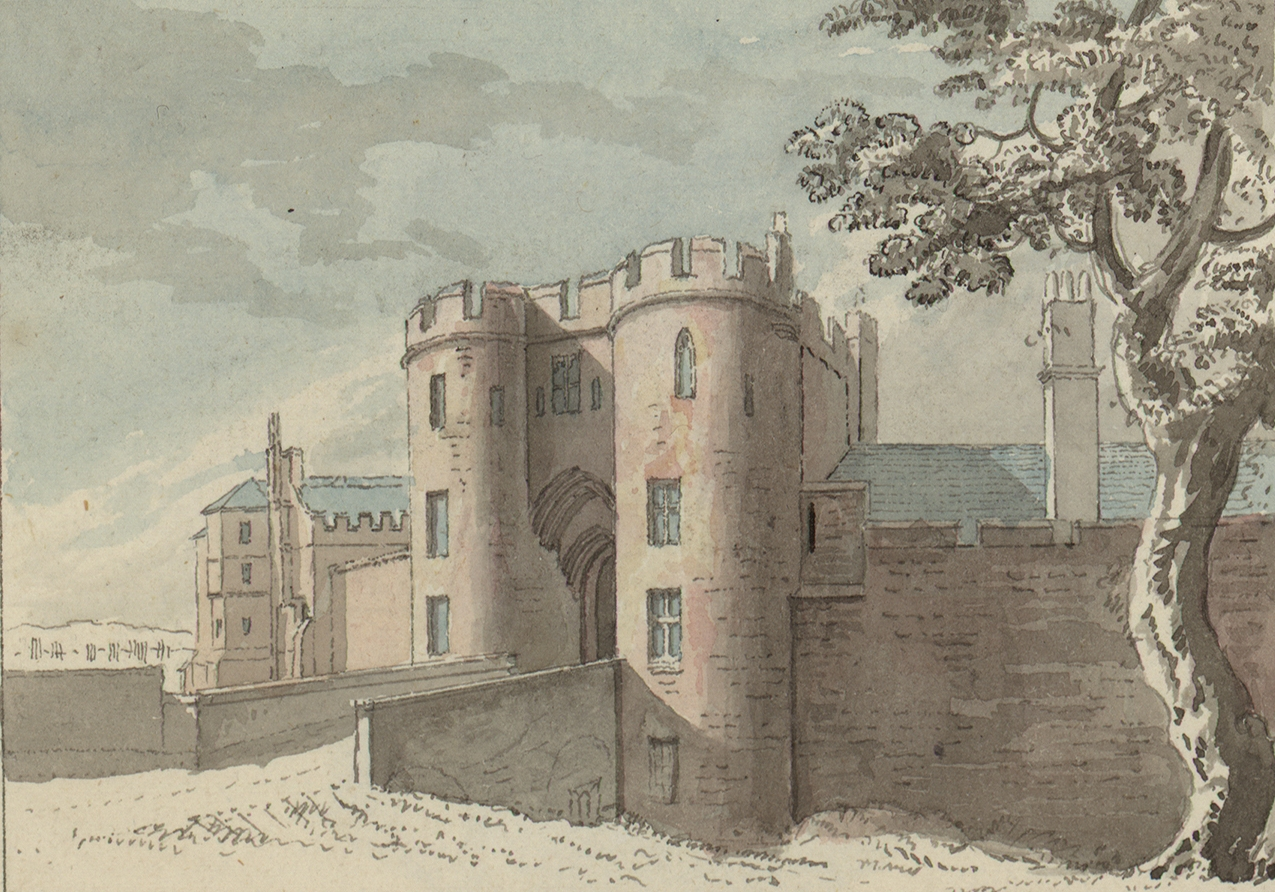
Castle Gate, Chester c. 1781

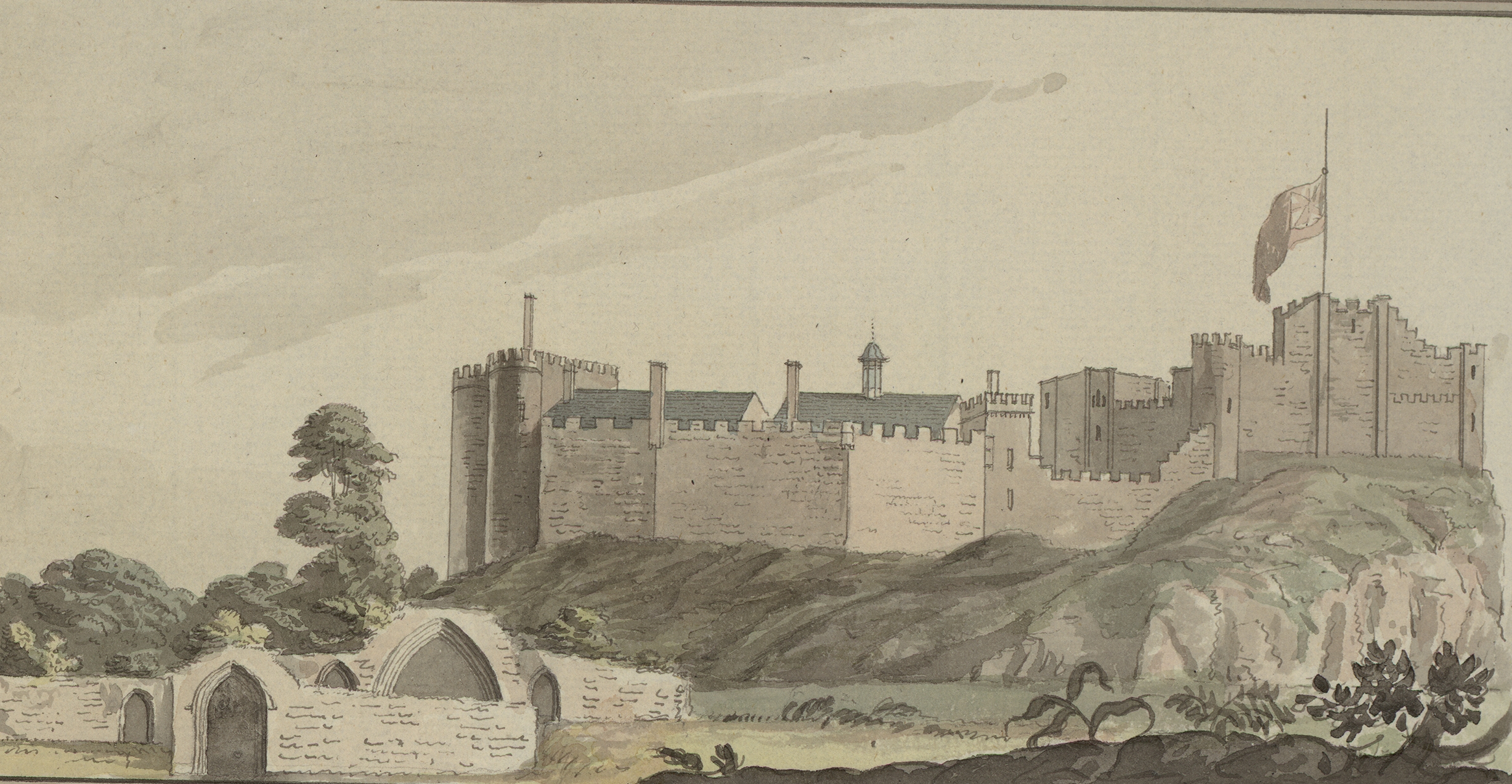
Chester Castle c. 1781

After the Roman troops withdrew, the Romano-British established several petty kingdoms. Chester is thought to have become part of the kingdom of Powys. Deverdoeu was a Welsh name for Chester as late as the 12th century (cf Dyfrdwy, Welsh for the river Dee). Another, attested in the 9th-century History of the Britons traditionally attributed to Nennius, is Cair Legion ("Fort" or "City of the Legion"); this later developed into Caerlleon and then the modern Welsh Caer. (The town's importance is noted by its taking the simpler form in each case, while Isca Augusta in Monmouthshire, another important legionary base, was known first as Caerleon on the Usk, and now as Caerleon). King Arthur is said to have fought his ninth battle at the "city of the legions" (Caerlleon) and later St Augustine came to the city to try to unite the church, and held his synod with the Welsh Bishops.

In 616, Æthelfrith of Northumbria defeated a Welsh army at the brutal and decisive Battle of Chester and probably established the Anglo-Saxon position in the area from then on. The Northumbrian Anglo-Saxons used an Old English equivalent of the British name, Legacæstir, which was current until the 11th century, when, in a further parallel with Welsh usage, the first element fell out of use and the simple name Chester emerged. In 689, King Æthelred of Mercia founded the Minster Church of West Mercia on what is considered to be an early Christian site: it is known as the Minster of St John the Baptist, Chester (now St John's Church) which later became the first cathedral. Much later, the body of Æthelred's niece, St Werburgh, was removed from Hanbury in Staffordshire in the 9th century and, to save it from desecration by Danish marauders was reburied in the Church of SS Peter & Paul – later to become the Abbey Church (the present cathedral). Her name is still remembered in St Werburgh's Street, which passes alongside the cathedral, and near the city walls, and in St Werburgh's Roman Catholic church in Grosvenor Park Road.

The Anglo-Saxons extended and strengthened the walls of Chester to protect the city against the Danes, who occupied it for a short time until Alfred seized all the cattle and laid waste on the surrounding land to drive them out. It was Alfred's daughter Æthelflæd, Lady of the Mercians, that built the new Anglo-Saxon burh. A new Church dedicated to St Peter alone was founded in AD 907 by the Lady Æthelfleda at what was to become the Cross. In around 907, the Vikings laid siege to Chester, but the Anglo-Saxon defenders, led by Æthelfleda, successfully fought them off. In 973, the Anglo-Saxon Chronicle records that, two years after his coronation at Bath, King Edgar of England came to Chester where he held his court in a palace in a place now known as Edgar's Field near the old Dee bridge in Handbridge. Taking the helm of a barge, he was rowed the short distance up the River Dee from Edgar's Field to the great Minster Church of St John the Baptist by six (the monk Henry Bradshaw records he was rowed by eight kings) tributary kings called reguli.

In 1071, King William the Conqueror made Hugh d'Avranches, who built Chester Castle, the first Earl of Chester (second creation). From the 14th to the 18th century, the city's prominent position in North West England meant it was commonly known as Westchester. This name was used by Celia Fiennes when she visited the city in 1698. and is also used in Moll Flanders.

=== Early modern period ===
In the English Civil War, Chester sided with the royalist cause of King Charles I but was subdued by the Parliamentarians in 1643. The Mayor of Chester, Charles Walley, was removed from office and replaced by Alderman William Edwards. Another alderman, Francis Gamull, a royalist MP and former Mayor, was ordered to surrender Dee Mills: they were to be demolished, and new mills built on city land.

=== Industrial history ===
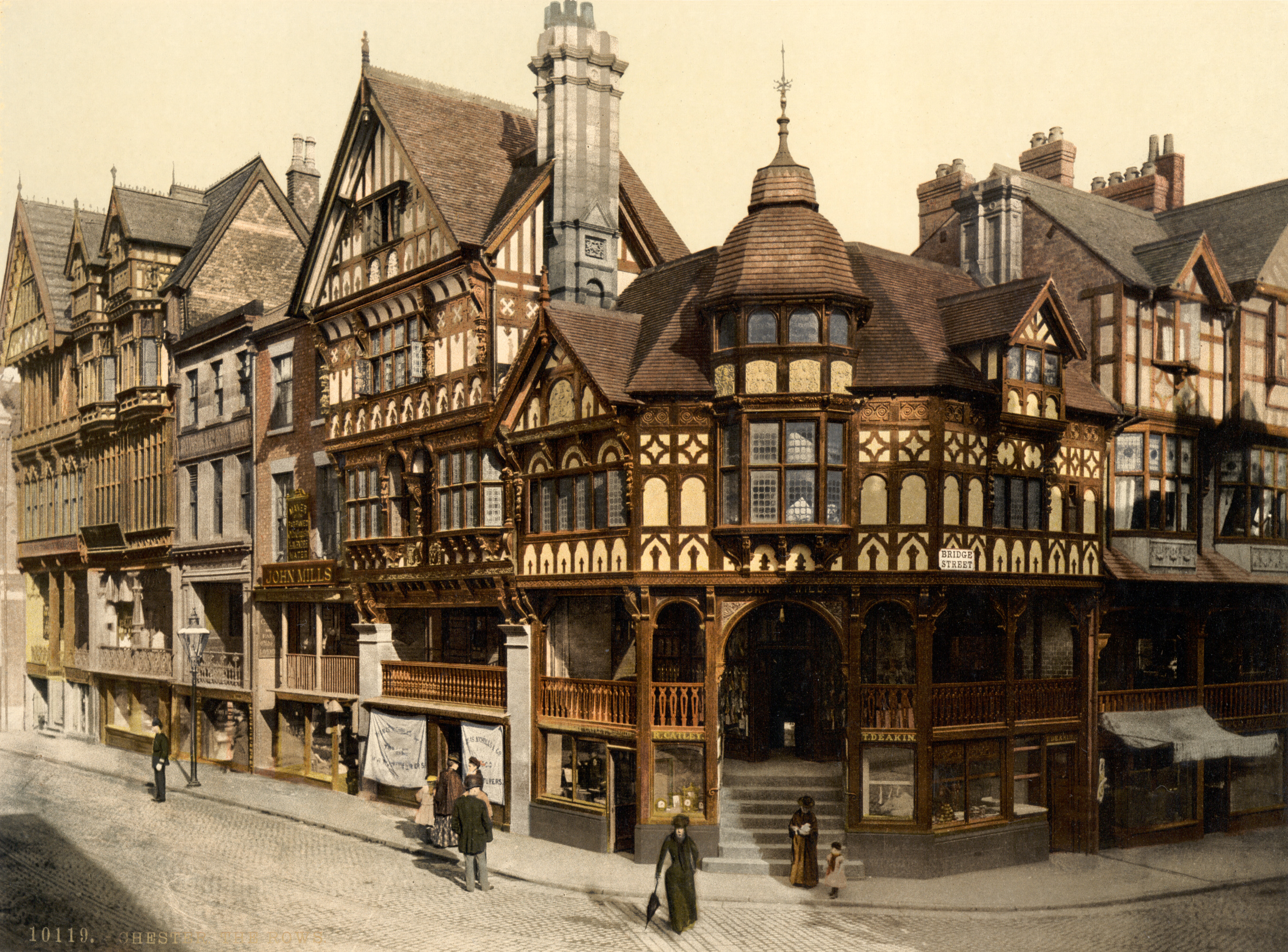
Photochrom of the Chester Rows designed by T.M. Lockwood, as seen from the Cross, 1895

Chester played a significant part in the Industrial Revolution, which began in the North West of England in the late 18th century. The city village of Newtown, located northeast of the city and bounded by the Shropshire Union Canal, was at the very heart of this industry. The large Chester Cattle Market and the two Chester railway stations, Chester General and Chester Northgate Station, meant that Newtown with its cattle market and canal, and Hoole with its railways were responsible for providing the vast majority of workers and in turn, the vast amount of Chester's wealth production throughout the Industrial Revolution.

The population was 23,115 by 1841.

=== Modern era ===
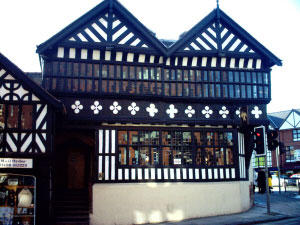
The Falcon Inn after restoration

A considerable amount of land in Chester is owned by The 7th Duke of Westminster who owns an estate, Eaton Hall, near the village of Eccleston. He also has London properties in Mayfair.

Grosvenor is the Duke's family name, which explains such features in the city as the Grosvenor Bridge, the Grosvenor Hotel, and Grosvenor Park. Much of Chester's architecture dates from the Victorian era, many of the buildings being modelled on the Jacobean half-timbered style and designed by John Douglas, who was employed by the Duke as his principal architect. He had a trademark of twisted chimney stacks, many of which can be seen on the buildings in the city centre.

Douglas designed, amongst other buildings, the Grosvenor Hotel and the City Baths. In 1911, Douglas' protégé and city architect James Strong designed the then-active fire station on the west side of Northgate Street. Another feature of all buildings belonging to the estate of Westminster is the 'Grey Diamonds' – a weaving pattern of grey bricks in the red brickwork laid out in a diamond formation.

Towards the end of World War II, a lack of affordable housing meant many problems for Chester. Large areas of farmland on the city's outskirts were developed as residential areas in the 1950s and early 1960s, producing, for instance, the suburb of Blacon. In 1964, a bypass was built through and around the city centre to combat traffic congestion.

These new developments caused local concern as the physicality and, therefore, the feel of the city was being dramatically altered. In 1968, a report by Donald Insall, in collaboration with authorities and government, recommended that historic buildings be preserved in Chester. Consequently, the buildings were used in new and different ways instead of being demolished.

The City Conservation Area was designated in 1969. Over the next twenty years, the emphasis was placed on saving historic buildings, such as The Falcon Inn, Dutch Houses, and Kings Buildings.

On 13 January 2002, Chester was granted the first UK Fairtrade City status by the Fairtrade Foundation. In 2011 this was extended to the entire borough.

== Governance ==
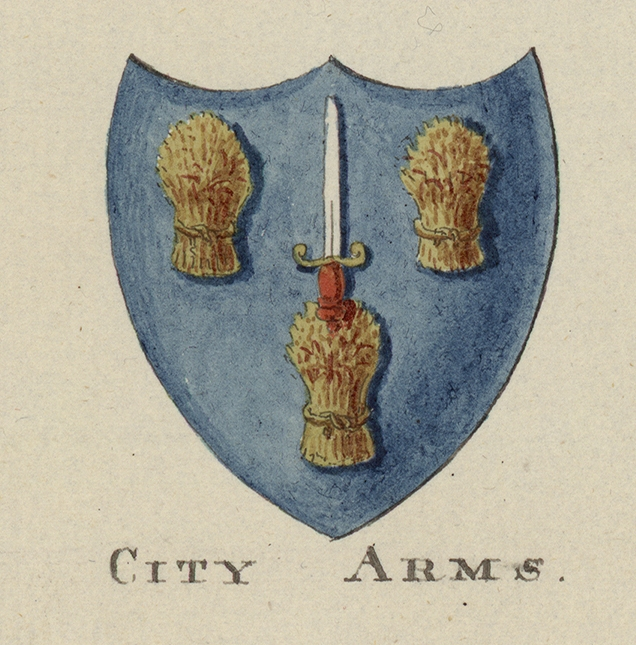
Arms of Chester City

There is one main tier of local government covering Chester, at unitary authority level, being Cheshire West and Chester Council. Much of the Chester urban area is an unparished area, but some of the suburbs are included in civil parishes such as Great Boughton and Upton-by-Chester and there is also a small parish in the centre of the city called Chester Castle.

The built-up area straddles the two parliamentary constituencies of Chester North and Neston and Chester South and Eddisbury.

=== Administrative history ===
Chester was an ancient borough, with its earliest known charters dating from the twelfth century. It was given the right to appoint its own sheriffs in 1506, making it a county corporate, outside the jurisdiction of the Sheriff of Cheshire. The borough gained city status in 1541 following the creation of the Diocese of Chester. The borough was reformed to become a municipal borough in 1836 under the Municipal Corporations Act 1835, which standardised the way many boroughs operated across the country. As part of the 1836 reforms the borough was enlarged beyond its medieval boundaries to include the Boughton area.

When elected county councils were created in 1889, Chester was considered large enough for its existing borough council to provide county-level services. It was therefore made a county borough, independent from Cheshire County Council. The borough was enlarged in 1936, when it absorbed Blacon, and again in 1954, when it absorbed Hoole. The county borough was abolished in 1974, merging with the former Chester Rural District and Tarvin Rural District which covered the surrounding rural areas to create a new Chester district, which was a district-level authority with Cheshire County Council providing county-level services. Chester's city status was extended to cover the whole of the district created in 1974. In 1992, Chester City Council was given the right to appoint a Lord Mayor.

Chester City Council was abolished in 2009 when local government across Cheshire was reorganised; Cheshire County Council was also abolished, and the three districts of Chester, Ellesmere Port and Neston and Vale Royal merged to form a unitary authority called Cheshire West and Chester. Charter trustees were established to maintain Chester's city status and appoint the Lord Mayor. Chester's city status is now formally held by the area of the charter trustees, comprising the 15 wards of Cheshire West and Chester which correspond to the area of the pre-2009 Chester City Council. The official city therefore includes rural areas beyond Chester's built-up area, and had a total population of 138,875 at the 2021 census, compared to 92,760 for the built-up area.

== Geography ==
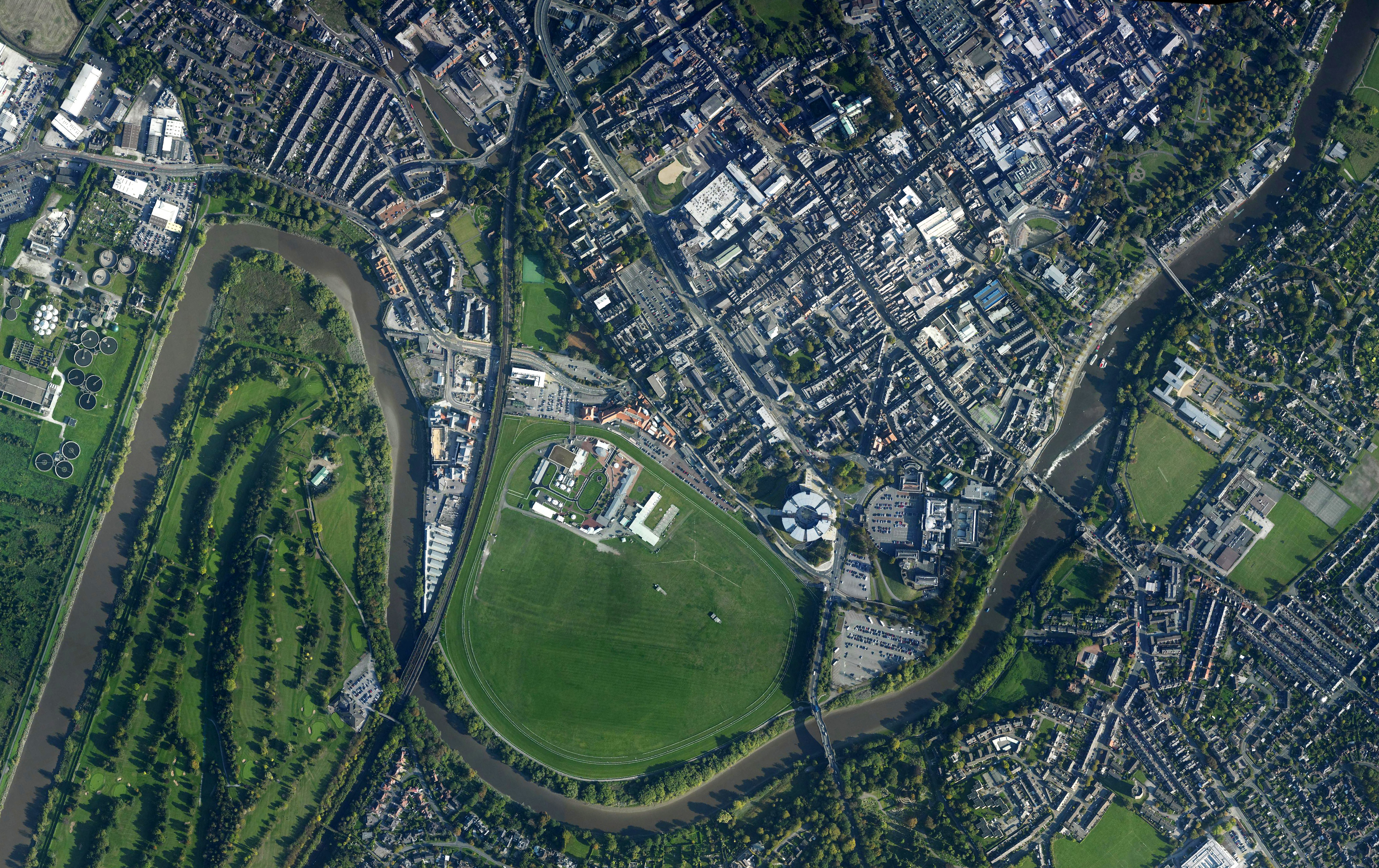
An aerial photograph of central Chester and the River Dee

Chester lies at the southern end of a 2-mile (3.2 km) Triassic sandstone ridge, rising to a height of 42 m within a natural S-bend in the River Dee (before the course was altered in the 18th century). The bedrock, also known as the Chester Pebble Beds, is notable for the many small stones trapped within its strata. Retreating glacial sheet ice also deposited quantities of sand and marl across the area where boulder clay was absent.

The eastern and northern parts of Chester consisted of heathland and forest. The western side towards the Dee Estuary was marsh and wetland habitats.

=== Climate ===
Chester has an oceanic climate (Köppen: Cfb), typical of the British Isles but more susceptible to cold than the extreme south. Despite its proximity to the Irish Sea, the temperature regime is similar to areas further inland, owing to the shelter provided by the Pennines to the northeast and the Welsh Mountains to the southwest. The nearest official weather station is at Hawarden Airport, about 4 miles (6.4 km) west of the city centre.

The absolute maximum temperature recorded was 37.1 °C (98.8 °F) on 18 July 2022, the highest temperature reported in Wales. In an average year, the warmest day should reach 29.3 °C (84.7 °F), and 12.0 days in total should attain a temperature of 25.1 °C (77.2 °F) or higher. Given the correctly aligned breezy conditions, a föhn effect will operate, meaning local temperatures are somewhat higher than the surrounding area.

The absolute minimum temperature recorded was −18.2 °C (−0.8 °F) during January 1982. Annually, an average of 42.2 air frosts should be recorded.

Annual rainfall is barely over 700mm due to a rain shadow effect caused by the Welsh Mountains. Over 1mm of rain is reported on 135.5 days.

Climate data for Hawarden Airport WMO ID: 03321; coordinates 53°10′32″N 2°59′11″W; elevation 10 m (33 ft), 1991–2020 normals, extremes 1901–present. (Note: Data has been collected at Hawarden Bridge for the period 1901–2005 and at Hawarden Airport since 1941.)
Month	Jan	Feb	Mar	Apr	May	Jun	Jul	Aug	Sep	Oct	Nov	Dec	Year
Record high °C (°F)	16.1 (61.0)	17.2 (63.0)	22.2 (72.0)	25.8 (78.4)	32.2 (90.0)	35.1 (95.2)	37.1 (98.8)	35.2 (95.4)	32.3 (90.1)	28.2 (82.8)	19.6 (67.3)	16.7 (62.1)	37.1 (98.8)
Mean daily maximum °C (°F)	8.1 (46.6)	8.8 (47.8)	10.9 (51.6)	13.6 (56.5)	16.7 (62.1)	19.3 (66.7)	21.1 (70.0)	20.7 (69.3)	18.4 (65.1)	14.6 (58.3)	10.9 (51.6)	8.4 (47.1)	14.3 (57.7)
Daily mean °C (°F)	4.9 (40.8)	5.4 (41.7)	7.0 (44.6)	9.1 (48.4)	12.0 (53.6)	14.8 (58.6)	16.6 (61.9)	16.3 (61.3)	14.1 (57.4)	10.9 (51.6)	7.6 (45.7)	5.2 (41.4)	10.3 (50.5)
Mean daily minimum °C (°F)	1.8 (35.2)	2.0 (35.6)	3.0 (37.4)	4.5 (40.1)	7.2 (45.0)	10.3 (50.5)	12.1 (53.8)	12.0 (53.6)	9.8 (49.6)	7.2 (45.0)	4.3 (39.7)	2.1 (35.8)	6.4 (43.5)
Record low °C (°F)	−18.2 (−0.8)	−17.8 (0.0)	−12.4 (9.7)	−3.9 (25.0)	−1.6 (29.1)	−0.3 (31.5)	3.5 (38.3)	2.2 (36.0)	−0.1 (31.8)	−7.2 (19.0)	−9.9 (14.2)	−17.2 (1.0)	−18.2 (−0.8)
Average precipitation mm (inches)	59.9 (2.36)	49.5 (1.95)	48.2 (1.90)	49.5 (1.95)	52.9 (2.08)	64.5 (2.54)	60.0 (2.36)	58.9 (2.32)	62.2 (2.45)	76.2 (3.00)	71.3 (2.81)	75.6 (2.98)	728.8 (28.69)
Average precipitation days	13.0	10.8	11.0	10.2	9.2	10.0	10.0	10.5	10.3	12.7	14.7	14.2	136.7
Mean monthly sunshine hours	63.9	81.6	122.5	177.6	209.1	190.9	199.0	171.2	142.1	90.6	67.9	56.1	1,572.5
Source 1: Met Office Monthly Weather Report
Source 2: Meteo Climat CEDA Archive

== Divisions and suburbs ==
The Chester Urban Area is an urban area surrounding the city of Chester. The urban area includes the town of Saltney in Flintshire, North Wales and the outlying suburbs of Bache, Blacon, Boughton, Curzon Park, Great Boughton, Handbridge, Huntington, Hoole, Kingsway, Lache, Moston, Newton, Newtown, Queens Park, Upton, Vicars Cross and Westminster Park.

Areas just outside the city include: Christleton, Eccleston, Guilden Sutton, Littleton, Mickle Trafford, Mollington, Saughall and Waverton.

== Landmarks and tourist attractions ==
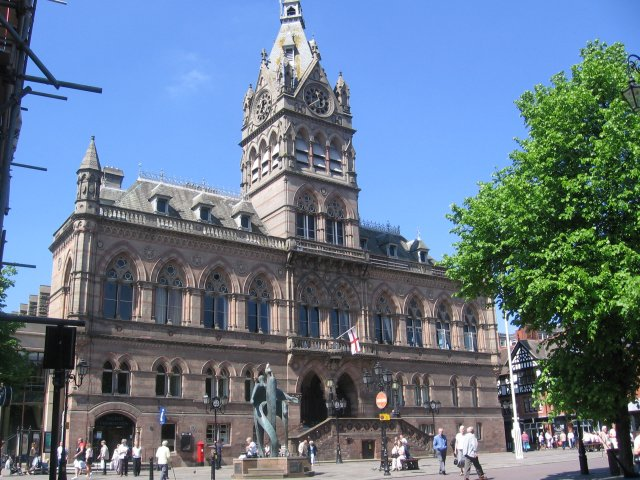
Chester Town Hall

The more unusual landmarks in the city are the city walls, the Rows and the black-and-white architecture. The walls encircle the bounds of the medieval city and constitute the most complete city walls in Britain, the full circuit measuring nearly 2 miles (3 km). The only break in the circuit is in the south-west section in front of County Hall. A footpath runs along the top of the walls, crossing roads by bridges over Eastgate, Northgate, St Martin's Gate, Watergate, Bridgegate, Newgate, and the Wolf Gate, and passing a series of structures, namely Phoenix Tower (or King Charles' Tower), Morgan's Mount, the Goblin Tower (or Pemberton's Parlour) and Bonewaldesthorne's Tower with a spur leading to the Water Tower and Thimbleby's Tower. On Eastgate is Eastgate Clock, which is said to be the most photographed clock face in England after those that share the tower with Big Ben.

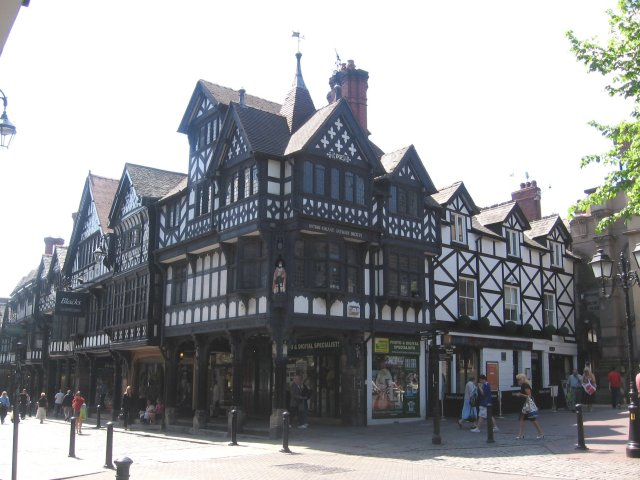
Black-and-white architecture at 29–31 Northgate

The Rows are unique in Britain. They consist of buildings with shops or dwellings on the lowest two storeys. The shops or dwellings on the ground floor are often lower than the street and are entered by steps, which sometimes lead to a crypt-like vault. Those on the first floor are entered behind a continuous walkway, often with a sloping shelf between the walkway and the railings overlooking the street. Much of the architecture of central Chester looks medieval and some of it is, but by far the greater part of it, including most of the black-and-white buildings, is Victorian, a result of what Pevsner termed the "black-and-white revival" pioneered by architects John Douglas and T.M. Lockwood.

The most prominent buildings in the city centre are the town hall and the cathedral. The town hall was opened in 1869. It is in Gothic Revival style and has a tower and a short spire. The cathedral was formerly the church of St Werburgh's Abbey. Its architecture dates back to the Norman era, with additions made most centuries since. A series of major restorations took place in the 19th century, and in 1975, a separate bell tower was opened. The elaborately carved canopies of the choir stalls are considered to be among the finest in the country. Also in the cathedral is the shrine of St Werburgh. The former monastic buildings are north of the cathedral. The oldest church in the city is St John's, which is outside the city walls and was at one time the cathedral church. The church was shortened after the dissolution of the monasteries, and ruins of the former east end remain outside the church. Much of the interior is in Norman style and this is considered to be the best example of 11th–12th-century church architecture in Cheshire. At the intersection of the former Roman roads is Chester Cross, to the north of which is the small church of St Peter's, which is in use as an ecumenical centre. Other churches are now redundant and have other uses: St Michael's in Bridge Street is a heritage centre, St Mary-on-the-Hill is an educational centre, and Holy Trinity now acts as the Guildhall. Other notable buildings include the preserved shot tower, the highest structure in Chester, and St Thomas of Canterbury Church.

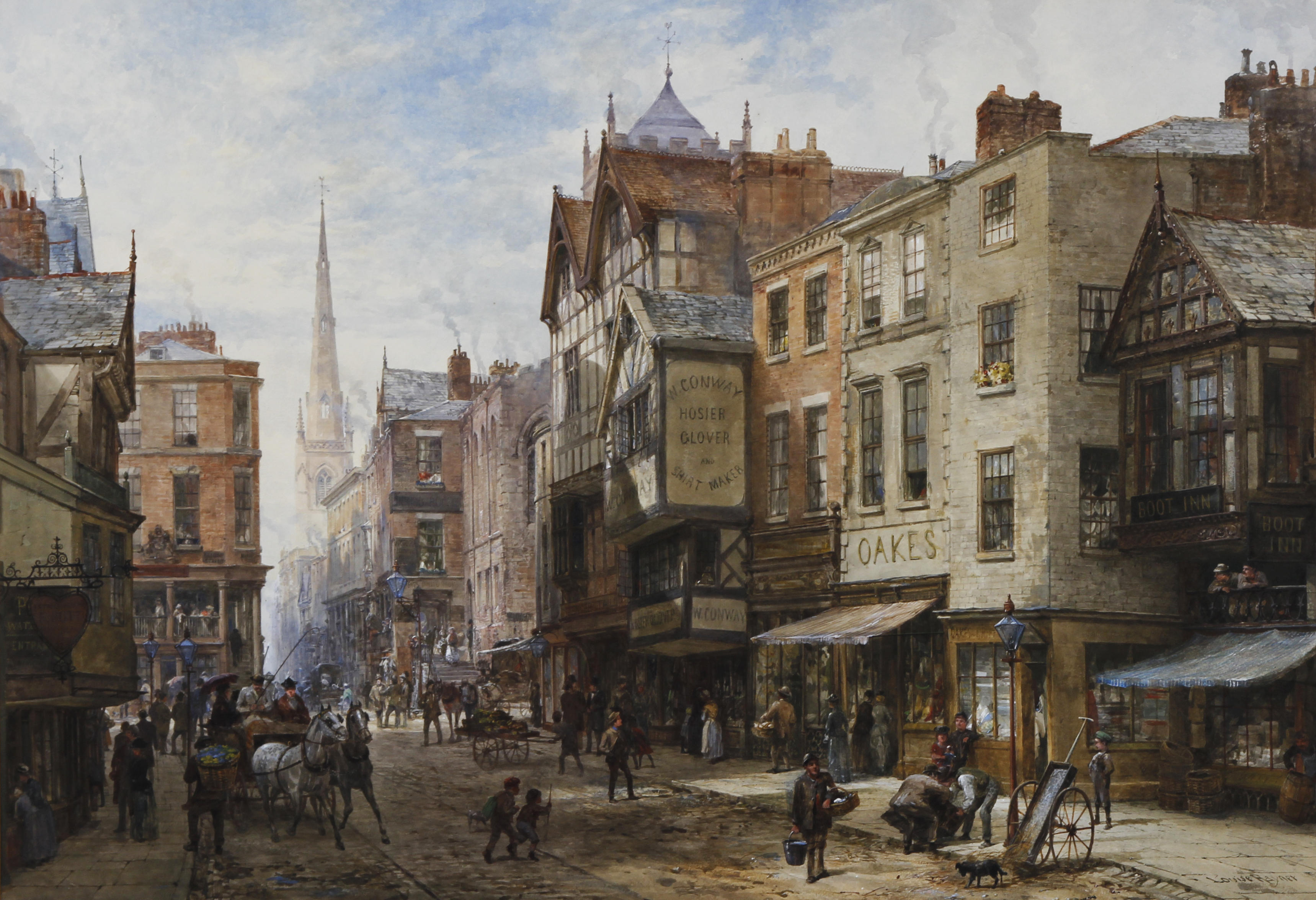
The north side of Eastgate Street painted by Louise Rayner. On the far right is the 17th-century Boot Inn.

Roman remains can still be found in the city, particularly in the basements of some of the buildings and in the lower parts of the northern section of the city walls. The most important Roman feature is the amphitheatre just outside the walls, which underwent archaeological investigation in the early 21st century. Roman artefacts are on display in the Roman Gardens which run parallel to the city walls from Newgate to the River Dee, where there's also a reconstructed hypocaust system. An original hypocaust system discovered in the 1720s can be seen in the basement of 39 Bridge Street, which is open to the public.

Of the original medieval city, the most important surviving structure is Chester Castle, particularly the Agricola Tower. Much of the rest of the castle has been replaced by the neoclassical county court and its entrance, the Propyleum. To the south of the city runs the River Dee, with its 11th-century weir. The river is crossed by the Old Dee Bridge, dating from the 13th century, the Grosvenor Bridge of 1832, and Queen's Park suspension bridge (for pedestrians). To the southwest of the city, the River Dee curves towards the north. The area between the river and the city walls here is known as the Roodee and contains Chester Racecourse, which holds a series of horse races and other events. The first recorded race meet in England at Roodee Fields was on 9 February 1540. The Shropshire Union Canal runs to the north of the city and a branch leads from it to the River Dee.

The Deva Roman Experience has hands-on exhibits and a reconstructed Roman street. One of the blocks in the forecourt of the Castle houses the Cheshire Military Museum.

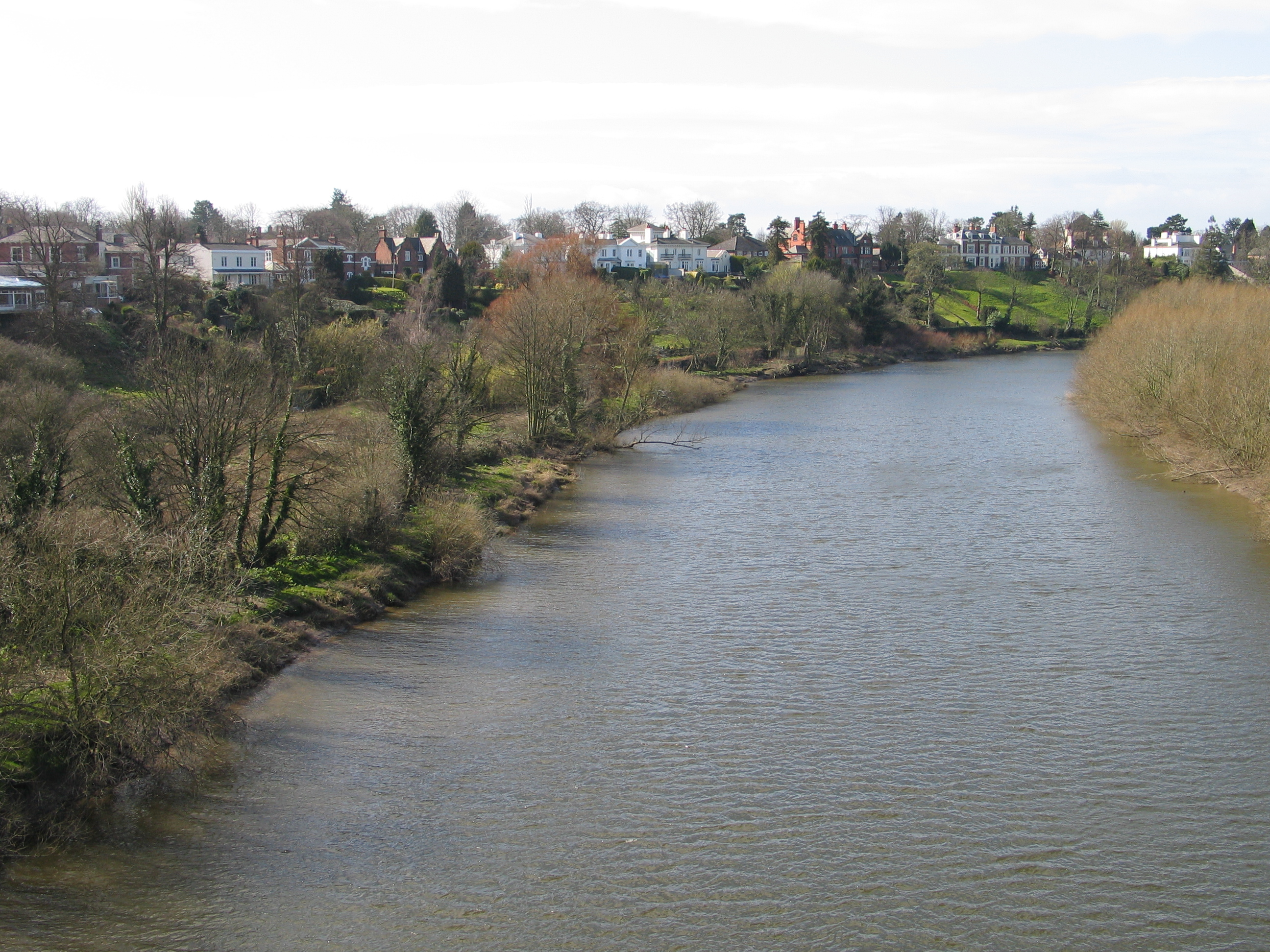
Curzon Park as seen from Grosvenor Bridge across the River Dee

The major public park in Chester is Grosvenor Park. On the south side of the River Dee, in Handbridge, is Edgar's Field, another public park, which contains Minerva's Shrine, a Roman shrine to the goddess Minerva. A war memorial to those who died in the world wars is in the town hall and it contains the names of all Chester servicemen who died in the First World War.

There are cruises on the River Dee and the Shropshire Union Canal, as well as guided open-air bus tours. The river cruises and bus tours start from a riverside area known as the Groves, which contains seating and a bandstand. A series of festivals is organised in the city, including mystery plays, a summer music festival and a literature festival. There is a Tourist Information Centre at the town hall.

The Cheshire Police Constabulary was historically based in the city from its foundation in 1857. Originally on Seller Street, its headquarters moved to Egerton Street (both since redeveloped), and then from 1870 to 113 Foregate Street, where Parker's Buildings now stand. In 1883, the police headquarters moved to 142 Foregate Street, Chester, now preserved as a Grade II listed building. The county police headquarters has since moved again, in 1967, to Nuns Road before leaving the city in 2003 for Clemonds Hey, Winsford.

== Demography ==
According to the 2011 census, Chester had a large White British proportion of around 110,000 or 90.9% of the population. 1.0% described themselves as Irish. 3.6% as Other White. 2.2% described themselves as Asian. 1.3% described themselves as Mixed Race. 0.6% described themselves as Black or Black British and 0.3% are classed as other. Cheshire West and Chester also has a large number of Christians at 76.4%. 14% have no religion, and 8.2% are not stated. 0.7% are Muslim. 0.1% are Sikhs. 0.1% are Jewish. 0.2% are Buddhists.

The population was forecast to grow by 5% from 2005 to 2021. The resident population for Chester District in the 2001 Census was 118,200. This represents 17.5% of the Cheshire County total (1.8% of the North West population).

== Education ==
The city is home to the University of Chester. Formerly a teacher training college, it gained full university status in 2005 and is the county's main provider of tertiary education.

Cheshire College – South & West is a vocational college with campuses in Handbridge as well as Ellesmere Port and Crewe.

The King's School, a private school, was established by King Henry VIII in 1541. The girls-only Queen's School, another independent school, was founded in 1878.

Other secondary schools include:

- Bishops' Blue Coat C of E
- Catholic High School
- Queens Park High School
- Upton-by-Chester High School
- Blacon High School
- Christleton High School

== Culture ==
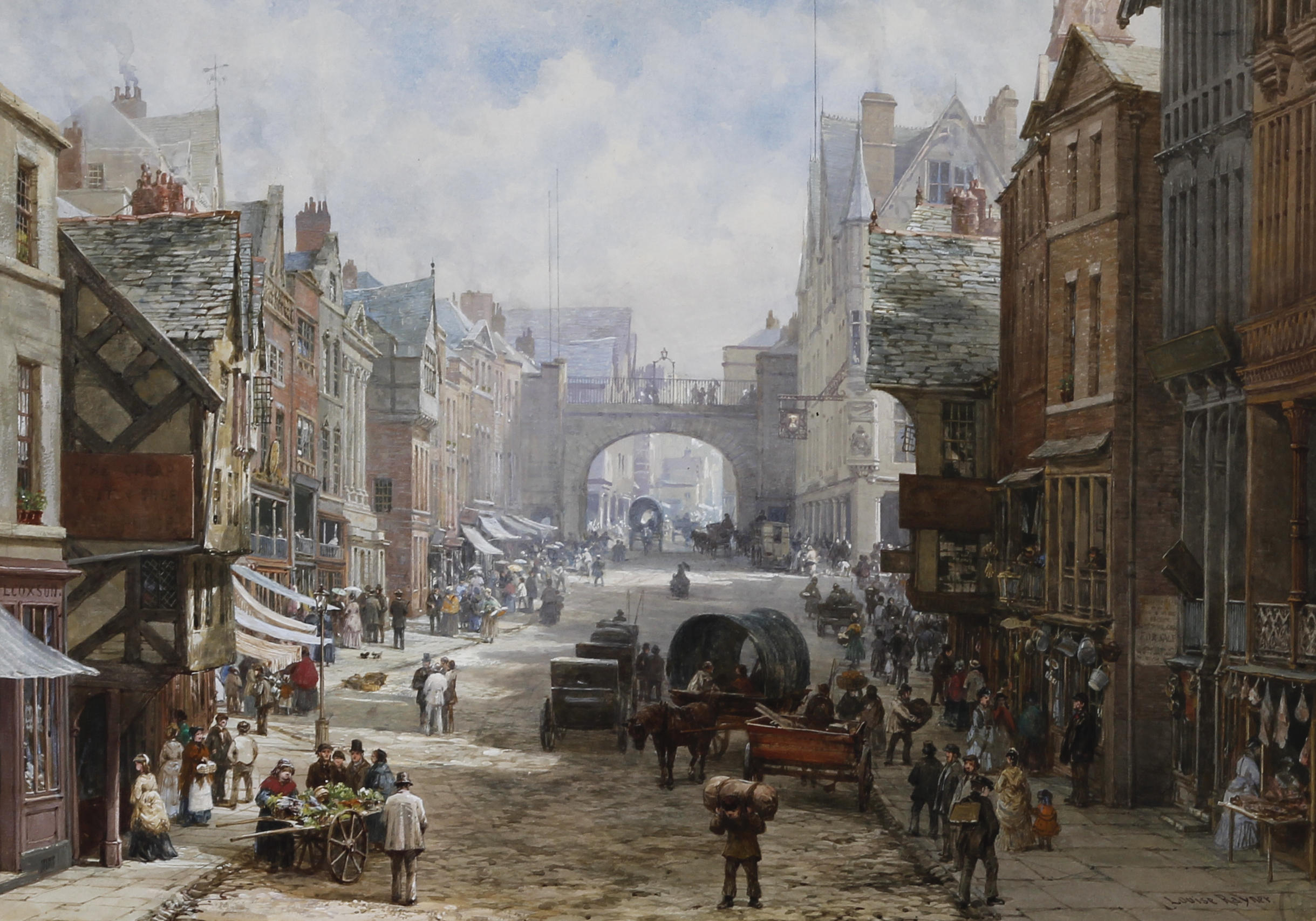
Eastgate Street painted by Louise Rayner, c. 1880

The major museum in Chester is the Grosvenor Museum, which includes a collection of Roman tombstones and an art gallery. Associated with the museum is a building on 20 Castle Street that has rooms furnished in different historical styles. The Dewa Roman Experience has hands-on exhibits and a reconstructed Roman street. One of the blocks in the forecourt of Chester Castle houses the Cheshire Military Museum.

The £37m Storyhouse arts centre opened in the city centre in 2017. It includes a theatre, cinema, restaurant and the city's main library. It is housed in the city's remodelled 1936 Odeon Cinema and replaces the Gateway Theatre and the former library on Northgate Street.

Chester Little Theatre is based in Newtown and run by Chester Theatre Club. It generally stages 5 or 6 plays each year. Chester Music Theatre is based in a converted church in Boughton. There was a multiplex cinema and a ten-pin bowling alley at Greyhound Retail Park on the city's edge, but these have closed. The cinema has moved to Broughton, just over the border in North Wales. A Picturehouse multi-screen cinema was built in the city centre as part of the Northgate Project. Chester has its own film society, several amateur dramatic societies and theatre schools.

The Grove area of Chester is home to a Grade II-listed bandstand built in 1913. A programme of afternoon performances runs every weekend and Bank Holiday from May to August each year, usually including brass bands, choirs, jazz, blues, and acoustic performers. The current Bandstand Coordinator is Luke Moore, who was appointed in 2018 and has expanded the programme to include a mixture of visual art, theatre, poetry, and community events alongside a variety of musical performances.

Grosvenor Park Open Air Theatre, founded in 2010, is the only site-specific professional open-air theatre company outside London. It has an eight-week annual summer repertory season.

To the east side of the city is Chester Zoo, the UK's largest zoo with over 11,000 animals in 110 acres of award-winning gardens.

Numerous pubs, nightclubs, and bars, some of which are located in medieval buildings, populate the city. One such example is Quaintways.

=== Music ===
Chester has had a professional classical music festival – the Chester Summer Music Festival, beginning in 1967 and regularly since 1978. The festival went into liquidation in 2012. A major new music festival was launched in March 2013 (previously known as Chester Performs), running annually every summer. The Chester Music Festival features the professional music group Ensemble Deva led by Giovanni Guzzo and Music Director Clark Rundell. Ensemble Deva regularly features soloists and section leaders from the country's leading symphony orchestras, including Liverpool Philharmonic, the Hallé and Manchester Camerata.

The composer Howard Skempton was born in Chester in 1947.

Chester has a brass band that was formed in 1853. It was known as the Blue Coat Band and today as The City of Chester Band. It is a third section brass band with a training band. Its members wear a blue-jacketed uniform with an image of the Eastgate clock on the breast pocket of the blazer.

Chester Music Society was founded in 1948 as a small choral society. It now encompasses four sections: The Choir has 170 members drawn from Chester and the surrounding district; The Youth Choirs support three choirs: Youth Choir, Preludes, and the Alumni Choir; Celebrity Concerts promote a season of six high-quality concerts each year; The club is a long established section which aims to encourage young musicians and in many cases offers the first opportunity to perform in public.

The Chester Philharmonic Orchestra (CPO) was founded in 1884 and is one of the premier non-professional orchestras in North West England. Formerly the Chester Orchestral Society, it performs music from a vast repertoire. The Orchestra is a registered charity and usually performs four or five concerts each year (including an annual carol concert) in the magnificent setting of Chester's ancient Cathedral under the direction of well-known professional conductors.

Telford's Warehouse, Alexander's Jazz Bar and The Live Rooms are the city's leading live music venues.

An annual popular music festival started in 2011 called Chester Rocks. It is held on the grounds of the Chester Racecourse.

The founder members of the band River City People (guitarist Tim Speed and his drummer brother Paul Speed) are from Chester. They had a number of hits in the early 1990s. Later into the same decade, Mansun formed in the city after singer Paul Draper met guitarist Dominic Chad whilst working in the local former Fat Cat Bar. More recently, Shy and the Fight, featuring Chester-based musicians, has achieved national attention via airplay on Radio 1 and Radio 2, also appearing at Wychwood and Swn festivals. Other bands that have gone on to achieve a degree of success outside of the city include The Suns, The Wayriders, Motion Empire, Casino and Face Of Christ and The Lovelies.

=== Media ===
Chester's newspapers include the weekly paid-for Chester Chronicle and freesheet Chester Standard. The Chester Evening Leader and Midweek Chronicle are no longer in publication.

Chester's Dee Radio is the city's radio station, with Heart North West, Capital North West and Wales and BBC Radio Merseyside also broadcasting locally. Lache FM is currently Chester's only Community radio station.

Television in Chester is served by BBC North West Tonight and ITV Granada Reports , and with its close proximity to North Wales, viewers can also receive BBC Wales Today and ITV News Wales at Six . Chester is where Channel 4's soap opera Hollyoaks is set (although most filming takes place around Liverpool).

=== In literature ===
Lydia Sigourney gives her impressions of the city in her poem Chester published in Pleasant Memories of Pleasant Lands, 1842. These relate to her visit to this country from America in 1840.

== Economy ==
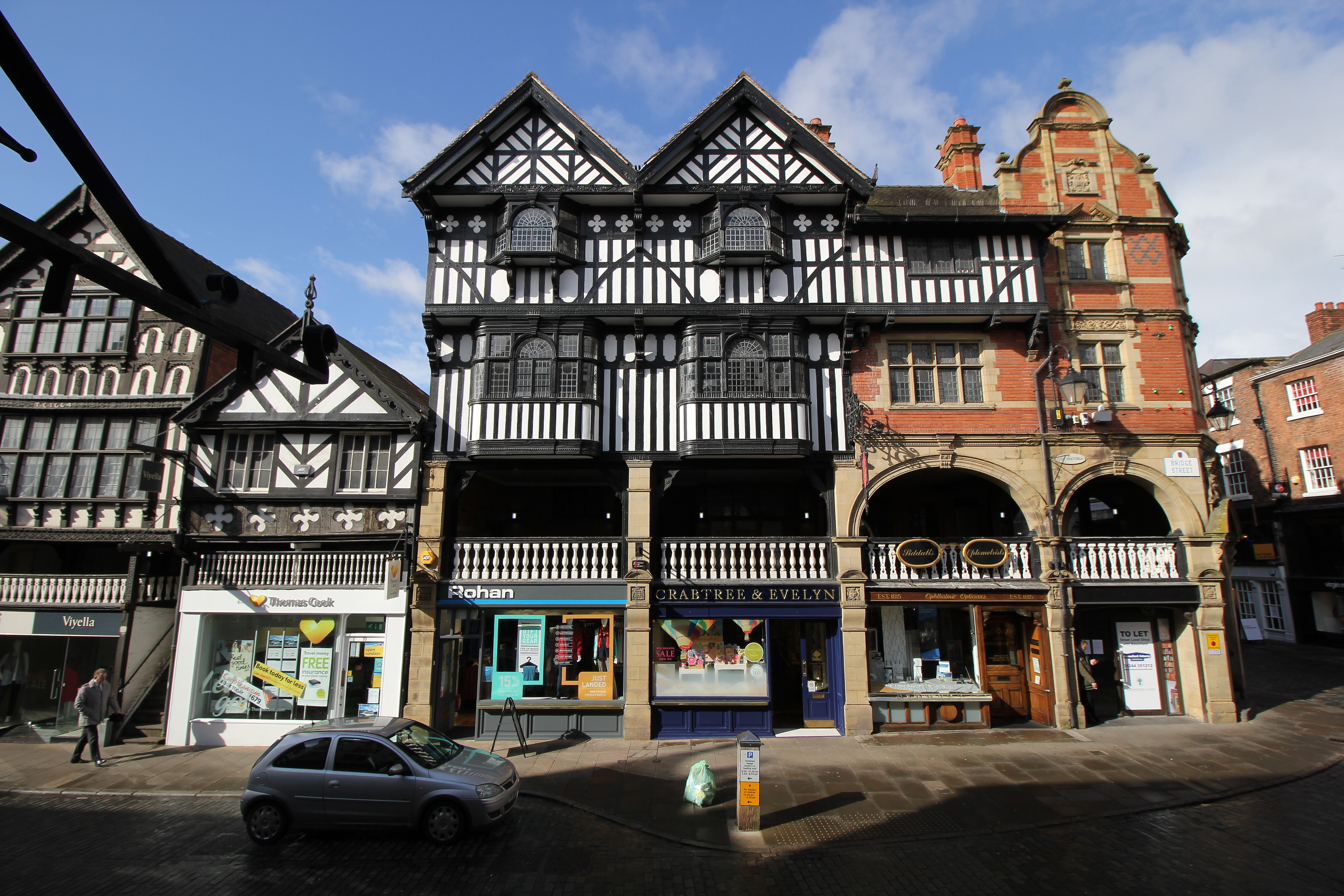
Bridge Street and the Rows at Chester, designed by T.M. Lockwood

Chester's primary industries are now the service industries, which are tourism, retail, public administration, and financial services. Many domestic and international tourists visit to view the city's landmarks and heritage, with a complementary benefit to hotels and restaurants.

The city's central shopping area includes its unique Rows or galleries (two levels of shops), which date from medieval times and are believed to include the oldest shop front in England. The city has many chain stores. Also, it features an indoor market and two main indoor shopping centres: The Grosvenor Shopping Centre and the Forum (a reference to the city's Roman past). There are retail parks to the west and south. Cheshire Oaks Designer Outlet and Broughton Retail Park are near the city.

Chester has a relatively large financial sector including Bank of America, NFU Mutual, Lloyds Bank, Virgin Money, Quilter, and M&S Bank. The price comparison website moneysupermarket.com is based over the Welsh border in Ewloe. Chester has its own university, the University of Chester, and a major hospital, the Countess of Chester Hospital, named after Diana, Princess of Wales and Countess of Chester.

The restaurant chain Hickory's Smokehouse started in Chester, with its first location on The Groves opening in 2010.

Just over the Welsh border to the west, Broughton is home to a large Airbus UK factory (formerly British Aerospace), employing around 6,000 staff, where the wings of the Airbus aeroplanes are manufactured. There are food processing plants to the north and west. The Iceland frozen food company is based in nearby Deeside.

=== Developments ===
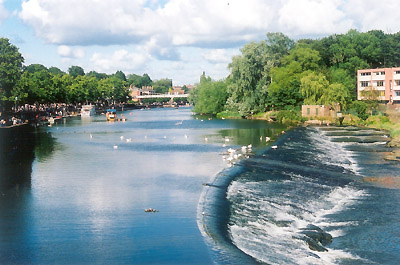
Chester Weir on the River Dee

In 2007, Chester City Council announced a 10-year plan to see Chester become a "must-see European destination". At a cost of £1.3 billion it was branded Chester Renaissance.

The Northgate Development project began in 2007 with the demolition of St. Martin's House on the city's ring road. At a cost of £460 million, Chester City Council and developers ING hoped to create a new quarter for Chester. The development was intended see the demolition of the market hall, bus station, theatre and NCP car park. They were to be replaced with a multi-storey car park, bus exchange, performing arts centre, library, homes, retail space and a department store which will be anchored by House of Fraser. There project was put on hold in 2008 due to the economic downturn. However a number of Chester's other Renaissance projects continued, including a new health centre, offices and apartments in the Delamere Street development, and a hotel and new headquarters for Cheshire West and Chester Council in the £60million HQ development. Work on a new bus station started in October 2015 and it opened in June 2017. The Northgate Project is now being led by the council and is due to include a new market hall, cinema, multi-storey car park and restaurant units on the site of the former bus exchange. Building work has begun and is due to be completed in 2022.

== Transport ==
=== Roads ===
The city is a hub for major roads, including the M53 motorway towards the Wirral Peninsula and Liverpool and the M56 motorway towards Manchester. The A55 road runs along the North Wales coast to Holyhead and the A483 links the city to nearby Wrexham and Swansea in Wales.

=== Buses ===
Bus transport in the city is provided by Stagecoach Merseyside & South Lancashire and Arriva Buses Wales; the council-owned and operated ChesterBus (formerly Chester City Transport) was sold to First Chester & The Wirral in mid-2007. Services connect the city with Liverpool, Rhyl, Flint, Holywell, Ellesmere Port, Northwich and Whitchurch. A National Express route between London and Liverpool stops in Chester.

A new bus exchange was built in the city at Gorse Stacks and opened to its first services on 30 May 2017.

Chester has four dedicated park and ride sites, three of them (Upton, Boughton Heath and Wrexham Road) along major roads surrounding the city.

=== Railways ===
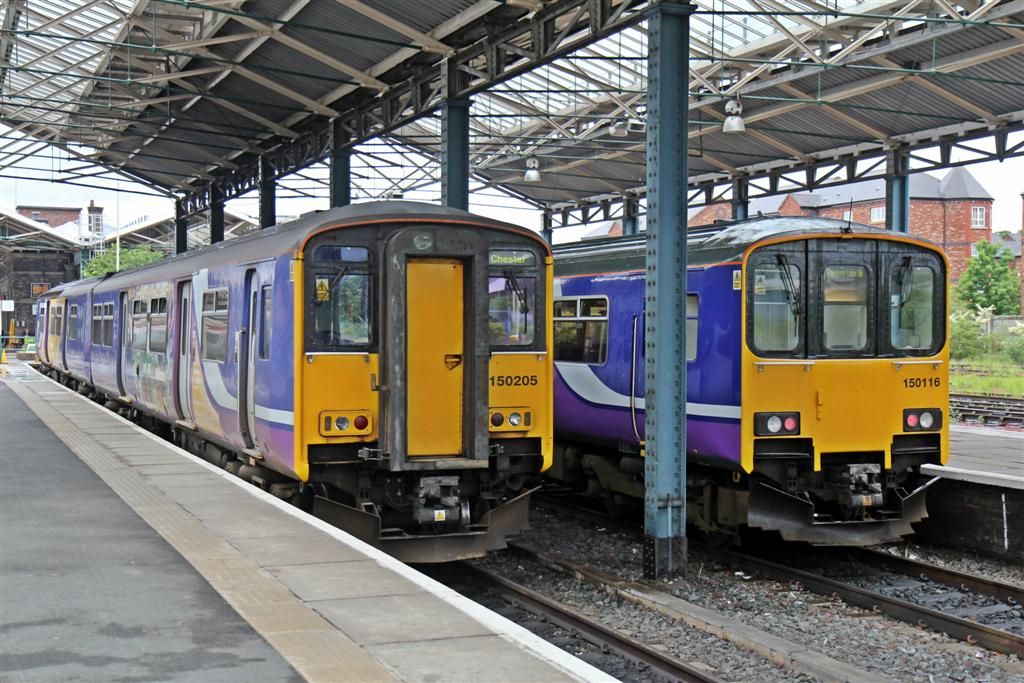
Two Northern Rail trains at Chester station

Chester railway station is served by four train operating companies:

- Avanti West Coast provides inter-city services between London Euston, Crewe and Holyhead
- Merseyrail operates electric services on the Wirral Line, on a circular route via Liverpool Central
- Northern Trains provides a regular service to Manchester Piccadilly, via Northwich and Stockport, on the Mid-Cheshire line
- Transport for Wales operates services on four routes:
  - Birmingham International to Holyhead, via Wrexham General
  - Manchester Piccadilly to Llandudno, via the North Wales Main Line; some services continue to Holyhead
  - Liverpool Lime Street, via Runcorn
  - Crewe, via Beeston Castle.

==== History ====
The city formerly had two railway stations: Chester General remains in use (now named simply Chester), but Chester Northgate closed in 1969 as a result of the Beeching cuts. (Note: Richard Beeching's report The Reshaping of British Railways was published in 1965.) Chester Northgate, which was north-east of the city centre, opened in 1875 as a terminus for the Cheshire Lines Committee. Trains travelled via Northwich to Manchester Central; later, services also went to Seacombe (Wallasey) and Wrexham Central via Shotton. It was demolished in the 1970s and the site is now part of the Northgate Arena leisure centre.

Chester General opened in 1848 and was designed with an Italianate frontage. It now has seven designated platforms but once had fourteen. The station lost its original roof in the 1972 Chester General rail crash. In September 2007, extensive renovations took place to improve pedestrian access and parking. Chester General also had a sizeable marshalling yard and a motive power depot, most of which has now been replaced with housing.

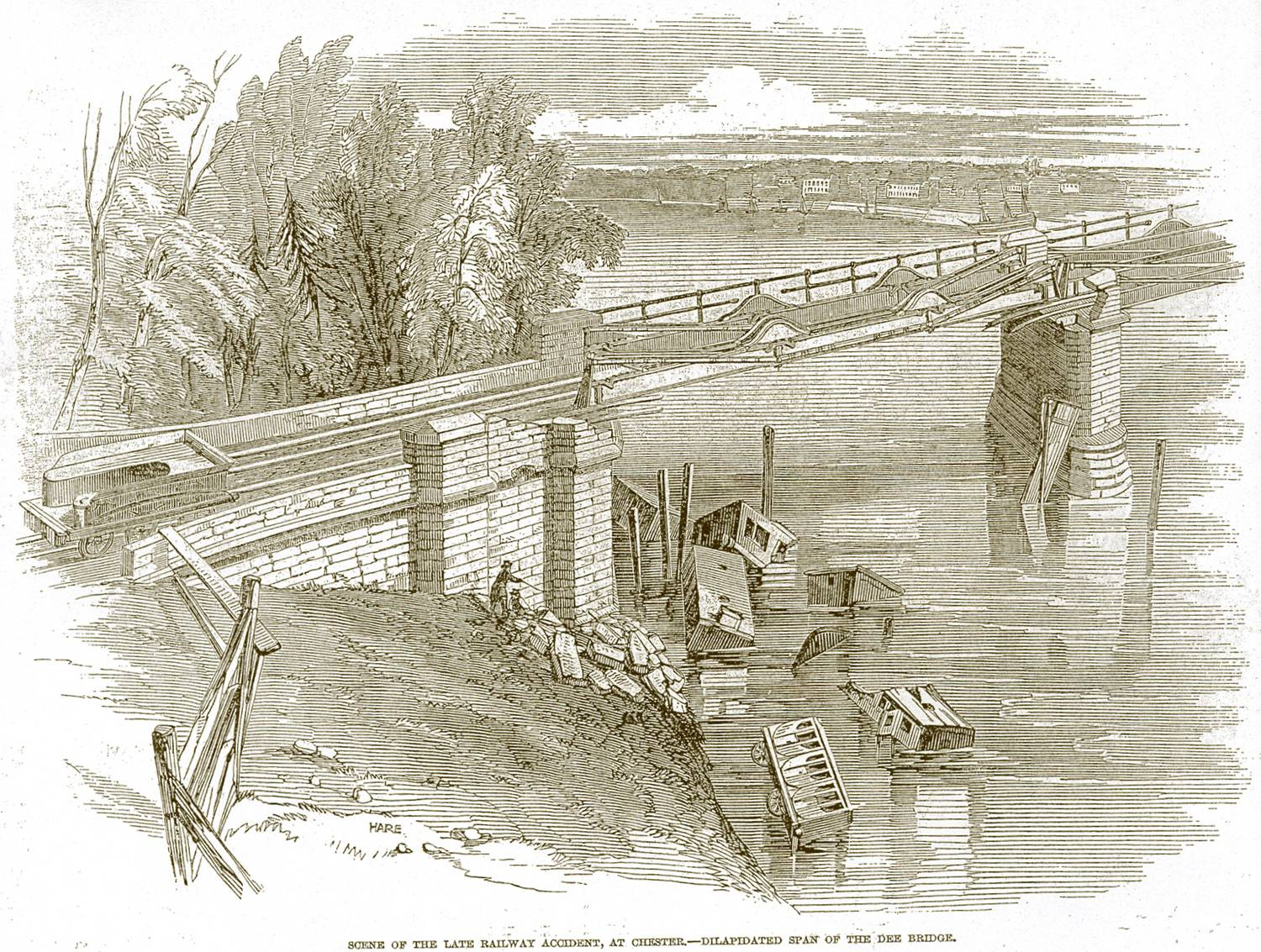
Dee bridge disaster, May 1847

In late 1847, the Dee bridge disaster occurred when a bridge span collapsed as a train passed over the River Dee by the Roodee. Five people were killed in the accident. The bridge had been designed and built by famed railway engineer Robert Stephenson for the Chester and Holyhead Railway. A Royal Commission inquiry found that the trusses were made of cast iron beams that had inadequate strength for their purpose. A national scandal ensued and many new bridges of similar design were either taken down or heavily altered.

=== Cycling ===
There are a series of colour-coded signposted cycling routes around the city.

On 19 June 2008, then Secretary of State for Transport Ruth Kelly named Chester as a cycling demonstration town. This initiative allowed for substantial financial support to improve cycling facilities and a number of schemes were planned.

Potential schemes included a new pedestrian and cycling bridge across the River Dee, linking the Meadows with Huntington and Great Boughton; an access route between Curzon Park and the Roodee; an extension to the existing greenway route from Hoole to Guilden Sutton and Mickle Trafford; and an access route between the Millennium cycle route and Deva Link. However, following a reorganisation of the local authorities effective 1 April 2009, the Conservative-led administration of the newly established Cheshire West and Chester council was not supportive, so comparatively little was actually achieved.

Many of the ideas generated at the time were captured in a Cycle Chester Masterplan document.

=== Canals ===
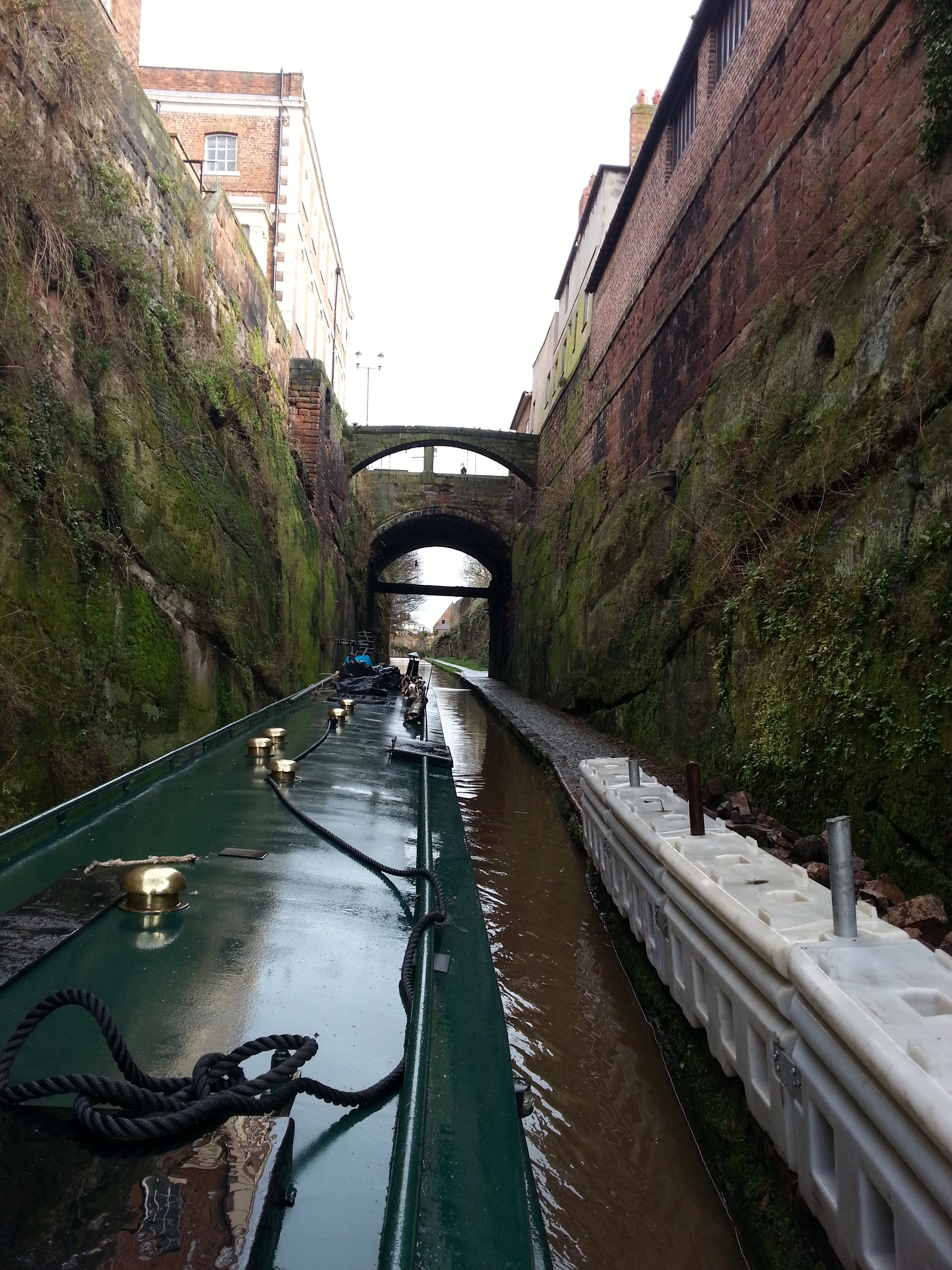
Canal cutting by Chester city walls

The Chester Canal was constructed with locks leading down to the River Dee. Canal boats could enter the river at high tide to load goods directly onto seagoing vessels. The port facilities at Crane Wharf, by Chester racecourse, made an important contribution to the commercial development of the North West region.

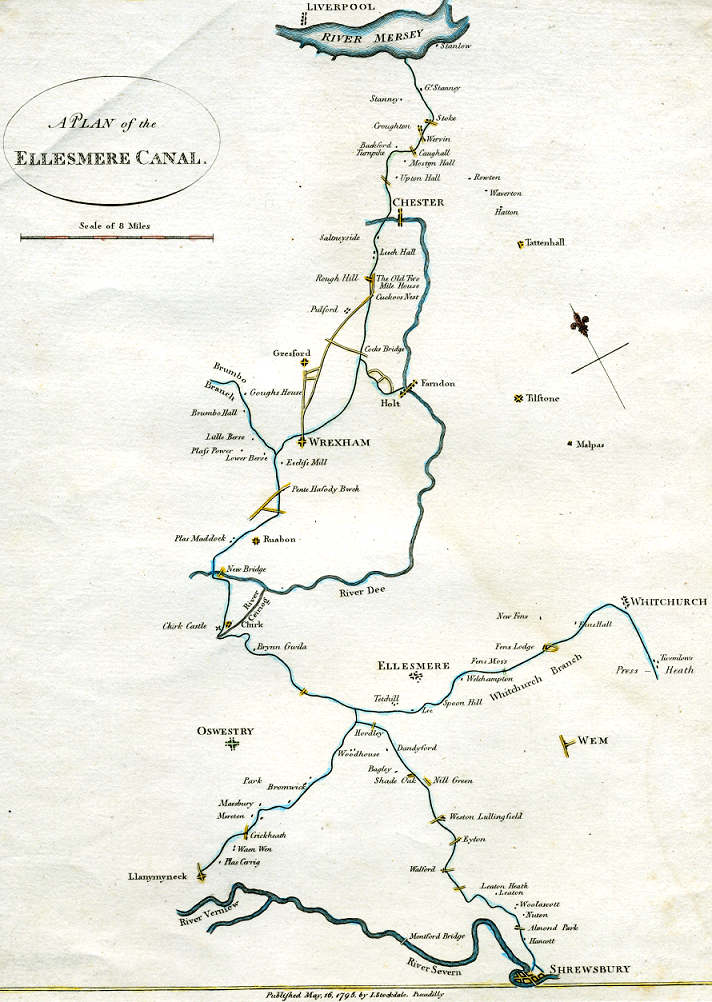
Map showing the proposed extensions of the Ellesmere Canal to Chester and Shrewsbury

The original Chester Canal was constructed to run from the River Dee near Sealand Road to Nantwich in south Cheshire and opened in 1774. In 1805, the Wirral section of the Ellesmere Canal was opened, which ran from Netherpool (now known as Ellesmere Port) to meet the Chester Canal at Chester canal basin. Later, those two canal branches became part of the Shropshire Union Canal network. This canal, which runs beneath the northern section of the city walls of Chester, is navigable and remains in use today.

From about 1794 to the late 1950s, when the canal-side flour mills were closed, narrowboats carried cargo such as coal, slate, gypsum or lead ore as well as finished lead (for roofing, water pipes and sewerage) from the leadworks in Egerton Street (Newtown). The grain from Cheshire was stored in granaries on the banks of the canal at Newtown and Boughton, and salt for preserving food arrived from Northwich.

==== Proposed canal ====
The original plan to complete the Ellesmere Canal was to connect Chester directly to the Wrexham coalfields by building a broad-gauge waterway with a branch to the River Dee at Holt. If the waterway had been built, canal traffic would have crossed the Pontcysyllte Aqueduct heading north to Chester and the River Dee.

As the route was never completed, the short length of the canal north of Trevor, near Wrexham, was infilled. The Llangollen Canal, although designed to be primarily a water source from the River Dee, became a cruising waterway despite its inherent narrow nature.

However, although Wrexham itself was bypassed, the plan to join the rivers Severn, Mersey, and Dee was completed, first by cutting the Wirral Arm from Chester to Ellesmere Port (Whitby wharf) and then by extending the Llangollen Arm via Ellesmere, Whitchurch and Bettisfield Moss through to the Chester Canal at Hurleston. The network became the Shropshire Union Canal.

=== Trams ===
Chester had a tram service during the late 19th and early 20th centuries. It ran from Saltney, on the Welsh border in the west, to Chester General station and then to Tarvin Road and Great Boughton. It featured the narrowest gauge trams (3' 6") in mainland Britain, due to an act of Parliament that deemed they must have the least obstructive route possible.

The tramway was established in 1871 by Chester Tramways Company. It was horse-drawn until it was taken over by the council in 1903. Renamed as Chester Corporation Tramways, it was reconstructed to the 3'6" gauge and electrified with overhead cables. The tramway was closed in February 1930, a fate experienced by most other systems in the UK. All that remains are small areas of uncovered track inside the former bus depot, and a few tram-wire supports attached to buildings on Eastgate/Foregate Street. However, substantial sections of the track remain buried beneath the current road surface.

Chester electric tram number 4, built by G.F. Milnes & Co. in 1903, has been preserved by Hooton Park Trust and is currently undergoing restoration.

=== Aviation ===
The nearest airport is Liverpool John Lennon Airport, about 24 miles (39 km) from Chester. Manchester Airport is approximately 29 mi (47 km) away. Hawarden Airport primarily serves private aviation, business travel and corporate charter flights; it is located about 4 miles (6.4 km) west of the city centre.

== Sport ==
=== Football ===
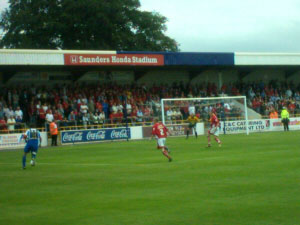
The defunct Chester City in action in 2007. The Deva Stadium, now used by Chester F.C., is on the border between England and Wales

Chester was home to Chester City F.C., who were founded in 1885 and elected to the Football League in 1931 and played at their Sealand Road stadium until 1990, spending two years playing in Macclesfield before returning to the city to the new Deva Stadium – which straddles the border of England and Wales – in 1992. The club first lost its Football League status in 2000, only to reclaim it four years later as Conference champions. However, they were relegated again in 2009 and went out of business in March 2010 after 125 years in existence.

Notable former players of the club include Ian Rush (who later managed the club), Cyrille Regis, Arthur Albiston, Earl Barrett, Lee Dixon, Steve Harkness, Roberto Martínez and Stan Pearson.

Following their demise, a new team – Chester F.C. – was founded. They play at the Deva Stadium and were elected to the Northern Premier League Division One North for the 2010–11 season, ending their first season as that division's champions, securing a place in the Northern Premier League Premier Division for the 2011–12 season. The club achieved promotion for the next two consecutive seasons. As of the 2026–27 season, Chester compete in the National League North.

=== Basketball ===
The city is represented at professional level by Cheshire Phoenix, based at Ellesmere Port and playing home games at Ellesmere Port Sports Village (Cheshire Oaks Arena). The club competes in the UK's top men's competition, the Super League Basketball. Wheelchair basketball is played by the Cheshire Phoenix Wheelchair Basketball Club, formed in 2014 as a merger between Cheshire Phoenix and Celtic Warriors Wheelchair Basketball Club.

=== Rugby Union ===
Chester Rugby Club (union) plays in National League 2 West. It won the EDF Energy Intermediate Cup in the 2007–08 season and the Cheshire Cup several times.

=== Watersports on the River Dee ===
The River Dee is home to Grosvenor Rowing Club, Royal Chester Rowing Club and the University of Chester Rowing Club, and two school clubs, The King's School Chester Rowing Club and Queen's Park High Rowing Club. According to the rowing historian Tim Koch, the city's annual rowing regatta dates back to at least 1814, making it older than The Boat Race (1829) and Henley Royal Regatta (1839), although the regatta claims to date back even further to 1733. Other annual rowing events include the Chester Long Distance Sculls and the Dee Autumn Head in autumn, and the North of England Head in March. The weir is used by a number of local canoe and kayak clubs. Each July, the Chester Raft Race is held on the River Dee in aid of charity.

=== Horseracing ===
Chester Racecourse hosts several flat race meetings from the spring to the autumn. The races take place within view of the City walls and attract tens of thousands of visitors. The May meeting includes several nationally significant races, such as the Chester Vase, which is recognised as a trial for The Derby.

=== Other sports ===
A successful hockey club, Chester H.C., plays at the County Officers' Club on Plas Newton Lane. Deva Handball Club is based in Chester and competes in national competition. There is also an American football team, the Chester Romans, who compete in the BAFA National Leagues.

Chester Golf Club is near the banks of the Dee, and there are numerous private golf courses near the city, as well as a 9-hole municipal course at Westminster Park.

The Northgate Arena is the city's main leisure centre; smaller sports centres are in Christleton and Upton. The Victorian City Baths are in the city centre.

December 2011 saw the first Chester Santa Dash, a festive running event in aid of local charities.

The city has hosted the RAC Rally eight times.

== Twin towns ==
Chester is twinned with:

- Sens, France
- Lörrach, Loerrach International Germany
- Senigallia, Italy

== Notable people ==
See Category:People from Chester

- Ian Blair (1953–2025), Commissioner for the Metropolitan Police
- Sir Adrian Boult (1889–1983), musical conductor, born in Liverpool Road
- Randolph Caldecott (1846–86), artist and book illustrator, was born in Bridge Street, Chester
- Group Captain Leonard Cheshire (1917–1992), Second World War RAF bomber pilot and founder of the Leonard Cheshire Disability charity, was born at 65 Hoole Road, Hoole, Chester (although he was brought up in Oxford); the house where he was born (now a guest house) bears a blue plaque attesting to this
- Eileen de Coppet, Princess of Albania (1922–1985), the wife to the pretender of the throne of the Principality of Albania, was born in Chester.
- John Douglas (1830–1911), architect, lived in and had his practice in Chester, and designed many of its Victorian buildings
- David Evans (born 1961), General Secretary of the Labour Party
- Leo Gradwell (1899–1969), barrister and Arctic Convoys war hero
- A. S. Hornby (1898–1978), notable grammarian and lexicographer
- Conor Kostick (born 1964), writer and historian
- Rory Lewis (born 1982), portrait photographer
- Frank Eric Lloyd (1909–1992), author of Rhodesian Patrol, born in Chester
- George Lloyd (1560–1615), Bishop of Chester, builder of Bishop Lloyd's House on Watergate Street, part of Chester Rows
- William Monk (1863–1937), etcher, woodcut engraver and painter
- Peter Newbrook (1920–2009), cinematographer, director, producer and writer
- Simon Nixon (born 1967), billionaire businessman, co-founder of Moneysupermarket.com
- Michael Fitzgerald Page (1922–2014), celebrated author and British Merchant Navy Officer
- Henry Raikes (1782-1854), Chancellor of Chester Cathedral
- David Roberts (1859–1928), an engineer who invented the caterpillar track, grew up in Great Boughton
- L. T. C. Rolt (1910–74), engineering historian, born in Chester
- Anthony Thwaite (1930–2021), poet and writer
- Beatrice Tinsley (née Hill) (1941–1981), astronomer and cosmologist, professor of astronomy at Yale University; was born in the city but was brought up in New Zealand
- Sir John Vanbrugh (1664–1726), architect and dramatist, raised in Chester
- David Yale (c. 1540–1626), Chancellor of Chester, member of the Yale family of Yale University in the United States

Actors

- Randle Ayrton (1869–1940)
- Emily Booth (born 1976), actress and writer
- Adrian Bower (born 1970)
- Ray Coulthard (born 1968)
- Daniel Craig (born 1968 in Liverpool Road)
- Emma Cunniffe (born 1973)
- Malcolm Hebden (born 1939 in Chester)
- Tom Hughes (born 1985)
- Hugh Lloyd (1923–2008)
- Ronald Pickup (1940–2021)
- Basil Radford (1897–1952)
- Graham Roberts (1929–2004)
- John Steiner (1941–2022)

Comedians

- Russ Abbot (born 1947) (birth name Russell Allan Roberts), musician, comedian and actor
- Jeff Green (born 1964), comedian
- Bob Mills (born 1957), comedian and gameshow host
- Stevie Riks (born 1967), comedian, impressionist and musician

Sport

- Paul Butler (born 1988), IBF Bantamweight World champion boxer
- Danny Collins (born 1980), Sunderland A.F.C. footballer
- Steven Cousins (born 1972), skater
- Andy Dorman (born 1982), Crystal Palace F.C. footballer
- Doug Ellis (1924–2018), former owner of Aston Villa F.C., born in Hooton and educated in Chester
- Ben Foden (born 1985), rugby player England and Northampton Saints
- Tom Heaton (born 1986), Burnley F.C. goalkeeper
- Danny Murphy (born 1977), footballer and former England international
- Michael Owen (born 1979), former English football international and Liverpool F.C. player
- Antonio Pedroza (born 1991), former Crystal Palace footballer
- Alex Sanderson (born 1979), international rugby union player and younger brother of Pat
- Pat Sanderson (born 1977), international rugby union player
- Ryan Shawcross (born 1987), Stoke City F.C. footballer
- Stuart Tomlinson (born 1985), former professional footballer, now professional wrestler at WWE
- Stuart Turner (born 1943), former Essex cricketer
- Beth Tweddle (born 1985 in Johannesburg, South Africa), World champion gymnast, attended The Queen's School, Chester
- Martin Tyler (born 1945), English football commentator
- Ricky Walden (born 1982), professional snooker player
- Helen Willetts (born 1972), former badminton international and weather forecaster

Music

- Kutski (born 1982), DJ and BBC Radio 1 presenter
- Lee Latchford-Evans (born 1975), singer of 1990s pop group Steps
- Nemone Metaxas (born 1973), DJ and radio presenter
- Stephen Oliver (1950–92), composer
- Andie Rathbone (born 1969), drummer of Chester-based indie band Mansun
- Howard Skempton (born 1947), composer
- Steve Wright, singer of Juveniles, Fiat Lux, Camera Obscura and Hoi Poloi
- Emily Roberts, lead guitarist in The Last Dinner Party

== Freedom of the City ==
The following people and military units have received the Freedom of the City of Chester:

=== Individuals ===
- Sir Thomas Grosvenor: 1677.
- Major General Gerald Grosvenor, 6th Duke of Westminster: 1973.

=== Military units ===
- The Cheshire Regiment: 1948.
- The Cheshire Yeomanry: 1996.
- HMS Albion, RN: 2003.
- 1st Battalion The Mercian Regiment: 26 March 2008.
- 1st Battalion The Royal Welsh

== See also ==
- Grade I listed buildings in Chester
- All Saints Church, Hoole
- Bishop Lloyd's House
- St Barnabas' Church, Chester
- St Mary's Church, Handbridge
- St Paul's Church, Boughton
- Chester (placename element) for other place names containing 'Chester', 'Cester', 'Caster' etc.
