= Frank Eric Lloyd =

- Born: 20 August 1909; Chester, UK
- Died: 21 October 1992 (aged 83); Chester, UK
- Other names: Lofty Lloyd
- Organization: British South Africa Police
- Known for: Author of Rhodesian Patrol
- Title: Sergeant (BSAP)
- Spouse: Jane Wray McCrudden
- Children: 4

Sergeant Frank Eric Lloyd (20 August 1909 – 21 October 1992) was a member of the British South Africa Police in Southern Rhodesia from 1932 to 1955. He is best known as author of Rhodesian Patrol, an autobiographical account of his time in the BSAP.

== Early life ==
Frank Eric Lloyd was born in Chester, Cheshire, England, the second son of Joseph and Elizabeth Lloyd, who owned Lloyd's Cooperage in Watergate Row, Chester.

== Career in British South Africa Police ==
After travelling to Cape Town, South Africa in 1931 to join the British South Africa Police, he was accepted as a recruit and spent five months training in Salisbury (now Harare), Southern Rhodesia. He spent the early part of his police career on mounted patrol in the Matopo Hills (now Matobo National Park). During the early part of World War II while stationed at Bulawayo he absconded in an attempt to fight in the East African Campaign. He crossed into Northern Rhodesia (now Zambia) at Victoria Falls and at Broken Hill (now Kabwe) stowed away in the army convoy of the 4th Rhodesian Anti Tank Battery who were en route to Kenya. After several days travelling he was discovered and arrested at Mpika and tried back at Salisbury for desertion, receiving a sentence of six weeks with hard labour.

Subsequent to the war, he was stationed at Miami (now Mwami) in West Mashonaland and later at Sipolilo (now Guruve) in Central Mashonaland.

He retired from the BSAP in 1955. His autobiographical account of life in the BSAP, Rhodesian Patrol, was published in 1965.

== Career after retirement from BSAP ==
His later career was in the service of the Duke of Westminster during which time he lived at Eccleston Lodge on the Duke's Eaton estate.

== Private life ==
While stationed at Sinoia (now Chinhoyi) in 1941, he met Jane Wray McCrudden, a Nursing sister at Sinoia Hospital and originally from Belfast, Northern Ireland. They married and had four children: Patricia, Charles, Lorna and Eileen.

== Bibliography ==
- Lloyd, F.E. (1965), Rhodesian Patrol, Ilfraccombe, Devon: Arhur H.Stockwell Ltd
- Gibbs, Peter; Hughes, Phillip; Russell, Nick (2009), Blue and Old Gold: The History of the British South Africa Police 1899 – 1980, Johannesburg, South Africa: 30 Degrees South
