= 3–31 Northgate Street, Chester =

Buildings in Chester, England

Coordinates: 53.1910°N 2.8917°W

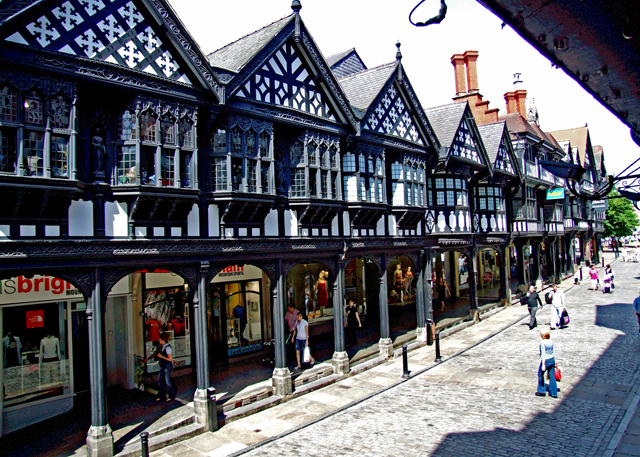
Northgate Street, Chester, showing numbers 5 to 31

3–31 Northgate Street is a terrace of shops, offices and a public house on the west side of Northgate Street, Chester, Cheshire, England. All the buildings have a set-back ground floor with a covered walkway, are timber-framed in their upper storeys, and are listed buildings, being graded II* or II. The part of the terrace comprising numbers 5–31 is known as Shoemakers' Row, or Sadler's Row.

== 3 Northgate Street ==
This consists of a shop on the ground floor over which is the dining room of Chester City Club. It was designed by H. W. Beswick and built between 1898 and 1899 for Charles Brown. Above the shop the building is externally expressed as two storeys, each of which is jettied. The lower of these storeys has a full-length mullioned and transomed window and the storey above has a three-light window. Above this is a gable with an ornate bargeboard and a finial. It is a Grade II listed building.

== 5–9 Northgate Street ==
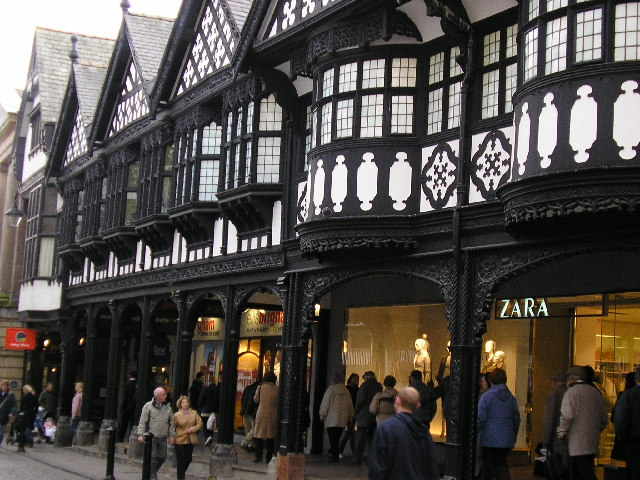
Northgate Street showing the bow windows of numbers 11–13 in the foreground and the oriel windows of numbers 5–9 beyond

The site was owned by the local architect John Douglas who designed the building which was constructed in 1900. Number 9 was rebuilt after a fire in 1914. The whole has two storeys and six bays. On the ground floor modern shop fronts are behind an arcade that is raised by two steps above the street. Above this is a carved bressumer which includes the date 1900. The upper storey includes three pairs of canted five-light oriel windows; between each pair of windows is a carved figure. Above all are three gables with carved bargeboards and finials. The building is listed Grade II*.

== 11–13 Northgate Street ==
Listed Grade II, this building consists of a shop built in 1900 for J. F. Denson and Sons and designed by John Douglas. On the ground floor there is a modern shop front behind an arcade. In the upper storey are decorated panels above which are two seven-light bowed oriel windows, each with further windows on each side, forming a row of continuous glazing. The gable is jettied and contains two rows of quatrefoil panels and a carved bargeboard. Internally the cellars consist of sandstone medieval undercrofts.

== 15–17 Northgate Street ==
Number 17 was originally the Cross Keys Inn. The two properties are now joined to form one shop which was built about 1909 and designed by James Strong. The ground floor has a modern shop front behind an arcade. The first storey has three bays and is close studded. Each side bay has a five-light oriel window, and in the central bay is a three-bay casement window. The third storey is jettied and close studded with three hipped half-dormers, each of three lights. The cellar probably consists of the paired undercroft of one medieval house. The building is listed Grade II.

== 19 Northgate Street ==
A Grade II listed building, this shop contains some medieval masonry and was rebuilt about 1900, the architect probably being John Douglas. The shop has three storeys and three bays. The middle storey contains a six-light oriel window, the central two lights of which project to form a bow window; on each side of the oriel is another single-light window. The top storey is jettied and contains two canted five-light oriel windows and braced panels. Above these are two gables containing quatrefoil panels.

== 21–23 Northgate Street ==
This is a shop and a café standing on the site of one or two medieval buildings. It was built in 1897 and designed by H. J. Beswick for Charles Brown. In the middle storey is a continuous mullioned and transomed window; this consists of a pair of three-light casement windows in the centre, and a four-light canted oriel window on each side. The top storey is jettied and contains a six-light casement window. Under the window are four pargetted panels that include the date "1897", and the initials "CB". At the side of the window are curved struts, and over it are ornate panels within the gable, which is topped by a carved finial. The building is listed Grade II*. In the cellar of number 23 are the remains of columns from the principia of the Roman fort that previously stood on the site.

== 25 Northgate Street ==
Formerly the Woolpack Inn, this is now a shop and restaurant. It was rebuilt, probably by John Douglas, in about 1903, and modified in about 1914 to a design of 1909 by James Strong. It consists of a cellar over which are three storeys. The middle storey is jettied and contains three three-light casement windows over decorated panels. The top storey contains a six-light casement window with decorated panels beneath and to the sides. Over this the gable is jettied and includes quatrefoil panels. The cellar is mainly a medieval undercroft which possibly contains Roman stonework. The building is listed Grade II*.

== 27–31 Northgate Street ==
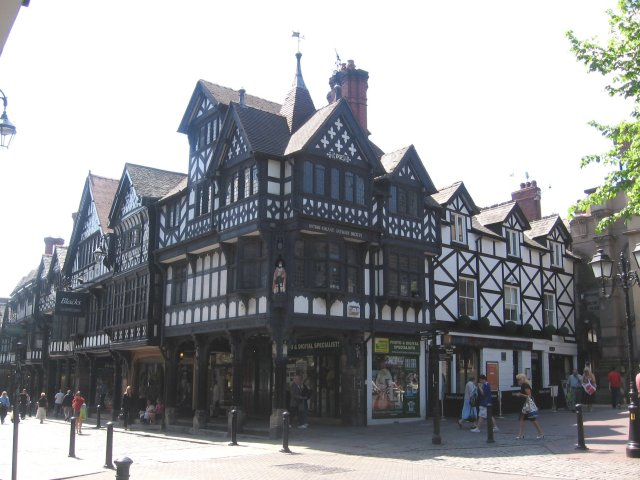
27–31 Northgate Street with the Dublin Packet public house on the right

This Grade II* listed building is more complex than the others, consisting of shops, offices and a public house, and with one face overlooking Northgate Street and the other overlooking Town Hall Square. The public house dates probably from the early 19th century, and the rest of the building was re-fronted by John Douglas in 1902. The building as a whole is constructed in three storeys with a small attic and cellars. The Northgate Street face has a three-bay arcade on the street level. In the niches above the capitals of the columns supporting the arcade are carvings of figures; those facing the street are in Elizabethan costume playing instruments, while the two figures at the corner of the two faces are carrying scrolls. The middle storey of the face is jettied. It has a two-light mullioned and transomed casement window in number 29, and a four-light oriel window in number 31. At the corner of the building is a half-size painted effigy of Edward VII. The top storey is complex. Number 27 has a two-light casement window; number 28 also has a two-light casement window, above which is a jettied, gabled attic containing a five-light casement window and surmounted by a carved finial; number 31 has a four-light casement window over which is a jettied gable with a shaped bargeboard and a finial. Behind the gable of number 31 is a flèche with a finial and a gilt weather vane.

The face overlooking Town Hall Square has two storeys and five bays. The two east (left) bays are a continuation of the building overlooking Northgate Street, while the three west bays constitute the Dublin Packet public house. The first bay has a three-light canted oriel window with side-lights in the middle storey, over which is a jetty-beam inscribed with the Chester City motto in Latin. The jettied top storey has a five-light casement window over which is a tie-beam inscribed 1902. Above this are quatrefoil panels, a gable with a shaped bargeboard, and a final. The second bay has a modern shop front at ground level, and a jettied middle storey containing a three-light casement window. The top floor has a gable simpler and smaller than that in the first bay which contains a three-light casement window. The ground floor of the public house is rendered and has a recessed porch; the upper stories are timber-framed. In the middle storey are three four-pane sash windows and in the top storey are three half-dormers, each containing a two-light casement window.

== See also ==
- Grade II* listed buildings in Cheshire West and Chester
- Grade II listed buildings in Chester (central)
- List of non-ecclesiastical and non-residential works by John Douglas
