= Chester Raft Race =

River event held in Chester, England

Coordinates: 53.1889°N 2.8805°W

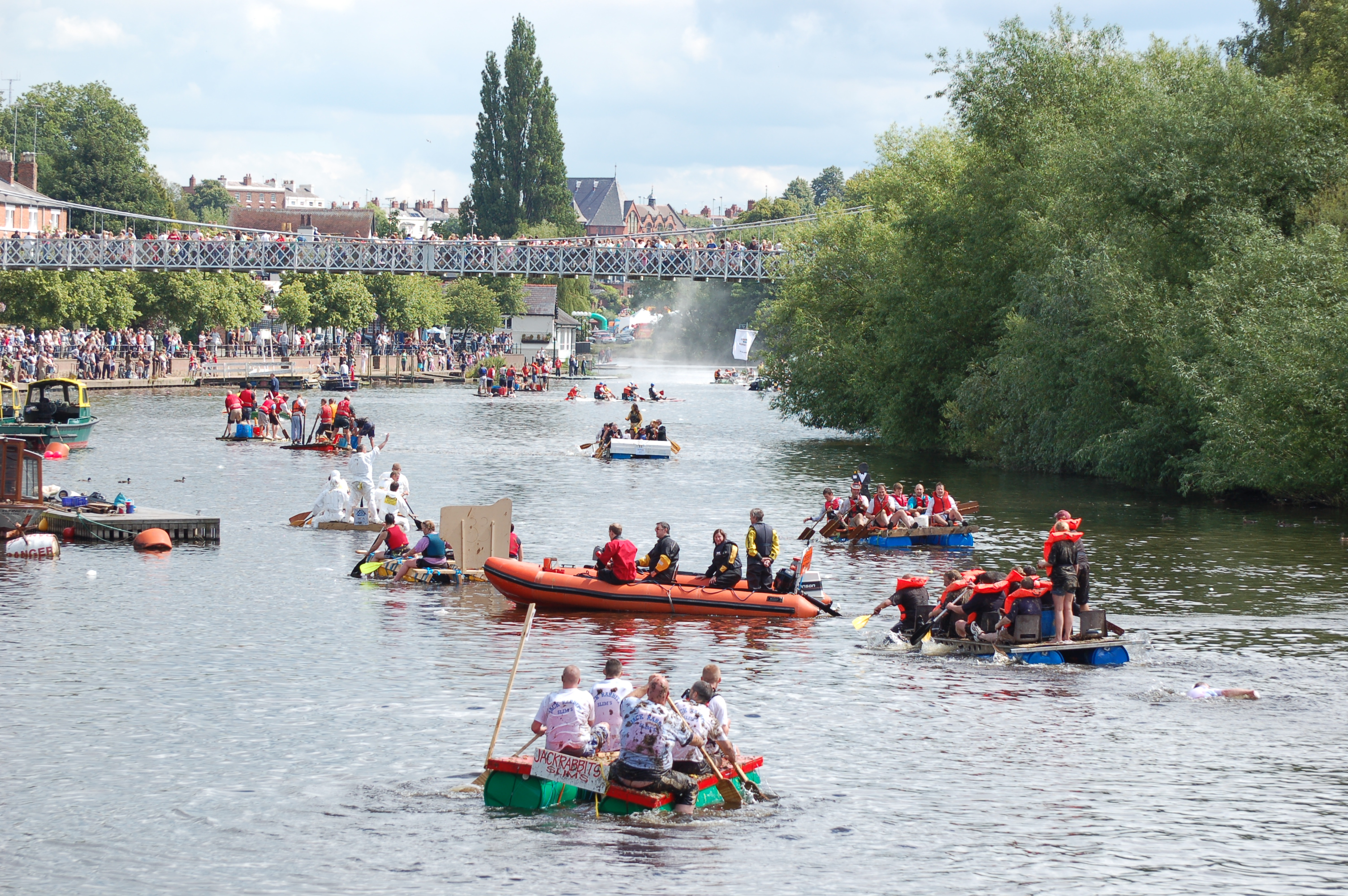
Chester Raft Race 2008

The Chester Raft Race is an annual charity event taking place every July on the River Dee in Chester, organised by Chester Round Table

The rafts race against the clock over a quarter mile (400 m) course, starting by the rowing club, and passing under pedestrian suspension bridge. Until 2013 it continued down the weir and finished on the south bank above the road bridge. Although the race is over at this point, the remnants of the rafts and crew then had to retrace their route back up the weir and return to the site assembly/parking area (The Meadows).

No races were held in 2020 or 2021 due to the COVID-19 Pandemic.

== 2014 event ==
The 2014 event was held on 6 July and featured a display of flyboarding by Jay St John. Forty rafts took part, and the winner with the fastest time of 9m 20s was Cheshire Waste and Skip Hire with In The Navy. Winner of the theme prize was Marshall Air Services with a complete floating jet-fighter tribute to Top Gun. The best pub entry was by Old Harkers Arms with a Yellow Submarine tribute to the Beatles. Best ladies raft was I Am Sailing, entered by The Druids Inn. The best school entry was Queens Lower School with The Queen of Hearts.

The main sponsor of the event was Survitec Group, a global specialist in marine safety equipment. In 2014 a new finish line was introduced at a point above the weir; this eliminated a risky descent of the weir. The Rotary Club of Chester donated proceeds from the race to Cheshire Young Carers and other local causes.

== Covid Postponements ==
The event was postponed in 2020 & 2021 due to the restriction imposed on large gatherings during the COVID-19 lockdowns. Plans were put in place for the 2022 Chester Raft Race at this time the organisation of the event would transfer to Chester Grosvenor 76 Round Table.

== Chester Raft Race 2022 Onwards ==
After 2 years of a Covid enforced hiatus the 2022 Event was announced for Sunday July 3, 2022 with the event receiving a new rebranded logo. The theme for the event was also confirmed as "100 Years of British Television" and the event Charity was announced with profits from the event going to the Countess of Chester Hospital - Blue Skies Balcony Appeal.

A brand new Event sponsor was announced as Salt Town Contractors

As of the 23rd of May 20 Rafts were signed up for the event with many returning entrants from previous years, as well as some new entries for Chester Raft Race 2022.

The 2022 Chester Raft Race, a beloved annual event held on the River Dee in Chester, England, marked its return after a two-year hiatus due to the COVID-19 pandemic. Organized by the Grosvenor Round Table, the race embraced a theme of "100 Years of British Television," inviting participants to adorn their rafts with creative tributes to iconic TV shows.

On the picturesque River Dee, spectators witnessed 23 rafts navigating the waters, each showcasing imaginative designs inspired by beloved British television programs. From Little Britain and Father Ted to Only Fools and Horses, the rafts paid homage to decades of TV entertainment, delighting onlookers with their ingenuity and humor.

Among the highlights of the event were the awards ceremony, where rafts were recognized for their creativity and speed. The coveted "Best Themed Raft" and "Fastest Hostelry" award went to Harker's Arms for their Magic Roundabout-themed raft, showcasing a perfect blend of nostalgia and speed.

Other notable winners included BOST Musicals, who claimed the title of "Fastest Ladies' Raft," and the team from the Crocky Trail, who secured the top spot for "Fastest Raft Overall." These victories celebrated both skillful navigation and spirited participation, embodying the community spirit of the Chester Raft Race.

Overall, the 2022 Chester Raft Race was a resounding success, bringing together participants and spectators to celebrate the spirit of camaraderie, creativity, and nostalgia. With its triumphant return, the event reaffirmed its status as a cherished tradition in the vibrant city of Chester, promising many more years of thrilling races and fond memories on the River Dee.

The event categories in the context of the Chester Raft Race typically refer to different aspects or criteria by which rafts are judged or awarded during the competition. In the 2023 the organisers updated the rules with a greater emphasis on speed and theme.

- Overall Winner
- Ladies Only
- Fastest Hostelry
- Fastest Innovation
- Greenest Raft
- Titanic Ultimate Sinkers Award

These event categories provide a diverse range of opportunities for participants to showcase their skills, creativity, and competitive spirit, contributing to the vibrant and inclusive atmosphere of the Chester Raft Race.

For the 2024 event after feedback from our rafters, Chester Raft Race has included a fastest raft category.

Overall Winner: Awarded to the raft that combines speed and theme creativity most effectively.

Fastest Raft: Recognizes the quickest raft regardless of theme, emphasizing speed and efficiency.

Ladies Only: Celebrates the fastest team composed exclusively of women, promoting inclusivity and recognition.

Fastest Hostelry: Acknowledges the fastest raft representing a pub, restaurant, or hotel, highlighting speed and local hospitality spirit.

Fastest Innovation: Honors the fastest raft utilizing non-traditional propulsion methods, showcasing ingenuity and creativity.

Greenest Raft: Recognizes the most eco-friendly raft construction, promoting sustainability and environmental consciousness.

Titanic Ultimate Sinkers Award: Humorously celebrates the fastest sinking raft, adding a lighthearted element to the event.

Chester Raft Race Overall Winners
Year	Raft	Team	Runners-Up
2023	Thunderbirds 2	Pigeons of Madagascar	
2022	Crocky Wok	Crocky Trail	
2020 and 2021		Races cancelled due to COVID-19	
2019	Crocky Wok	Crocky Trail	
2018	Crocky Wok	Crocky Trail	
2017	Crocky Wok	Crocky Trail	
2016	Traitor	Chester Auto Services	
2015	No Name Known	Survitec Group	
2014	In the Navy	Cheshire Waste and Skip Hire	
2013	Gloriana	Stanton Pyroplast	
2012	Contraflow	Sandbach Cave & Mountain Rescue	
2011	Contraflow	Sandbach Cave & Mountain Rescue	
2010	Dee Day Commandos	The Greyhound, Farndon	
2009	Wet Dream	Sandbach Cave & Mountain Rescue	
2008	Wet Dream	Sandbach Cave & Mountain Rescue	
2007		Cancelled - Floods	
2006	Wet Dream	Sandbach Cave & Mountain Rescue	
2005	Wet Dream	Sandbach Cave & Mountain Rescue	
2004	Wet Dream	Sandbach Cave & Mountain Rescue	
2003	Wet Dream	Sandbach Cave & Mountain Rescue	
2002	Wet Dream	Sandbach Cave & Mountain Rescue	
2001		Cancelled - Foot & Mouth	
2000	Wet Dream	Sandbach Cave & Mountain Rescue	
1999	Wet Dream	Sandbach Cave & Mountain Rescue	
1998	Wet Dream	Sandbach Cave & Mountain Rescue	
1997	Shy Talk	Shell UK, Stanlow	
1996	Shy Talk	Shell UK, Stanlow	
1995	Shy Talk	Shell UK, Stanlow	
1994	Panache	Jiffy Packaging	
1993	Panache	Jiffy Packaging	
1992	Panache	Jiffy Packaging	
1991	Panache	Jiffy Packaging	
1990	Stig	Shell UK Oil	

Ladies Only Raft Race Winners
Year	Team	Raft	Runners-up
2023	BOST Musicals	BOST 2	Share Bears
2022	BOST Musicals	BOST 2	Valley Lodge Nursing Home

Best Themed Rafts
Year	Theme	Winner	Runner-up
2023	Toybox	TBC	TBC
2023	Superheroes	Thunderbirds 2 &	Pigeons of Madagascar & Old Harkers Arms
2022	100 Years of British Television	Magic Roundabout	Old Harkers Arms
2020 and 2021		Races cancelled due to COVID-19	
2019	Transport through the Ages	The Duke	4C Access
