= The Leader (Welsh newspaper) =

Welsh newspaper

- Type: Daily newspaper
- Owner: Newsquest
- Founded: October 1973
- Language: English
- Headquarters: Mold, Wales
- Circulation: 3,041 (as of 2023)
- Website: www.leaderlive.co.uk

A previous Evening Leader logo, from the Wrexham edition

Former Evening Leader logo (1973–2006)

The Leader (formerly The Wrexham Evening Leader) is a daily newspaper in Wales which is distributed on weekday mornings, combining both local and national news.

There are two Leader editions in the north-east of Wales: in Wrexham and Flintshire with the Chester edition being terminated in 2018.

It is produced from an office in Mold. It was sold to Gannett by NWN Media in September 2017. NWN Media Ltd dissolved in January 2019 after being formed in 1920.

NWN titles de-registered from ABC measurement in 2015, but Newsquest re-registered them in 2018.

ABC figures from March 2024 show a total 3,041 copies for the Leader, with 35% (1,065 copies) attributed to the Flintshire edition and 65% to the Wrexham edition (1,977 copies).

The Leader celebrated 40 years of publishing in October 2013, having launched the first edition in October 1973.

A Wrexham Leader free edition used to be produced for Friday and Saturday delivery but was terminated in 2018, and the Wrexham office of the newspaper closed in December 2018.

On 3 April 2006, The Leader underwent a style change, and changed its logo to a new, more modern style. The old font and style had been used since the newspaper began.

From 14 September 2009, the paper shifted from being an evening paper called The Evening Leader to a morning paper entitled The Leader and adopted the current masthead.

The Saturday Leader was launched as a Saturday edition of the newspaper on 4 August 2018; however, it was stopped in December 2019.
