= History of Chester =

Aspect of British history

The history of Chester extends back nearly two millennia, covering all periods of British history in between then and the present day. The city of Chester was founded as a fort, known as Deva Victrix, by the Romans in AD 70s, as early as AD 74 based on discovered lead pipes. The city was the scene of battles between warring Welsh and Saxon kingdoms throughout the post-Roman years until the Saxons strengthened the fort against raiding Danes.

Following the Norman Conquest in 1066, Chester came under the Earl of Chester. It became a centre of the defence against Welsh raiders and a launch point for raids on Ireland.

The city grew as a trading port until the power of the Port of Liverpool overtook it. However the city did not decline and during the Georgian and Victorian periods was seen as a place of escape from the more industrial cities of Manchester and Liverpool.

== Roman ==
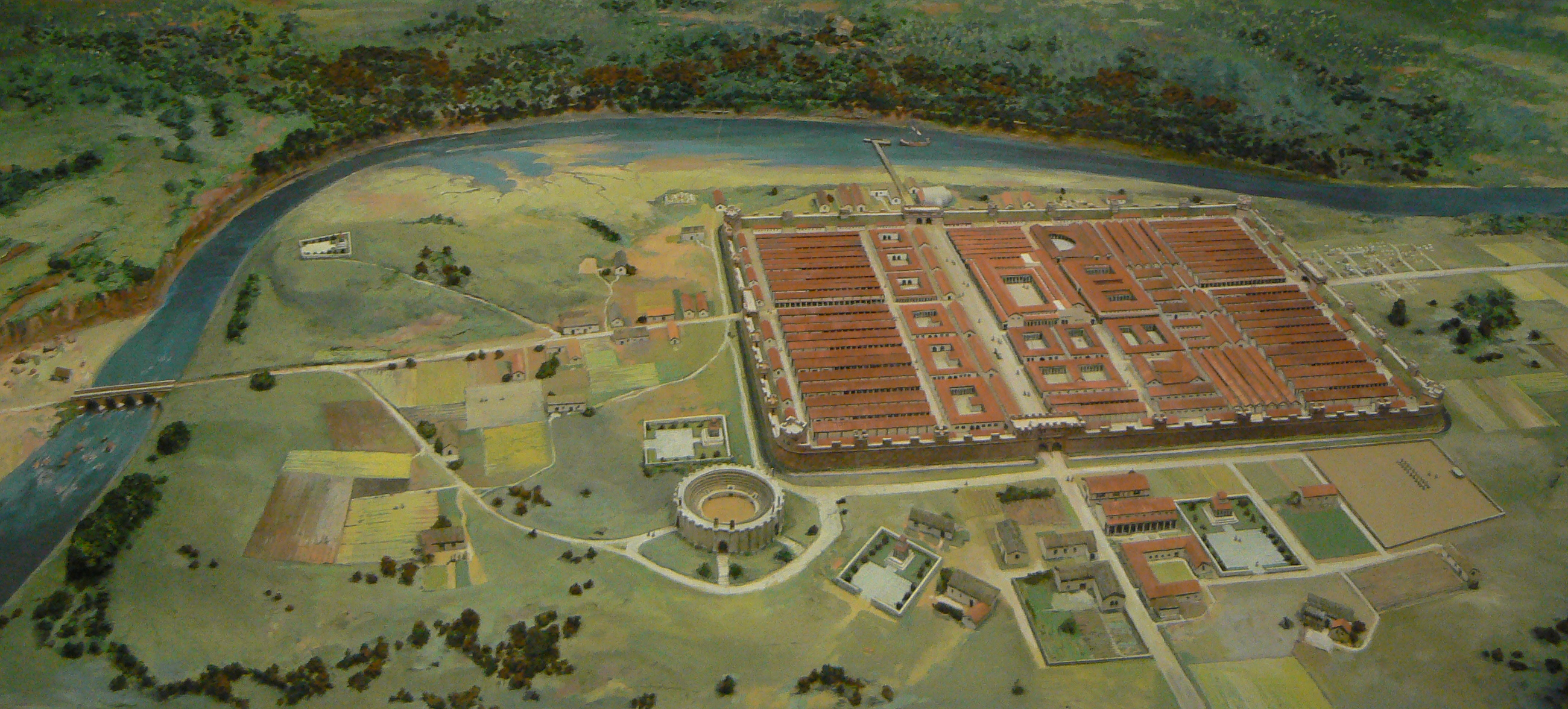
Model of how Deva Victrix would probably have looked

The Romans founded Chester as Deva Victrix in AD 70s in the land of the Celtic Cornovii, according to ancient cartographer Ptolemy, as a fortress during the Roman expansion north.

It was named Deva either after the goddess of the Dee, or directly from the British name for the river. The 'victrix' part of the name was taken from the title of the Legio XX Valeria Victrix who were based at Deva. A civilian settlement grew around the settlement, probably starting as a group of traders and their families who were profiting from trade with the fortress. The fortress was 20% larger than other fortresses in Britannia built around the same time at York (Eboracum) and Caerleon (Isca Augusta); this has led to the suggestion that the fortress may have been intended to become the capital of the Roman province rather than London (Londinium). A perhaps likelier explanation is that there was more tribal unrest in what is now northern England, and so a larger garrison was needed.

Chester Roman Amphitheatre was built in the 1st century AD. It could sit between 8,000 and 10,000 people, and is the largest known military amphitheatre in Britain. It is also a Scheduled Monument. The Minerva Shrine in the Roman quarry is the only rock-cut Roman shrine still in situ in Britain. The fortress was garrisoned by the legion until at least the late 4th century. Although the army would have abandoned the fortress by 410 when the Romans retreated from Britannia, the civilian settlement continued and its occupants probably continued to use the fortress and its defences as protection from raiders in the Irish Sea.

== Sub-Roman and Saxon period ==
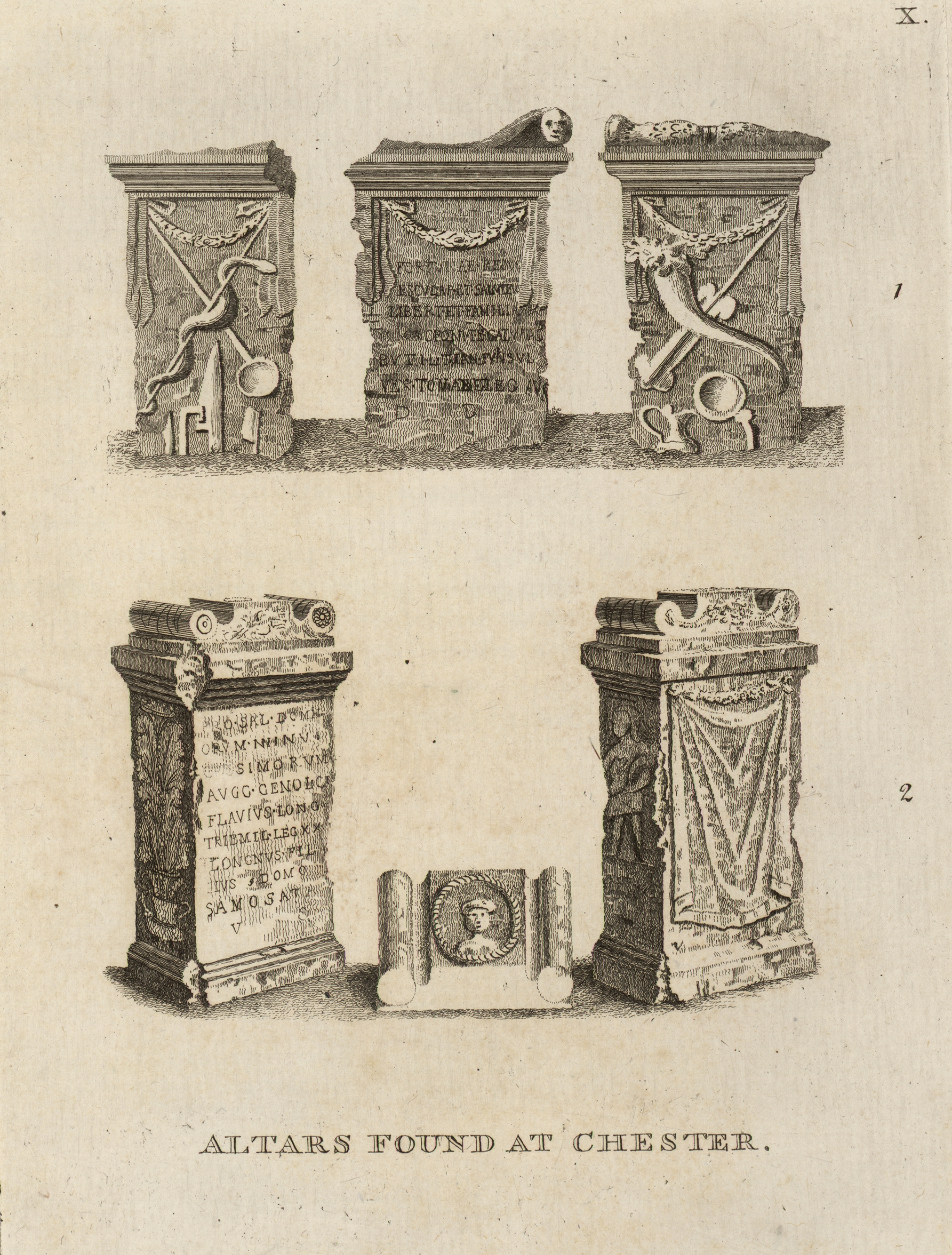
Ancient Altars found at Chester, from Thomas Pennant's A tour in Wales, 1778

The Roman withdrawal from Britain was effectively complete by 410 and the Britons established a number of successor states. The area of Chester is thought to have formed part of the kingdom of Powys, whose early kings claimed descent from the exile Vortigern. Chester is generally identified with the Cair Legion ("Fort Legion") listed as one of the 28 cities of Britain in the History of the Britons traditionally attributed to Nennius. In Welsh legend, King Arthur is said to have fought his ninth battle against the Saxon invasion at the "city of the legions" and later St Augustine came to the city to try and subjugate the Welsh bishops to his mission. In 616, Æthelfrith of Northumbria defeated a Welsh army at the Battle of Chester and probably established the Anglo-Saxon position in the area from then on.

The Anglo-Saxons adopted the native name as the calque Legeceaster, which over time was shortened to Ceaster and finally corrupted to Chester. In 689, King Æthelred of Mercia founded the Minster Church of West Mercia on what is considered to be an early Christian site and known as the Minster of St John the Baptist, Chester (now St John the Baptist's Church), which later became the city's first cathedral. In the 9th century, the body of Æthelred's niece, St Werburgh was removed from Hanbury in Staffordshire; in order to save its desecration by Danish marauders, she was reburied in the Church of SS Peter & Paul—later to become the Abbey Church and present cathedral. Her name is still remembered by the St Werburgh's Street which passes beside the cathedral. The Saxons extended and strengthened the city walls to protect the city against the Danes, who occupied it for a short time until Alfred seized all the cattle and laid waste the surrounding land to drive them out. In fact it was Alfred's daughter Æthelfleda, "Lady of the Mercians", who rebuilt the Saxon burh. In 907, she dedicated a new church to St Peter.

The Anglo-Saxon Chronicle records that, in 973, King Edgar came to Chester following his coronation at Bath. He held his court in a place located in what is now called "Edgar's Field", near the old Dee bridge in Handbridge. Taking a barge up the River Dee from his court to the Minster of St John the Baptist, Edgar supposedly took the helm of the vessel while it was rowed by six or eight tributary "kings" (Latin: reguli, lit. "little kings").

The Chronicles of Melrose and of Florence of Worcester describe that "eight petty kings, namely, Kynath, king of the Scots, Malcolm, king of the Cumbrians, Maccus, king of several isles and five others, named Dufnall, Siferth, Huwall, Jacob and Juchill, met him there as he had appointed and swore that they would be faithful to him, and assist him by land and by sea".

After the kings swore fealty and allegiance they rowed him back to the palace. As he entered he is reported to have said that with so many kings' allegiance his successors could boast themselves to be kings of the English.

== Middle Ages ==
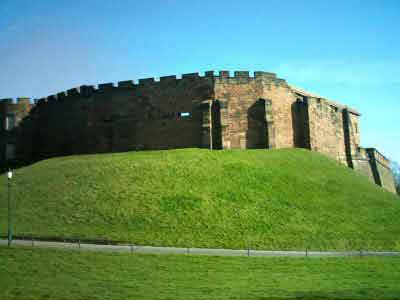
Chester Castle

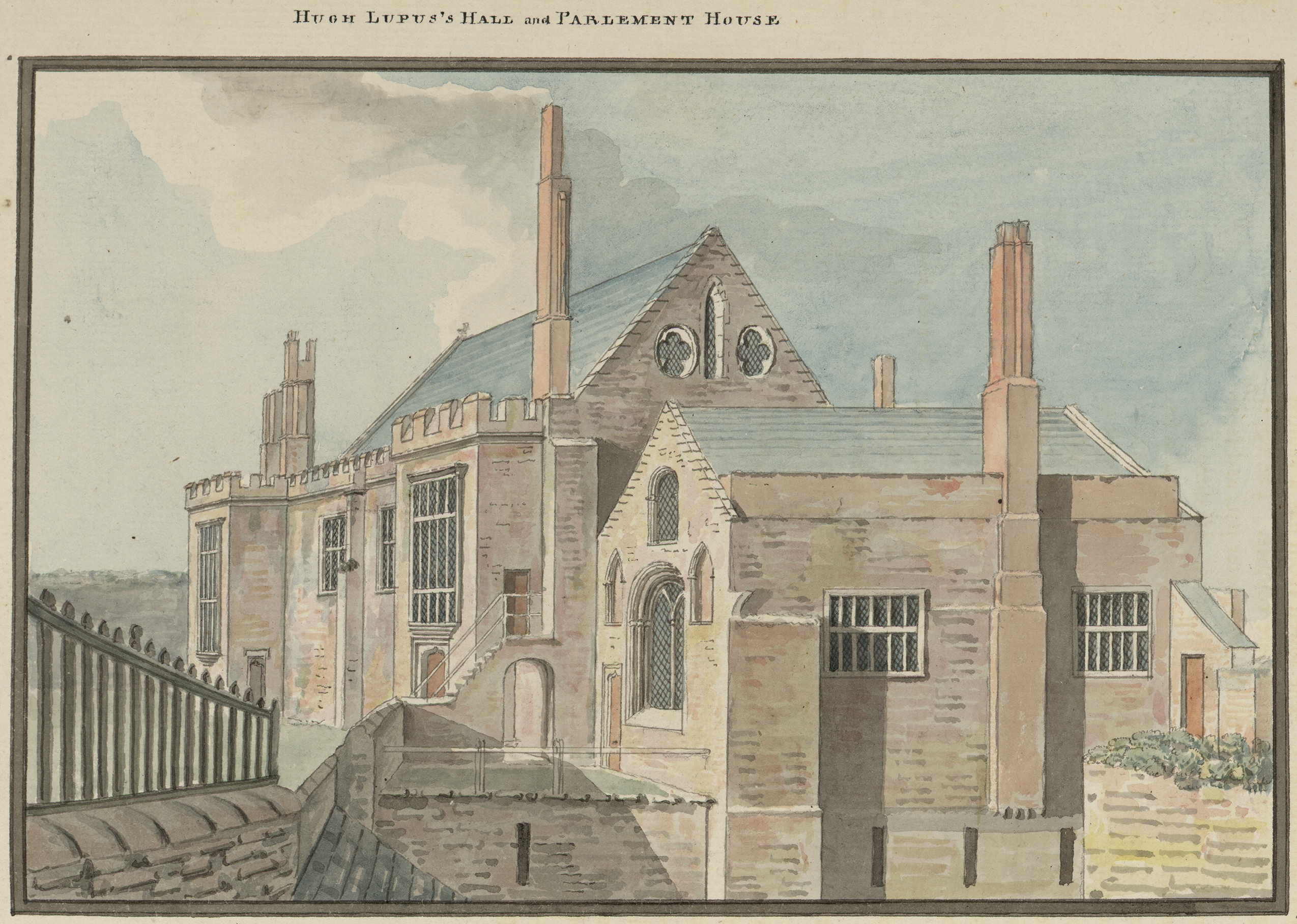
Hugh d'Avranches' Hall and Parliament House, Chester. c.1781

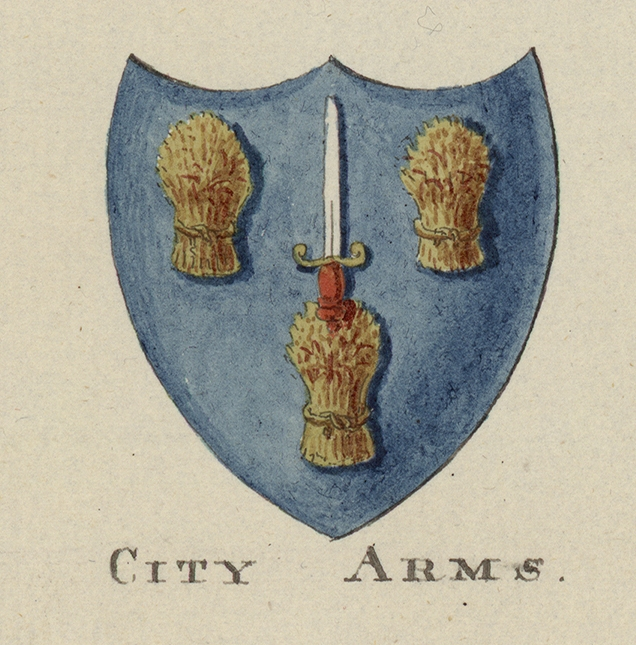
The arms granted to Chester City following to conquest

After the 1066 Norman Conquest and the Harrying of the North, the Normans took Chester, destroying 200 houses in the city. Hugh d'Avranches, the first Norman earl (it was first given to a Fleming, Gherbod, who never took up residence but returned to Flanders where he was captured, and later killed) was William's nephew. He built a motte and bailey near the river, as another defence from the Celts. It is now known as Chester Castle and was rebuilt in stone by Henry III in 1245, after the last of six Norman earls died without issue.

Chester's earls were a law unto themselves. They kept huge hunting forests - Hugo was said to have 'preferred falconers and huntsmen to the cultivators of the soil', and Ranulf I converted the Wirral farmlands into another hunting forest. Before Ranulph, Hugo's son had inherited at the age of seven but died in the White Ship, along with the king's heir, William, on his way to England from France, where he was educated under the guardianship of Henry I. Earl Ranulf II, Ranulph's son, even helped to capture King Stephen in 1140, and ended up controlling a third of England after supporting Henry II's claim to the throne.

Other earls were Hugh II, Ranulf III and John the Scot. The traditional independence that Chester had under the earls was confirmed by a charter of Richard II in 1398 stating that 'the said county of Chester shall be the principality of Chester'. The earls are remembered with their shields on the suspension bridge over the river Dee, and again on the Grosvenor Park lodge.

The first earl had endowed a great Benedictine monastery dedicated to Saint Werburgh in 1092 (on the site of the church of dedicated to St Peter and St Paul). The monastery was dissolved under Henry VIII in 1540 and was rededicated to Christ and the Blessed Virgin Mary to become Chester Cathedral. Previously, the first Chester Cathedral was begun in 1075 by the first Norman Bishop of Mercia, Peter de Leya after the See was moved from Lichfield in Chester. De Leya's successor moved the See to Coventry and it later returned to Lichfield. St John's became the co-Cathedral and Collegiate Church.

There is a popular belief that it was the silting of the River Dee that created the land which is now Chester's racecourse (known as the Roodee), on which a stone cross still stands which is said to have been erected in memory of Lady Trawst who died as a result of an image of the Virgin Mary called Holy Rood falling upon her in Hawarden church a few miles down the river). But the Roodee was in existence as early as the 13th and 14th centuries, so it cannot have been created by later silting. The silting which led to the creation of the Roodee, in its current form, is well established on a sequence of post-medieval maps dating from the later 16th century. It has also been established by archaeological evaluations and excavations in the area of the Old Port, known as the Roodee tail. Physical evidence for the silting of this area of the city is shown by the building of the 14th-century port watch tower, now known as the Water Tower, which projects from the north-west corner of the city walls. This tower was originally built out into the river. Maps of the 16th century, its archaeological form and related documentary evidence all demonstrate this.

Despite stories to the contrary, the weir above the Old Dee Bridge was not built by the Romans but by Hugh Lupus, Earl of Chester between 1077 and 1101 to hold water for his river mills. The purpose of the weir on the river was to keep water levels high for these mills, one of which gave rise to the traditional song "Miller of Dee", which reflects the attitude of the happy miller who was granted a monopoly on grinding. It also prevents the salty tidal waters from entering the Dee fresh water basin.

Chester's port flourished under Norman rule. In 1195 a monk, Lucian, wrote 'ships from Aquitaine, Spain, Ireland and Germany unload their cargoes of wine and other merchandise'. In fact wine was imported through only four other English ports. During the 13th century Chester was famous for its fur trade and even by the mid-16th century the port was importing large amounts of fur and skins. In 1543 one ship alone brought in '1600 shhep fells, 68 dere, 69 fawne skins and 6300 broke (badger skins)' .

However the estuary was silting up so that trading ships to the port of Chester had to harbour downstream at Neston, Parkgate, and "Hoyle Lake" or Hoylake.

Chester's first known mayor was William the Clerk. The second known mayor was Walter of Coventry, who served between 1241 and 1245. The town's third mayor was Walter de Livet (Levett) who was named as mayor in a royal decree from May 1246. (Walter of Coventry and Walter de Livet may be the same person.) During early Chester history, the mayor often held his position for 10 years or more; apparently the early mayor's terms were open-ended.

== Tudor and Stuart times ==
Originally the port was located to the north of the Watergate just below the city wall. To the south of the Watergate the Roodee existed in smaller form than today. The map sequence shows the river moving its course from against the wall north of the Watergate out to its current location between 1580 and approximately the 1830s. By the first edition OS map the river had reached its current position. However, it is apparent that some rivulets and inlets have been lost since, although some have been identified in archaeological work on the site of the former House of Industry and Gasworks.

In September 1642 tension between King Charles I and Parliament was growing and civil war looked like it might be a possibility. Charles visited Chester and ensured the election of pro-royalist mayor William Ince. In March 1643, leading Chester royalist Francis Gamull was commissioned to raise a regiment of foot to defend the city. Colonel Robert Ellis, an experienced soldier, was asked to construct outer defences to the city. A series of earthworks were constructed around the city from Boughton through Hoole and Newton to the Water Tower. The earthworks consisted of a ditch and mud wall with a series of 'mounts' or gun platforms were added along with turnpike gates on incoming roads.

Parliamentary forces began to lay siege to the city of Chester. In the early morning of 20 September 1645, parliamentary forces overran the eastern earthworks at the Boughton turnpike and captured the east suburbs of the city up to the walls. They began to construct cannon batteries within range of the city.

A cannon battery placed in St John's churchyard breached the city walls on 22 September near the Roman amphitheatre. A hole some 25 feet wide was made with thirty-two cannon shots. Following the breach an attempt was made to storm the city, but the defenders repelled the charge. According to an account at the time by Lord Byron, the breach was stopped up with woolpacks and featherbeds from all parts of the town. One can see to this day the repairs made to the wall, the section of which is next to the Roman Gardens (see photo below).

On the evening of 23 September 1645, King Charles I entered the City of Chester with 600 men via the Old Dee Bridge. He stayed the night at Sir Francis Gamull's house on Bridge Street. Also during the evening Sydenham Poyntz, a Parliamentarian in pursuit of the King's forces, entered Whitchurch (15 miles to the south) with 3000 horse. A battle looked likely.

Later that evening the King became aware of Poyntz's movements, as a messenger was intercepted at Holt. A decision was made to send out Lord Gerrard's horse troops and five hundred foot soldiers in the morning.

On the morning of 24 September 1645 the Battle of Rowton Heath occurred in moor land called Miller's Heath near the village of Rowton, two miles to the south east of Chester on the modern A41 road. Parliamentary forces crushed the Royalist loyal Cavaliers. The city was under siege at the time by the Parliamentary army. Royalist forces were coming to lift the siege and join up with Scottish allies, but were intercepted by Parliamentary Forces outside Chester.

The engagement lasted all day starting at 9am and continued throughout the day in three stages as Royalists were pushed back towards the City and its walls. The battle was mainly conducted on horseback with musketeers supporting the cavalry's flanks. As the battle went on into the afternoon, more troops were ordered to march out of the Northgate in support of the Royalists on Rowton Moor, but this decision was too late—the battle was already lost.

As the fighting reached the suburbs it was watched by King Charles I and Sir Francis Gamull from Chester's Phoenix Tower (now also called King Charles' Tower) on the city walls. The King quickly withdrew to the Cathedral tower, but even this was not safe, as the captain standing next to him was shot in the head by musket fire from the victorious Parliamentarians who took residence in the St John's Church tower.

The battle cost the lives of 600 Royalists and an unknown number of Parliamentarians. Among the Royalist dead was Lord Bernard Stuart (1622–1645) Earl of Lichfield, the king's cousin. His portrait is displayed in the National Gallery.

Also slain at the same time was William Lawes (1602–1645) a noted English composer and musician. He was buried in Chester Cathedral without a memorial. He was remembered by the king as the 'Father of Musick' and his portrait as a cavalier hangs in the Faculty of Music at Oxford.

Today there is a small memorial to the battle in the village of Rowton. It consists of a brief history and a battle plan of field at the time.

The next day the king slipped out of Chester and crossed the Old Dee Bridge en route to Denbigh. He left instructions for the city to hold out for 10 days more.

By 1646, after having refused to surrender nine times and with Lord Byron at the head of the city's defences, having only spring water and boiled wheat for lunch — the citizens (17,000) had already eaten their dogs — a treaty was signed. The mills and the waterworks lay in ruins. When the exultant Puritan forces were let loose on the city, despite the treaty, they destroyed religious icons including the high cross, which was not erected again for over three centuries. In 1646 King Charles I was proclaimed a traitor beside its base.

Worse was to come. The starved citizens then bore the full brunt of the plague, with 2099 people dead from the summer of 1647 to the following spring.

In 1643 Sir Richard Grosvenor petitioned the Assembly to enclose the Row which ran through the front of his town house on Lower Bridge Street, and his request was granted. At the time he was employed in the Royalist army as a Commander. Some speculate that perhaps the room was being used to organise the Royalist Resistance in Chester. In the years after the war, people further down the street also asked for the Row to be enclosed. Eventually Lower Bridge Street lost its rows. The only trace can now be found at number 11.

Most of Chester was rebuilt after the Civil War. There are many fine half-timbered houses dating from this time still standing today.

Chester port declined with most of the ships going from the colonies now going to Liverpool, although it was still the major port of passenger embarkation for Ireland until the early 19th century. A new port was established on the Wirral called Parkgate, but this also fell out of use. The road to the port of Chester was called the 'Great Irish Road' and ran from Bristol to Chester.

== Georgian and Victorian eras ==
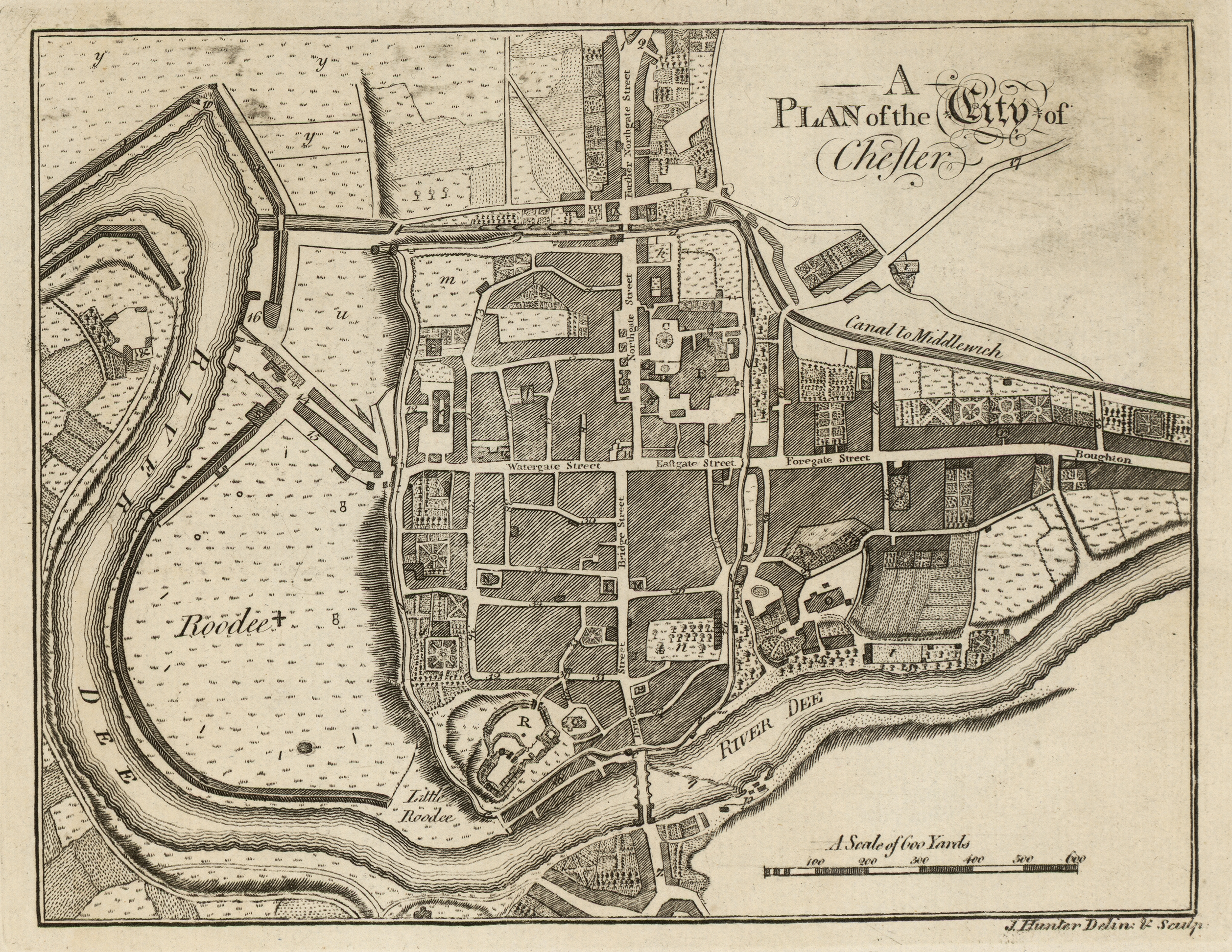
A plan of the city of Chester, c.1782

The port declined seriously from 1762 onwards. By 1840 it could no longer effectively compete with Liverpool as a port, although significant shipbuilding and ropemaking continued at Chester. It was once thought that Chester's maritime trade was brought to an end by the silting of the River Dee, although recent research has shown this was not the case. It was the use of larger ocean-going ships that led to the diversion of the trade to the relatively young town of Liverpool and other locations on the River Mersey, which had long been rivals to Chester, such as Runcorn.

In the Georgian era, Chester became again a centre of affluence, a town with elegant terraces where the landed aristocracy lived. This trend continued into the Industrial Revolution, when the city was populated with the upper classes in fleeing to a safe distance from the industrial sprawls of Manchester and Liverpool.

Edmond Halley (of comet fame) was the deputy controller of Chester Castle for a short time and on 10 May 1697 recorded a fall of one-inch hailstones in the area. William Molyneux was in exile here from Ireland in 1691 and was working on his book Dioptrics published in London the following year.

The Industrial Revolution brought the Chester Canal (now part of the Shropshire Union Canal) to the city (which was dubbed 'England's first unsuccessful canal', after its failure to bring heavy industry to Chester) as well as railways and two large central stations, only one of which remains. The building of the route to Holyhead involved one particularly notable tragedy, when a cast iron bridge over the river Dee just by the Roodee race course, collapsed. The Dee bridge disaster sent shock waves through the whole nation because there were many other bridges of similar design on the growing national rail network. Robert Stephenson was the engineer to the new line, and he came in for heavy criticism at the inquest held locally. The design was faulty, and many other bridges had to be demolished or replaced. In an attempt to strengthen the brittle cast-iron girders of the bridge, Stephenson added tough wrought-iron straps along the length of the spans, but, far from improving the structure, added little or no extra strength. A Royal Commission was set up to investigate the problem, and they confirmed the conclusions of the Railway Inspectorate that the design was deficient.

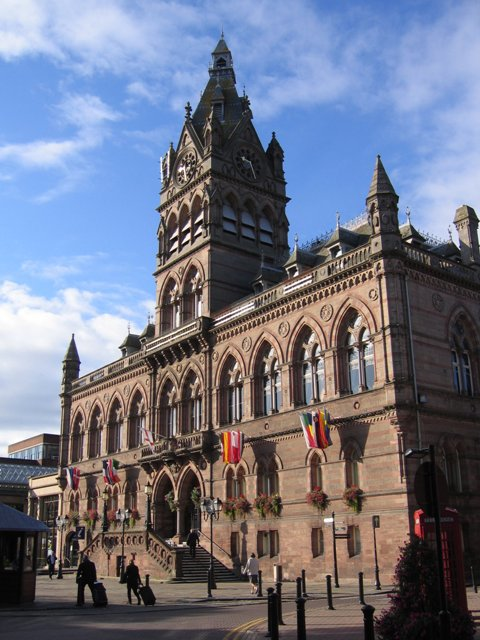
Chester Town Hall

A leadworks was established by the canal in 1799; its shot tower, which was used for making lead shot for the Napoleonic Wars, is the oldest remaining shot tower in the UK.

The Ruskinian Venetian Gothic Town Hall was ceremoniously opened by Prince of Wales in 1869; its design, following a public competition held to replace the Exchange building, which had stood at the centre of Northgate Street until it burnt down in 1862, was by William Henry Lynn (1829–1915) an Irish architect with a practice in Belfast. Along with the Cathedral Church of Christ & the Blessed Virgin Mary, it still dominates the city skyline. The Volunteer Street drill hall was completed in 1868. The three clock faces were added in 1980.

The Eastgate clock was also built at this time, and is a central feature as it crosses Eastgate street, and is part of the city walls. The clock is very popular with tourists, and this has given it the grand title of the second most photographed clock in the UK (perhaps even the world) after Big Ben.

== Second World War ==
Three people were killed, with 44 high explosive bombs, and 3 parachute mines. On 28 November 1940, 2 parachute mines were dropped, with 21 high explosives, and two people were killed. Another parachute mine was dropped on 25 November 1941.

== See also ==
- Chester
- List of people from Chester
- History of Cheshire
- History of England
- De laude Cestrie
