= Handbridge =

District of Chester, England

Coordinates: 53.18°N 2.89°W

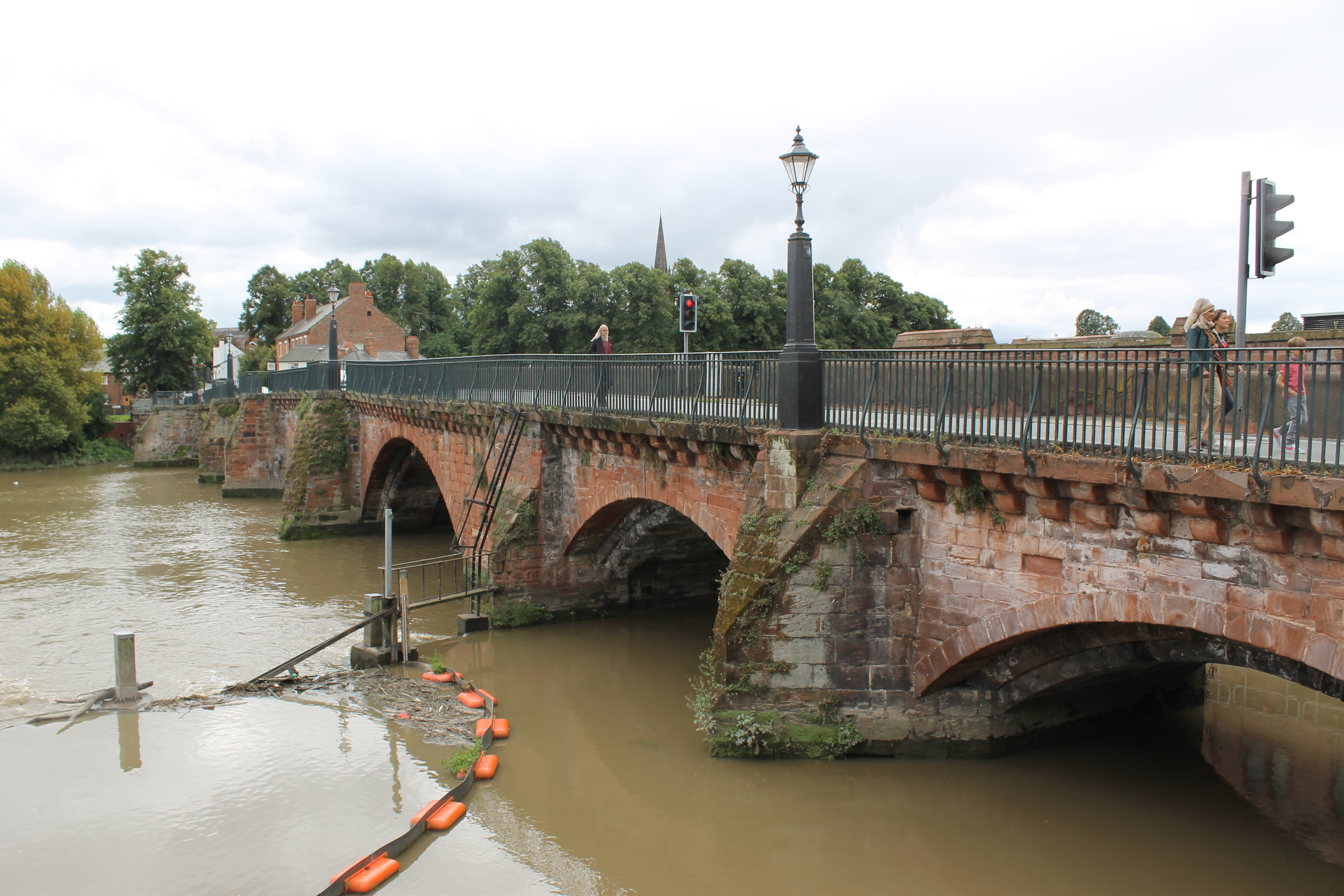

- Location within Cheshire
- Population: 4,223
- OS grid reference: SJ415655
- Unitary authority: Cheshire West and Chester
- Ceremonial county: Cheshire
- Region: North West
- Country: England
- Sovereign state: United Kingdom
- Post town: CHESTER
- Postcode district: CH4
- Dialling code: 01244
- Police: Cheshire
- Fire: Cheshire
- Ambulance: North West
- UK Parliament: Chester South and Eddisbury

Handbridge is a district of Chester, England, located on the south bank of the River Dee. It lies immediately south of the city centre and runs continuously into Queens Park.

Evidence suggests human activity in the area from at least the Iron Age, although the settlement expanded substantially during the Roman and post-Roman periods as Chester grew beyond its city walls. Historically, Handbridge has been associated with quarrying, river crossings, milling, and later residential and industrial development.

The district contains a primary school, Overleigh St Mary’s, and two secondary schools: Chester Catholic High School and Queens Park High School. Further education provision includes Cheshire College - South and West, formerly West Cheshire College, and Chester International School.

== History ==
=== Roman era ===
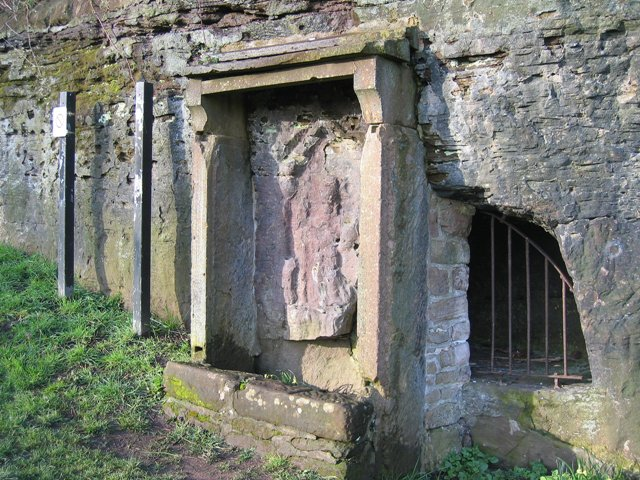
The Minerva Shrine

Although there is evidence of activity on the site since the Iron Age, the first known settlement developed shortly after the establishment of the Roman fortress of Deva around AD 74. Handbridge was built upon a large red sandstone outcrop, which was quarried extensively for use in constructing Chester’s city walls and buildings. Quarrying continued until the late fourth century AD.

The quarry site also contains a small Roman shrine carved directly into the rock face and dedicated to the goddess Minerva. Located at Edgar’s Field, the shrine is protected as a Grade I listed structure but has suffered weathering over time.

=== Post-Roman period ===
After the end of Roman rule, Chester declined and was subjected to repeated Viking raids, leading some later commentators to describe it as largely abandoned. Despite this, by the time of the Domesday Book the settlement at Handbridge had grown sufficiently to be divided into three manors: Overleigh, Netherleigh, and Royal Handbridge.

The Domesday Book also records frequent repairs to the river crossing at Handbridge, providing the earliest written reference to what later became known as the Old Dee Bridge.

Near the bridge lies Edgar’s Field, which has been suggested as a possible site of a royal palace belonging to Edgar of England. No archaeological evidence has been found to confirm this, but later legend recounts that six lesser kings rowed Edgar along the Dee to pledge their allegiance to him.

=== Middle Ages ===
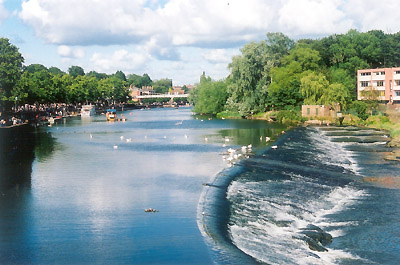
Chester Weir viewed from the Old Dee Bridge

The Welsh name for Handbridge is Treboeth. It was traditionally interpreted as meaning “the burnt town”, suggesting destruction by fire during the medieval period. More recent research proposes that the name may instead mean “the hot town”, reflecting a long history of metalworking in the area.

Several bridges were built and rebuilt at the Handbridge crossing after flood damage. The present Old Dee Bridge dates from 1353, although at least four earlier bridges occupied the same site. Due to its strategic importance during conflicts with Wales, the bridge was fortified with sentry posts, towers, and a drawbridge. In 1374, Richard II of England funded repairs following repeated drownings caused by its collapse.

Chester Weir was constructed in 1093 under the authority of Hugh Lupus to power watermills and improve river navigation. The mills operated under a legally enforced monopoly, requiring Chester residents to have their grain milled there. The behaviour of the millers gave rise to the song "Miller of Dee", from which the phrase became associated with dishonesty in medieval culture.

=== English Civil War ===
During the English Civil War, Chester was a key Royalist stronghold and was heavily besieged. Handbridge was burned and the Old Dee Bridge damaged to hinder Roundhead forces. Parliamentarian troops crossed the Dee at a ford approximately ten miles (16 km) upstream, leading to the Battle of Rowton Heath, after which Chester was effectively invested.

In 1645, Royalist defenders constructed a fort at Handbridge to protect the bridge approaches. Later that year, Parliamentarian forces linked their positions on both sides of the Dee using a bridge of boats, supported by gun emplacements on the Handbridge side.

=== Victorian era ===
During the Victorian era, many of the water-powered corn mills along the Dee closed and were replaced by hydroelectric installations supplying electricity to Chester. Handbridge was regarded as a predominantly working-class area, with residents employed in nearby factories, including tobacco works along the river and industries in neighbouring Saltney. Larger properties developed towards Queens Park, attracting middle- and upper-class residents seeking riverside housing.

At the western edge of the district, the Grosvenor Bridge was constructed to carry the main road to Wales. Designed by Thomas Harrison and opened by Queen Victoria in November 1833, it was the largest single-span bridge in the world for 30 years.

=== 20th century ===
Handbridge expanded during the 20th century with new schools, colleges, and housing developments serving both Handbridge and Queens Park. Notable developments included the Salmon Leap flats, designed by Gilling Dod and Partners and completed in 1967–68.

A small riverside cottage known as “Nowhere” has been associated with local legend. During a 1963 visit to Chester by The Beatles, John Lennon reportedly learned of the house, with the song "Nowhere Man" later being linked to the story.

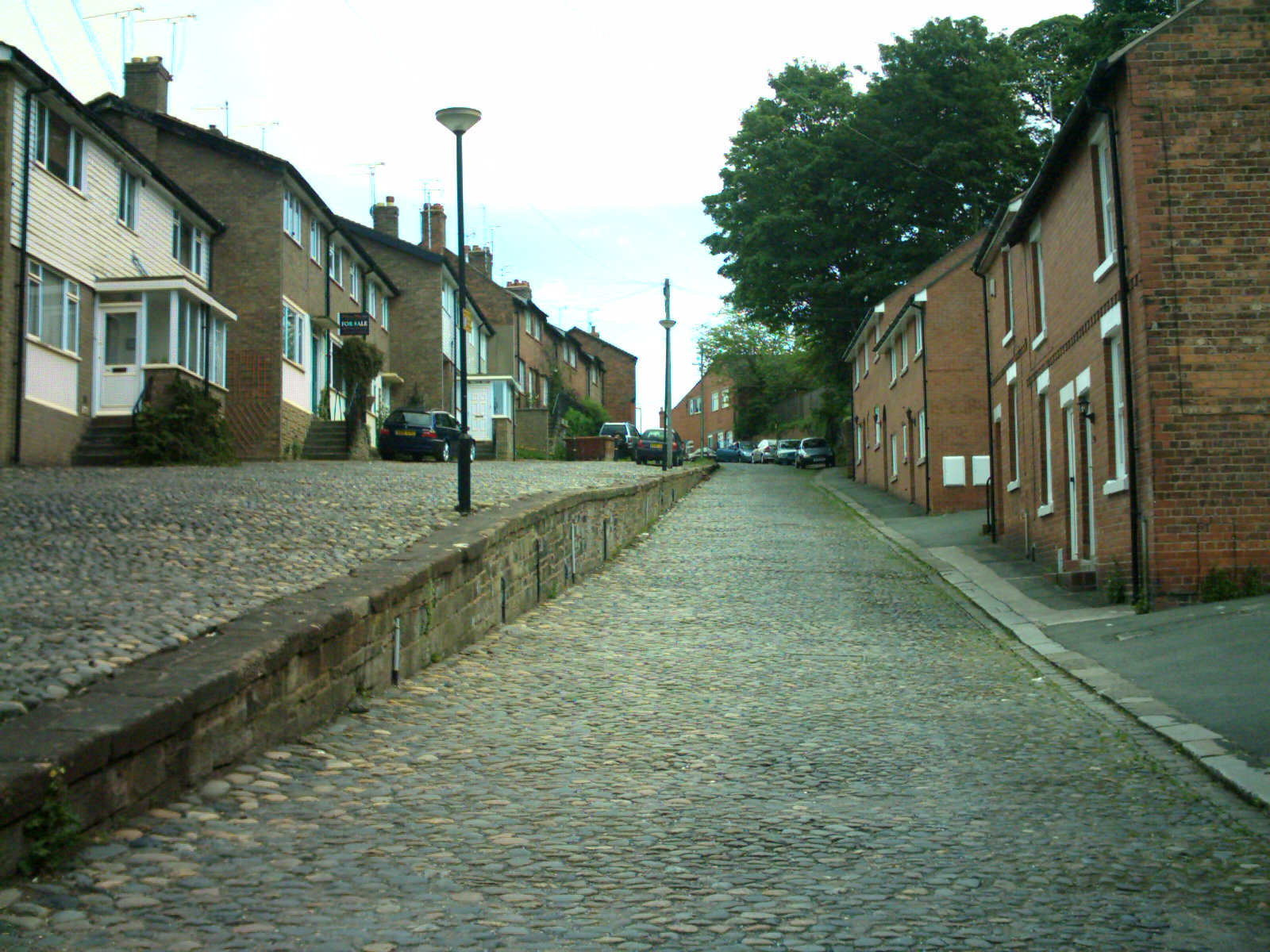
Greenway Street

== Governance ==
=== Local government ===
Since 1 April 2009, Handbridge has formed part of the Cheshire West and Chester unitary authority, having previously been administered by Chester City Council and Cheshire County Council.

Handbridge lies within the Handbridge Park ward of Cheshire West and Chester and is represented by two councillors.

The authority was elected in May 2008 and operated as a shadow council until the abolition of the former local authorities in April 2009.

=== Parliament ===
Following boundary changes implemented for the 2024 United Kingdom general election, Handbridge was transferred from the City of Chester constituency into the newly created Chester South and Eddisbury constituency.

Since the 2024 general election, Handbridge has been represented in the House of Commons by Aphra Brandreth of the Conservative Party, who was elected as the first Member of Parliament for the new constituency.

== See also ==
- Minerva's Shrine, Chester
- St Mary's Church, Handbridge
