= South Cheshire College =

Location
- Dane Bank Avenue; Crewe, Cheshire, CW2 8AB; England; 53°05′16″N 2°27′13″W

Information
- Type: Further Education College
- Established: 1968; 58 years ago
- Local authority: Cheshire East
- Department for Education URN: 130619 Tables
- Ofsted: Reports
- Principal: Jasbir Dhesi
- Age: 16+
- Website: scc.ac.uk

South Cheshire College is a former further education college, located in Crewe, Cheshire, England. The College was a single campus situated in a residential area about one mile from Crewe town centre. It also served students from Nantwich, Alsager, Middlewich, Sandbach, Congleton and throughout South and East Cheshire. The College also provided courses for adults at a range of centres, including high street locations in Middlewich and Congleton.

It merged in March 2017 with West Cheshire College to form Cheshire College – South & West, which retains the Crewe campus.

== History ==
The college began in 1843 as the Mechanics' Institution, run by the London and North Western Railway Company. It moved to its current site in 1966 and was officially opened by the Queen Mother in 1968. After several name changes, including Dane Bank College (which it is commonly known as locally), it became South Cheshire College in 1982. The original building was replaced by a brand new single campus building, started in 2008 and completed in 2010. The new campus is 4 stories high, but occupies a larger footprint than the original.

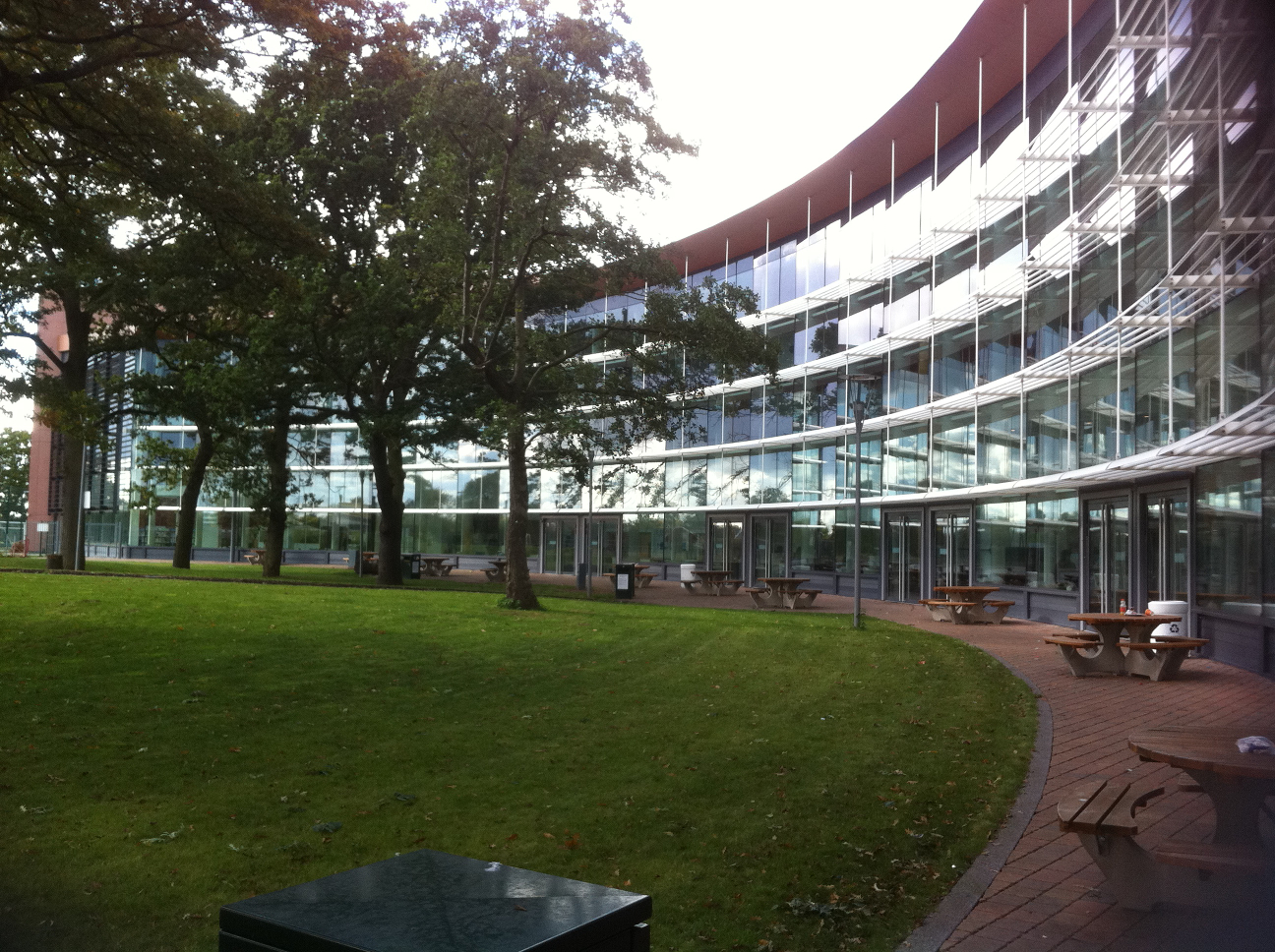
New building opened in September 2010

The design of the Crescent shaped atrium was driven by the requirement to retain an oak tree copse within the campus area. The atrium curves around the copse on one side and on the other, a moat separates the copse from other parts of the campus. Five buildings radiate from the Crescent site, including the Library building, the Theatre building and the other three buildings, named East, West and North, based on the general direction each one faces. These contain academic classrooms and vocational workshops.

In March 2017, Cheshire College - South and West was formed which was a combination of South Cheshire College in Crewe along with West Cheshire College which has a campus in both Chester and in Ellesmere Port.

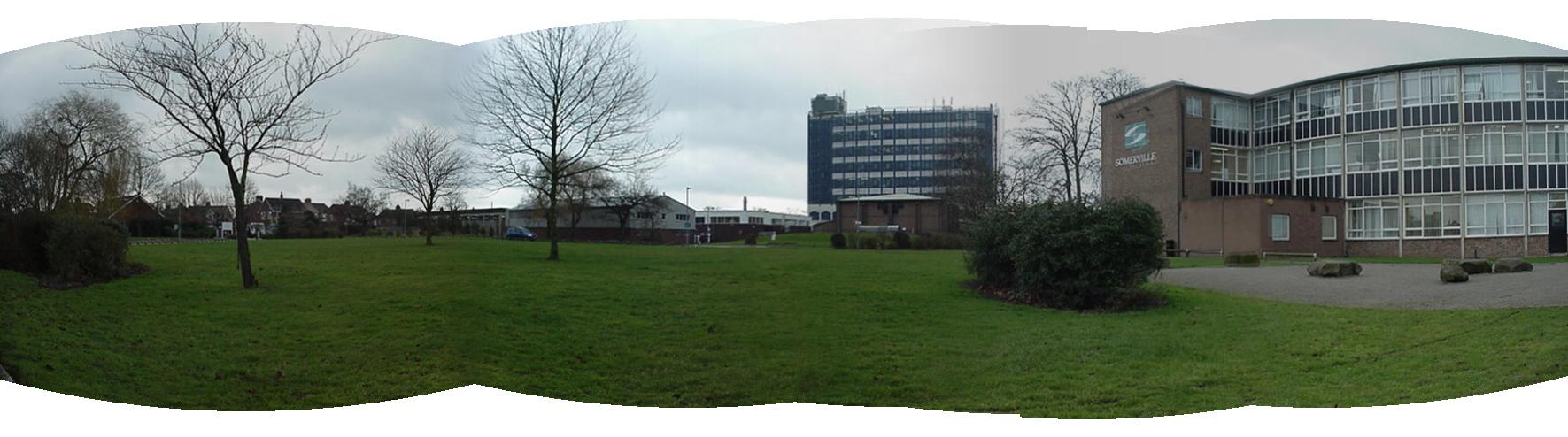
South Cheshire College panorama – rear view of old campus

== Alumni ==
- Tashi Dorje, tenor
- Chloe Lloyd, model
- Rick Moore, (born 1989), cricketer
- Simon Radley, chef
- Laura Smith, Member of Parliament (MP) for Crewe and Nantwich from the 2017 general election until 2019.

== Awards ==
The College has received numerous awards, including coming top in the 2004 Ofsted report.
