= Tashi Dorje =

Tibetan tenor

Tashi Dorje (also known as Yuan Qu) (born 29 November 1966) is a Tibetan tenor trained in Italian opera. He performs as a soloist with Shen Yun Performing Arts under his Chinese name, Yuan Qu. Dorje was born in Chamdo, Eastern Tibet.

After getting a medical degree and practicing as a doctor in rural Tibet, he auditioned to join a performing arts group. He studied singing in Beijing, and became a soloist with the Chinese National Orchestra. Dorje subsequently went to Europe, training with famed operatic singers including Eduardo Giménez and Carlo Bergonzi. Dorje has performed around the world, including in China, Spain, Great Britain, Italy, Sweden and the United States, and has won singing competitions in Paris, Florence and New York. He speaks Tibetan, Chinese, Italian, Spanish, and English.

== Early life ==
Dorje was born in Eastern Tibet on 29 November 1966, just before the Cultural Revolution in China. In 1975, he was among more than 500 children sent to Beijing by the government. While in Beijing, Dorje was exposed to a contraband recording of Luciano Pavarotti’s “O Sole Mio."

Despite his passion for the arts, authorities decided that Dorje should receive medical training; he was sent to school to become a doctor. Following completion of his medical training, Dorje was assigned to a remote Tibetan village to establish a medical practice, but never gave up on his wish to become a professional singer. After several years, he auditioned and was admitted to an arts troupe in his hometown of Chamdo. Later, he studied in Beijing, earning a master's degree at the Beijing Vocal Music Research Institute in 1993. He became a soloist with the Chinese National Orchestra, a national folk music ensemble.

== Career ==
In 1997, Dorje went to Spain to participate in the Francisco Viñas International Vocal Competition. In 1998, he began studying under María Soler and Eduardo Giménez at the Conservatori Superior de Música del Liceu in Barcelona. He later trained under Carlo Bergonzi in Buseto, Italy, and Isabel Penagos in Madrid.

Dorje has maintained a connection with his native Tibet. In 2003 he performed at the Dalai Lama’s Interfaith Service at the Washington National Cathedral, and the following year he performed at a “Free Tibet" concert in Amsterdam.

In 2005, Dorje placed in international singing competitions in Barcelona and Florence, and won gold prize in Florence. In 2006, he won first prize with a performance of “La fanciulla del West" in the Bel canto division of the Europe Overseas Chinese Singing Contest, held in Paris, France.

In 2008, while studying at South Cheshire College in Britain, Dorje beat out 7,000 other contestants to reach the final auditions for the British talent search programme, The X Factor.
