= West Cheshire College =

Academic institution in United Kingdom

Coordinates: 53.276958°N 2.909641°W

- Type: Vocational college
- Established: 1963 (As Chester College of Further Education)
- Location: Chester (Handbridge) and Ellesmere Port, United Kingdom
- Website: West Cheshire College

West Cheshire College was a further education, vocational college in the North West of England. It had over 20,000 students at its two main campuses in Ellesmere Port and Chester as well as in workplaces and community venues. In March 2017 it was merged with South Cheshire College, based in Crewe, to form Cheshire College – South & West, which as of 2020 retains the Ellesmere Port and Chester campuses.

== History ==
West Cheshire College's origins can be traced back to the early 19th Century when a number of scientific, literary and philosophical societies were formed in Chester to promote and encourage learning and the expansion of knowledge.

From the formation of these societies further education in the area expanded rapidly with lectures taking place at The Grosvenor Museum in Chester from 1886. Demand forced lessons and workshops to be taught at a number of community centres throughout the area. This decentralised approach to Further Education lasted throughout the first half of the 20th century until the Handbridge site was purchased in 1948 and plans for the Chester College of Further Education were officially drawn up. Since the official opening of the College buildings in 1963 it has developed and expanded with campuses at Blacon and Greenbank being used from the 1980s until 2001 and 2004 respectively. The Grange Centre was used from 1986. Capenhurst Technology Campus became part of West Cheshire College in 1999 when Engineering and Motor Vehicle departments were relocated from Handbridge. The present West Cheshire College campuses are at Chester and Ellesmere Port.

== Courses ==
It offers full and part-time vocational courses in a range of subjects and disciplines to adults and 14- to 19-year-olds. The College also offers Higher Education courses, Foundation Degrees and courses leading to recognised professional qualifications (such as CMI, CIPD, ILEX, AAT, IAB and ICM). The College has also launched a new range of Higher National Certificates and Diplomas (HNC/Ds).

In addition, the college offers apprenticeships across different job sectors including accountancy, active leisure and learning, beauty therapy, brickwork, construction, business administration, carpentry and joinery, cleaning and support services, contact centre, creative and digital media, customer service, engineering, hairdressing, health and social care, hospitality and catering, IT, painting and decorating, pharmacy, retail, supply chain management, vehicle maintenance and warehousing and storage. The College currently has over 500 Apprentices working within these job sectors.

West Cheshire College carries out training for the Cheshire Oaks Retail Academy (CORA) training individuals as well as internationally recognised brands.

The college's "Business Solutions" team also provides training to employers across the region providing bespoke training. The College currently works with large multi-nationals such as Vauxhall, Unilever and Bank of America as well as SMEs throughout the region. The college's "Business Solutions" team was presented with Unionlearn's Quality Award for the success of their employer Apprenticeship programmes. Unionlearn is part of the TUC and works with TUC affiliate unions and employers on learning, skills and workforce development. The award was presented to the team for their work with Aintree University Hospitals Trust in Liverpool.

In West Cheshire College's Ofsted report in 2010, the College was awarded 14 Outstanding grades including quality of provision, capacity to improve and for its overall effectiveness with employers. The college's latest Ofsted inspection report, published on 15 April 2014, found its overall effectiveness "requires improvement". The report's summary stated that, "Too few learners on advanced level courses pass or make better than adequate progress. Programmes do not consistently meet their needs or sufficiently prepare them for progression to higher education or employment. Not enough teaching is good and assessment practices lack rigour and challenge. Observations of teaching and learning are not consistently rigorous enough to ensure that individuals and curriculum areas are clear about what to address to improve teaching and learning quickly. The college does not sufficiently capture students’ destinations. Not all curriculum area self-assessment reports are sufficiently self-critical. Best practice is not shared sufficiently between the successful apprenticeship provision and weaker classroom-based provision, particularly where they are in the same curriculum area. The importance of English and mathematics skills is not given sufficient priority in all subject areas". However, the 2014 report also noted that there was, "Good apprenticeship provision", a "highly flexible response to meet the changing needs of employers and students", that "the energetic and inclusive senior leadership team has strengthened the focus on improving the quality of provision" and that "the college provides good support for vulnerable students".

West Cheshire College has undergone a £65 million new build project with new developments in both Chester and Ellesmere Port. The new science and technologies Campus in Chester opened March 2011 and the new Ellesmere Port creative and services industries Campus opened in September 2011.

In February 2014, West Cheshire College received the Investors in People Silver Standard award. In June 2014 it was reported in the Chester Chronicle the college had fallen on hard financial times and thus was looking to cut more than 100 jobs and close its Chester campus to save more than £3 million. In January 2015, the college announced that its Handbridge campus would indeed be closing. Reporting the closure, the Chester Chronicle said, "The college says that their financial position is due to a high level of borrowing taken out to finance the college re-build and its declining trading position, and the excessive long term borrowing which the college now faces is 'a result of the size, location and financing of the new builds in 2011'".

== Facilities ==
West Cheshire College provides a range of facilities and services to its students and the wider community. These include a hairdressing salon, fine dining restaurant, theatre, dance studio, health centre, conference facilities, gym, business lounge and creche. Also, the College has recently launched a lean manufacturing line training facility at its Chester Campus.
