= Boughton, Cheshire =

Area of Chester, Cheshire, England

Coordinates: 53.187°N 2.884°W

Boughton
- Location within Cheshire
- Population: 5,444 (2011.Ward)
- OS grid reference: SJ415667
- Unitary authority: Cheshire West and Chester
- Ceremonial county: Cheshire
- Region: North West
- Country: England
- Sovereign state: United Kingdom
- Post town: CHESTER
- Postcode district: CH3
- Dialling code: 01244
- Police: Cheshire
- Fire: Cheshire
- Ambulance: North West
- UK Parliament: Chester North and Neston

Boughton is a neighbourhood to the east of Chester city centre, part of the unitary authority of Cheshire West and Chester and the ceremonial county of Cheshire, England. It is located atop the steep banks of the River Dee as it turns the meadows bend for the last time around the 'Earls Eye' before flowing into Chester.

Most of Boughton forms part of an unparished area which until 1974 comprised the county borough of Chester. The adjoining areas of Boughton Heath and Vicars Cross lie within the separate civil parish of Great Boughton, which is outside the boundaries of the city of Chester.

== History and landmarks ==
The name 'Boughton' or 'bluestone' may have originated from the placement of a blue boundary stone (now lost) alongside the road similar to the Gloverstone which stood outside Chester Castle.

The Romans were known to have used water flowing from a well in the area. The water was piped directly into the centre of the Roman fortress of Deva (present day Chester). How long this waterway operated is unknown, but by medieval times it had been either restored or rebuilt, for the use of the Benedictine Abbey of St Werburgh in Chester (later Chester Cathedral).

Water was conveyed to the fortress by a lead pipeline. Part of the aqueduct was found during the construction of the Grosvenor Park Lodge.

A major find from Boughton was a large Roman altar standing almost four feet high. It was discovered by workmen in 1821 toppled over in a field (now lost) called 'The Daniels' near the present day water works. The altar was damaged by a pickaxe before it was realised what it was. The altar marked the position of the wellhead for the springs for the Roman fortress. It is dedicated to the 'Nymphs and fountains of the Twentieth Legion (Legio XX Valeria Victrix)'. The inscription is on both sides. The altar was purchased privately by the Duke of Westminster and is now in the private grounds of Eaton Hall.

In medieval times the area was home to Spital Boughton, a community which grew around a Leper hospital founded there in the 12th century by Ranulph de Gernon, 2nd Earl of Chester. The word (ho)Spital gave Spital Boughton its name. The hospital operated for over 500 years and today its location is marked by the old cemetery of St Giles.

The inscription is visible from the road:
St Giles Cemetery. Here stood the leper hospital and chapel of St Giles. Founded early in the 12th century and endowed by successive Norman earls of Chester they remained in constant use until 1643. When defensive measures during the siege of Chester necessitated the demolition of buildings outside the city walls. The cemetery remained to mark the site and in time the little village of Spital Boughton clustered around it. In 1644 the royalist defenders suffered great loss of life in a gallant sortie in Boughton and many of the fallen were buried here. It was also used for victims of the plagues which ravaged the city in the 16th and 17th centuries. Being extra parochial the site was granted to the corporation by Charles II in 1685. As a burial ground and through for a period in the charge of St Johns parish. It remains in their hands. When Protestant martyr George Marsh was burned at the stake on gallows hill close by his ashes were collected by his friends and buried here. The last burial took place in 1854.

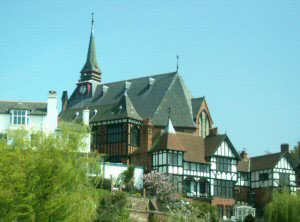
Boughton St Paul's Church

St. Paul's Church in Boughton was redesigned by the Victorian architect John Douglas, who also lived in Boughton.

George Marsh, a preacher from Bolton was martyred in Boughton by being burned at the stake on 24 April 1555. In 1898 Nessie Brown erected an obelisk as a memorial to him. Nessie Brown was a member of the influential Brown family of Chester, and lived in the area. The obelisk was moved to the current location after the road was widened. The inscription reads:

George Marsh born Dean Co. Lancaster. To the memory of George Marsh martyr who was burned to death near this spot for the truth sake 24 April 1555. Also John Plessington 19 July 1679. Canonised saint 25 October 1970.

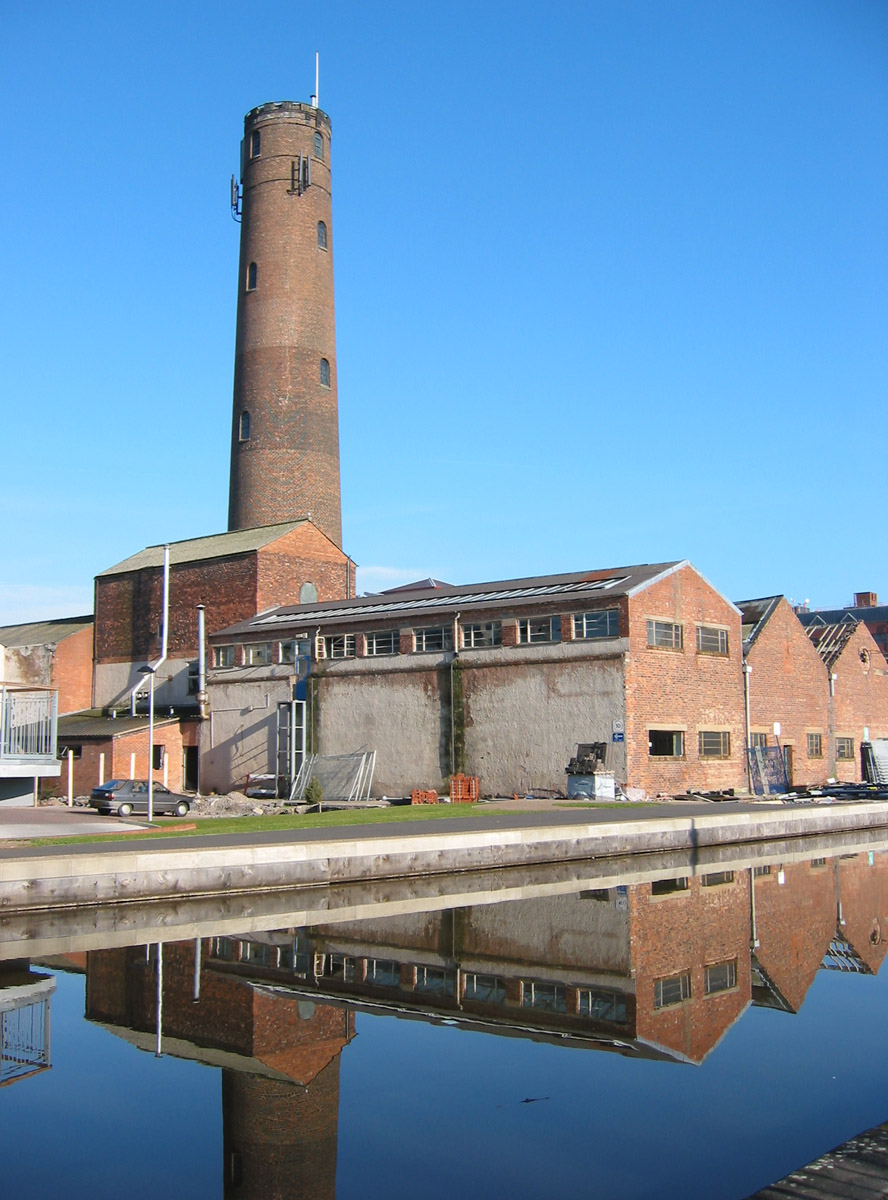
Boughton Shot Tower

1–5 Christleton Road (between the A41 and the A51 roads ) was designed for the Co-Operative society by the Cheshire architect John Douglas in 1900. A more elaborate building and a fountain were planned but not constructed.

The 'Lead Shot Tower', where molten lead was once dropped over 40 metres to form perfect spheres for use in guns, is today a landmark. The Shropshire Union Canal, a means of transportation in the industrial age, passes through Boughton.

The leadworks is currently (as of 2019) being redeveloped as an apartment complex retaining the original shot tower.

== Notable residents ==
- John Douglas The famous Victorian architect.
- Thomas Hughes author of 'Tom Brown's Schooldays' lived for a time in a large house overlooking the River near Barrel Well Hill.
- Ian Blair former Commissioner for Metropolitan Police, when he was Sir Ian Blair, now Lord Blair of Boughton, grew up in a house on Sandy Lane.
- Jeff Fleet, current chairman of the Cenny Club (now hosted weekly in the Cherry)
- Curtly Ambrose lived for a time at the top of Stocks Lane while playing cricket for Boughton Hall.
