= Queens Park, Chester =

Coordinates: 53.1835°N 2.8747°W

Queen's Park
- Location within Cheshire
- OS grid reference: SJ415655
- Unitary authority: Cheshire West and Chester
- Ceremonial county: Cheshire
- Region: North West
- Country: England
- Sovereign state: United Kingdom
- Post town: Chester
- Postcode district: CH4
- Dialling code: 01244
- Police: Cheshire
- Fire: Cheshire
- Ambulance: North West
- UK Parliament: Chester South and Eddisbury

Queen's Park is a suburb of Chester, in Cheshire, England. It lies to the south of Chester city centre on the southern bank of the River Dee, Wales, immediately east of Handbridge. The area is primarily residential and is linked to the city centre by the pedestrian Queens Park Suspension Bridge.

The suburb takes its name from Queen's Park, Chester, a riverside public park and cricket ground.

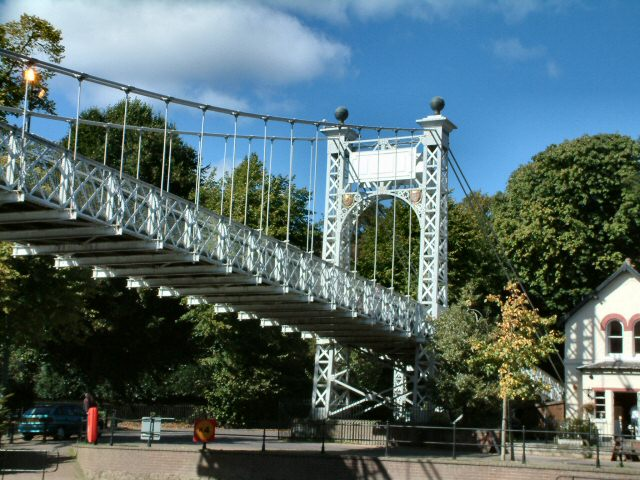
Queen's Park Suspension Bridge

== Geography ==
Queen's Park is situated on the southern bank of the River Dee, Wales, opposite Chester city centre. The suburb is connected to the city centre by the pedestrian Queens Park Suspension Bridge, which provides a direct walking route into the historic city.

The surrounding area includes the suburb of Handbridge to the west and residential districts extending further south towards the outskirts of Chester.

== History ==
Queen's Park developed largely during the late 19th and early 20th centuries as a residential suburb of Chester. Its growth was influenced by the expansion of the city beyond the River Dee and the development of improved pedestrian access to the city centre.

The Queens Park Suspension Bridge was opened in 1923, creating a direct pedestrian connection between the suburb and the city centre and helping to strengthen links with the commercial and civic areas of Chester.

== Education ==
Queen's Park High School is located within the suburb.

The University of Chester also has a campus at Queen's Park, which houses the university's business and management school and associated academic facilities.

== Governance ==
Queen's Park forms part of the unitary authority area of Cheshire West and Chester.

For representation in the Parliament of the United Kingdom, the suburb is within the Chester South and Eddisbury constituency, which has been represented by Aphra Brandreth of the Conservative Party since the 2024 United Kingdom general election.

== See also ==
- Queens Park Suspension Bridge
- Queen's Park High School
- University of Chester
