= Deva Victrix =

Roman fort built mid 70s AD

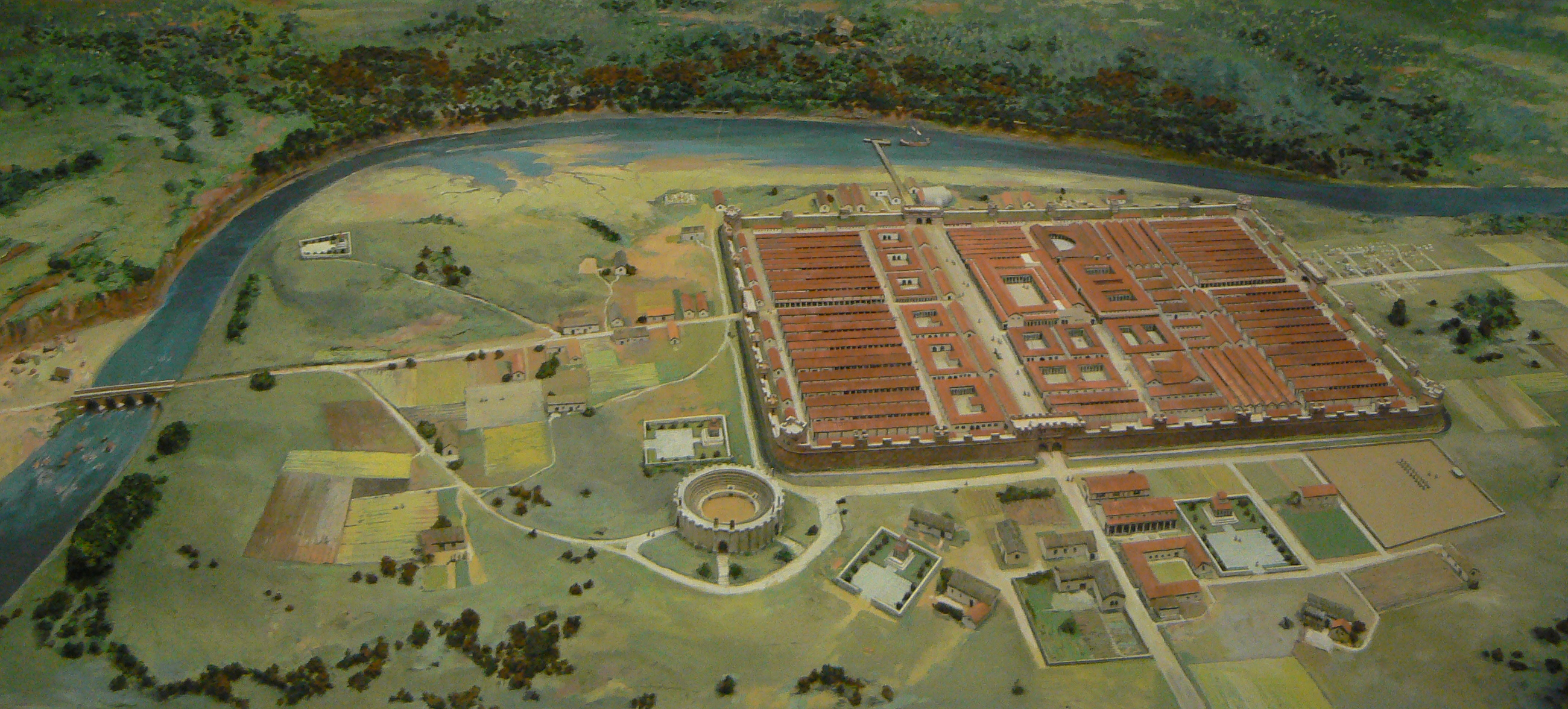
- A model of Deva Victrix (c. 3rd century CE) at the Grosvenor Museum, Chester

- Location within England
- 53°11′29″N 02°53′34″W
- Type: Fortification and settlement
- Periods: Roman Imperial
- Location: Chester, Cheshire, England
- Region: Britannia

History
- Built: Mid 70s AD

Deva Victrix, or simply Deva, was a legionary fortress and town in the Roman province of Britannia on the site of the modern city of Chester. The fortress was built by the Legio II Adiutrix in the 70s AD as the Roman army advanced north against the Brigantes, and rebuilt completely over the next few decades by the Legio XX Valeria Victrix. In the early 3rd century the fortress was again rebuilt. The legion probably remained at the fortress until the late 4th or early 5th century, upon which it fell into disuse.

A civilian settlement, or canaba, grew around the fortress. Chester's Roman Amphitheatre, south-east of the fortress, is the largest-known military amphitheatre in Britain. The civilian settlement remained after the Romans departed, eventually becoming the present-day city of Chester. There were peripheral settlements around Roman Deva, including Boughton, the source of the garrison's water supply, and Handbridge, the site of a sandstone quarry and Minerva's Shrine. The shrine is the only in situ, rock-cut Roman shrine in Great Britain.

The fortress contained barracks, granaries, headquarters, military baths, and an unusual elliptical building which had it been finished may have been intended to act as the governor of Britain's headquarters.

== History ==
=== Etymology ===
As both Scottish rivers named Dee, River Dee in Galloway and River Dee in Aberdeenshire, were recorded by Ptolemy (in Greek) as Δηούα ποταμος (Dēva or Deva river), it may be assumed that also the πόλις (city) of Δηούα (Dēva or Deva) was named after the homonymous river, though the related estuary was called Σετηΐα εἴσχυσις (estuary of Setēïa) by this geographer. The interpretation that the name of the city had been adopted directly from the British name of the river is well established. It is thought that the title "victrix" in the name of the fortress was taken from the title of the Legio XX Valeria Victrix who were based at Deva; victrix is Latin for victorious. The name for the city of Chester derives from the Latin word castrum (plural: castra), meaning "fort" or "army camp"; "-chester" and "-caster" are common suffixes in the names of other English cities that began as Roman fortresses.

=== Foundation ===
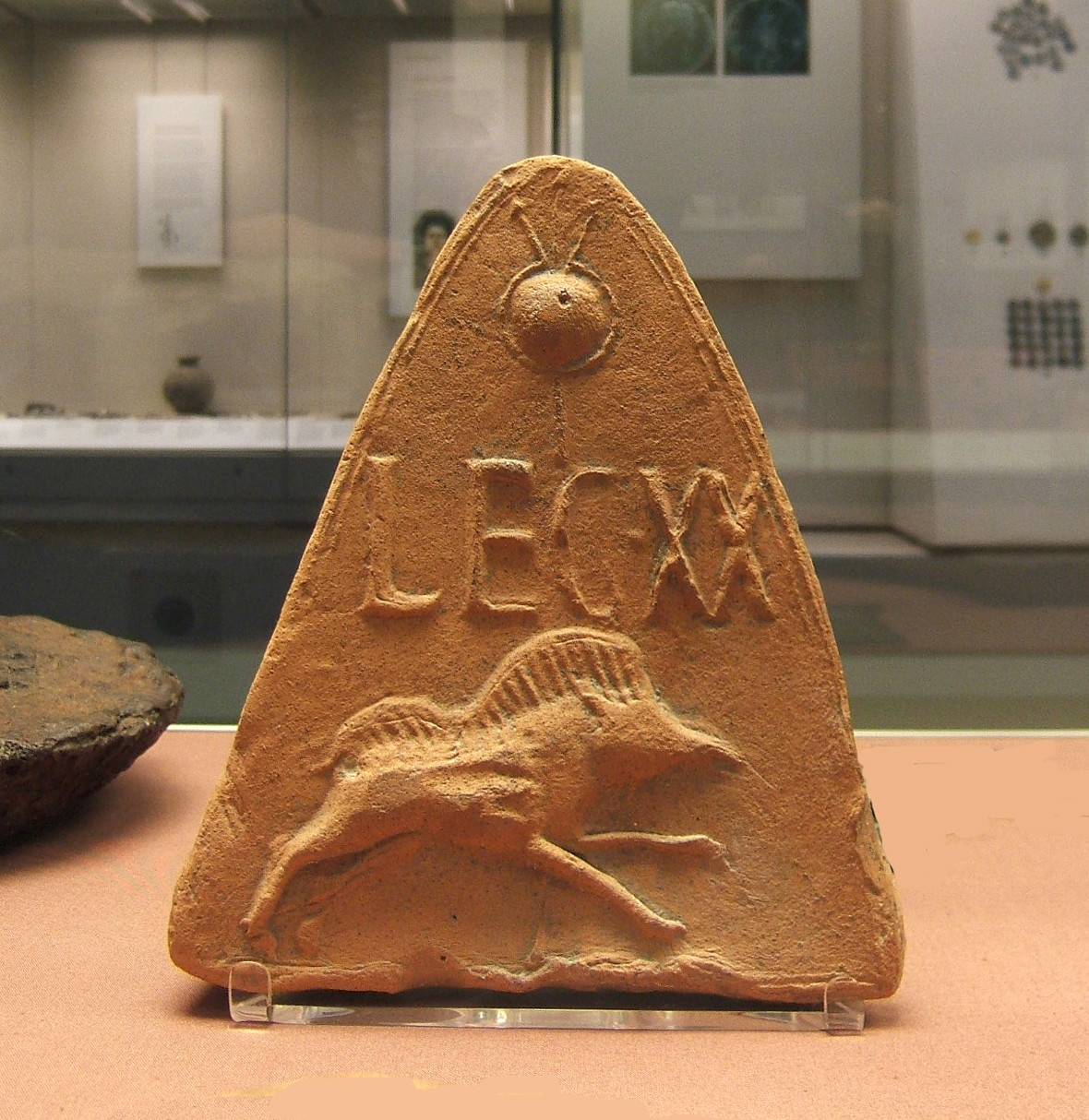
A moulded antefix roof tile showing the badge and standard of Legion XX, from Holt, in north Wales

According to the 1st- and 2nd-century geographer Ptolemy, Deva was in the lands of the Cornovii. Their land bordered that of the Brigantes in the north and the Ordovices in the west and included parts of what is now Cheshire, Shropshire, and north Wales. When the Romans' treaty with the Brigantes—who occupied most of what is now Northern England—failed the Romans embarked on military conquest of the area. The campaigns were initially led by Sextus Julius Frontinus and later Gnaeus Julius Agricola. Their expansion into the north of Britannia during the reign of Vespasian meant that the Romans needed a new military base. Chester was a strategic site for a fortress, commanding access to the sea via the River Dee and dividing the Brigantes from the Ordovices. Legio II Adiutrix was sent to Chester and began the construction of a legionary fortress in the mid-70s AD.

The fortress was built on a sandstone bluff, overlooking the bridge crossing the river and close to the natural harbour which is today occupied by the Chester Racecourse. The bend in the River Dee provided protection from the south and the west. The river was navigable up to the sandstone ridge, so positioning the fortress beyond it would have made access to the harbour difficult. The fortress may have required up to 2.4 million litres (530,000 imp gal) of water a day, supplied by fresh water piped in from natural springs in the suburb of Boughton 1.6 kilometres (1 mi) to the east.

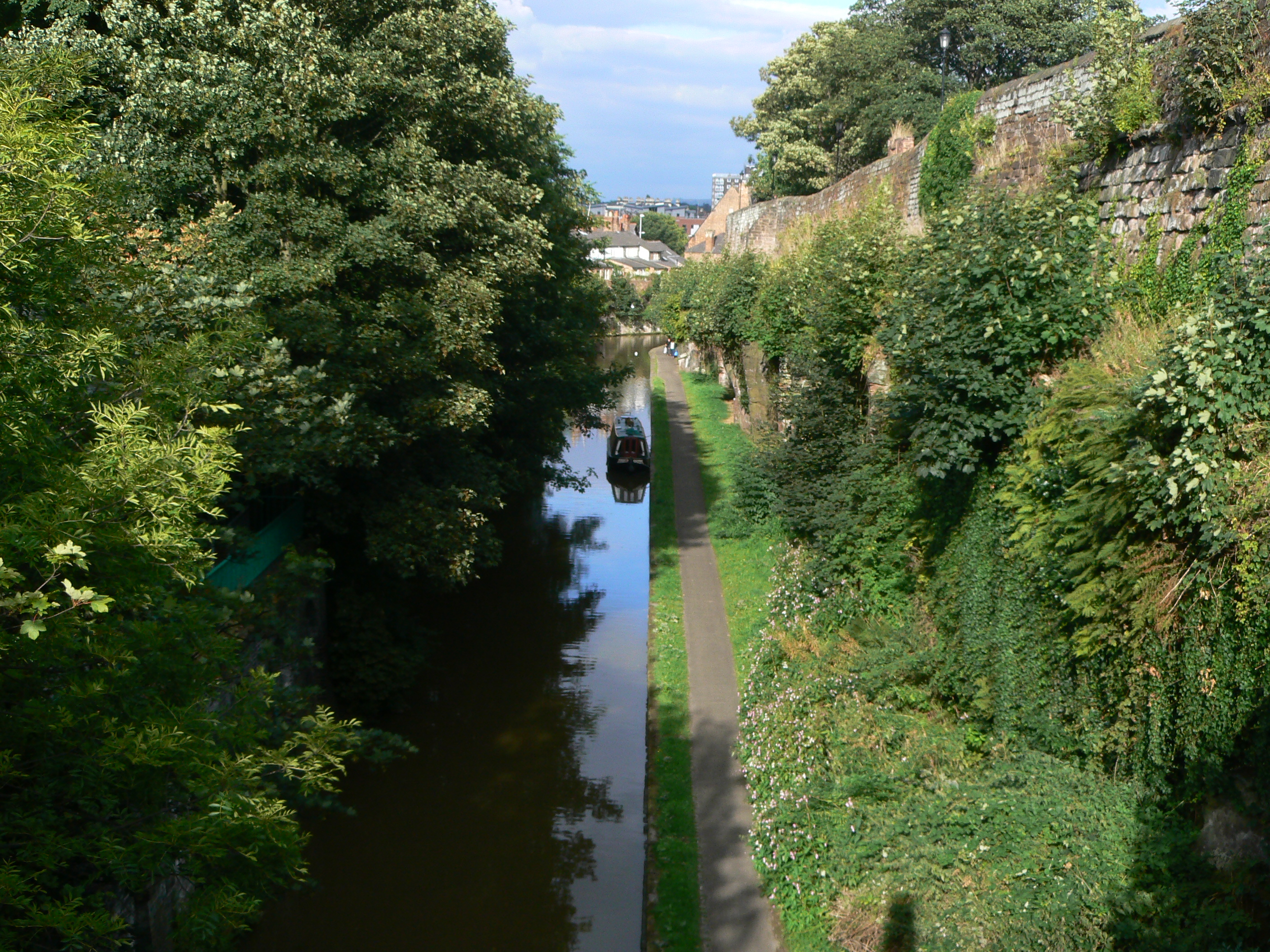
An original section of the Roman fortress wall is visible from the Northgate.

Lead ingots discovered in Chester indicate that construction was probably under way by 74 AD. There may already have been military buildings on the site, but if so they were demolished to allow the construction of the fortress. The first buildings were constructed from wood, probably for convenience. They were gradually replaced by more permanent structures built from locally quarried sandstone. Defence was provided by a 6-metre-wide (20 ft) rampart and a ditch 3 metres (10 ft) wide and 1.5 metres (5 ft) deep. The rampart was made from turf laid over sand, clay, rubble, and layers of logs.

The fortress was laid out in the traditional "playing card" shape—rectangular with rounded corners—and had four gates: north, east, south and west. It covered 25 hectares (62 acres), making it the largest constructed in Britain during the 70s. An estimated 24,664 metric tons (24,274 long tons; 27,187 short tons) of timber was used in the first phase of the fortress's construction; buildings outside but associated with the fortress, such as the harbour and the amphitheatre, would have required an additional 31,128 metric tons (30,636 long tons; 34,313 short tons). The fortress contained barracks, granaries (horrea), headquarters (principia) and baths (thermae). The barrack blocks each measured 82.5 by 11.8 metres (271 by 39 ft) and were built using wattle and daub.

=== Under Legio XX Valeria Victrix ===
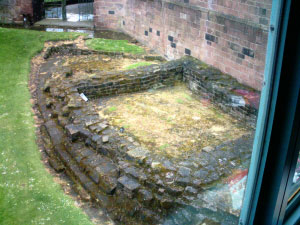
Foundations of the Roman south-east corner tower, one of the 22 towers built by the Legio XX Valeria Victrix

Chester, showing the Deva Legionary Fortress and the Roman Roads and some of the building locations. (See The Port section below for discussion on the quay wall and pier possibility)

In 88 AD, the Emperor Domitian ordered the Legio II Adiutrix to the lower Danube. The Legio XX Valeria Victrix was deployed to garrison Deva Victrix, abandoning the fort they had been building in Scotland, at Inchtuthil. On their arrival they began to rebuild Deva, first in timber and from the end of the 1st century in stone. The new stone fortress walls were 1.36 metres (4.5 ft) thick at the base and 1.06 metres (3.5 ft) thick at the top. Located at regular intervals, approximately 60 metres (200 ft) apart, along the walls were 22 towers about 6.5 metres (21 ft) square. The defensive ditch was re-dug and was 7.5 metres (25 ft) wide and 2.45 metres (8 ft) deep. An estimated 55,452 metric tons (54,576 long tons; 61,125 short tons) of stone were used to build the new fortress defences. The timber barracks were replaced with stone buildings of a similar size.

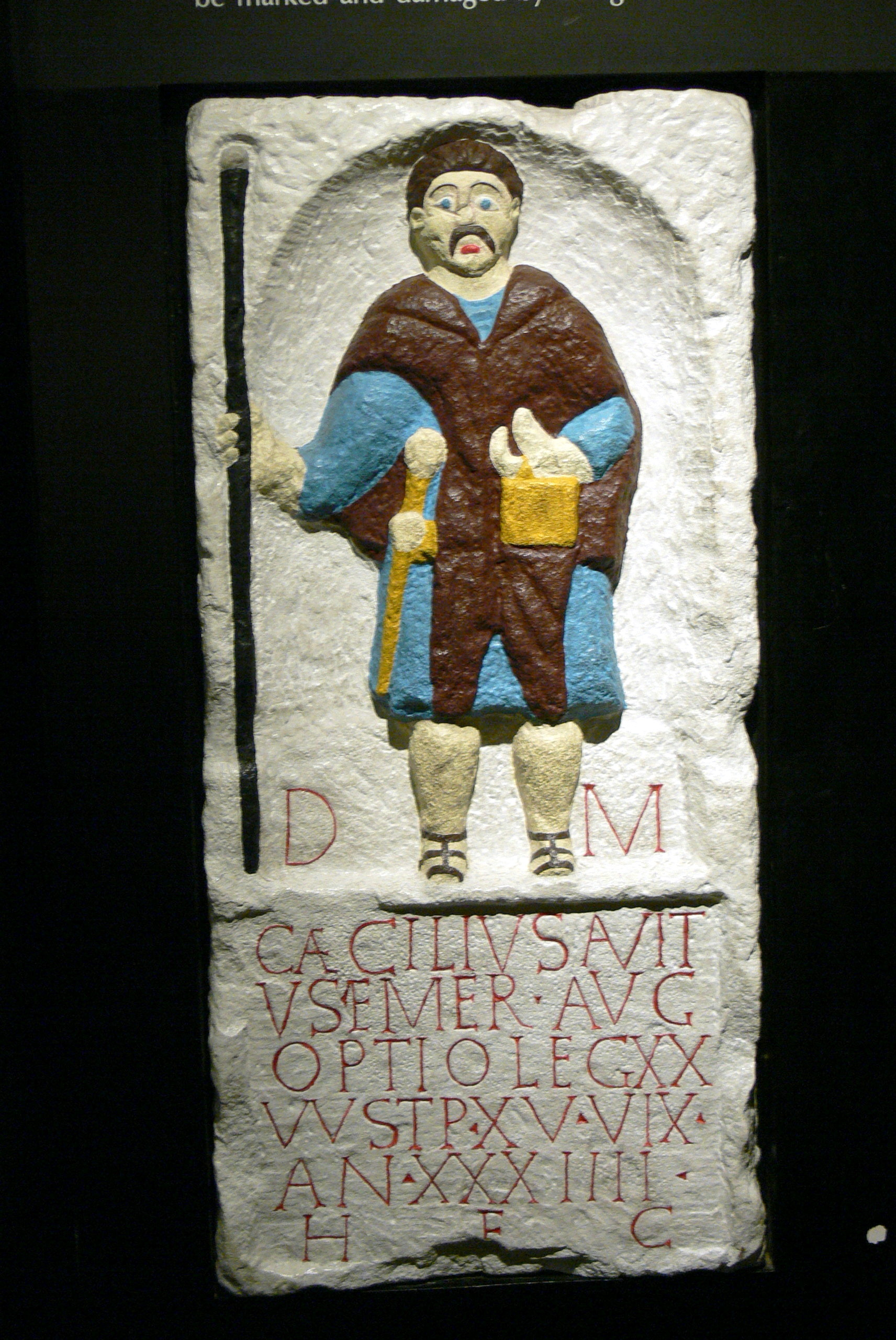
A Roman tombstone depicting Caecilius Avitus, an optio in the Legio XX Valeria Victrix

During the 2nd century, at least part of the Legio XX Valeria Victrix took part in the construction of Hadrian's Wall, leading to some sections of the fortress being abandoned and others being allowed to fall into disrepair. The Legio XX Valeria Victrix probably went on campaign in 196 under Decimus Clodius Albinus into Gaul, leaving Deva under-garrisoned. They would have suffered heavy losses in Gaul before returning to Britain.

Following attacks against barbarians in the early 3rd century under Septimius Severus, the fortress at Deva was again rebuilt, this time using an estimated 309,181 metric tons (304,298 long tons; 340,814 short tons) of stone. During the 4th century the size of the legion, and therefore of the garrison, may have diminished in line with the rest of the empire's forces.

=== Decline and abandonment ===
Most of the fortress's major buildings were still being maintained in the second half of the 4th century and the barracks were still inhabited. Before 383 AD, soldiers at Chester were being paid by coins from the imperial mints; after this the soldiers may have been removed by Magnus Maximus when he invaded Gaul in 383. The Notitia Dignitatum, written in around 395, does not record any military units garrisoned at Deva, indicating the fortress was no longer used by the military at this stage. If it was still used by the military, this would have ended by 410 when the Romans retreated from Britannia and the Western Roman Emperor Honorius told the cities of Britain to look to their own defences against invaders. The civilians probably continued to use the fortress and its defences as protection from raiders from the Irish Sea.

Inhabitation of Chester continued on a lesser scale once the legions had left. Buildings would have fallen into disrepair, although some of the larger structures are known to have survived for some time. The town nevertheless probably remained the military and administrative centre of the region. After the arrival of the Anglo-Saxons, the settlement became known as Legacaestir, meaning "City of the Legions" in Old English. Medieval chroniclers believed the church of Saint Peter and Saint Paul—later the site of Chester Cathedral—to be of Roman origin, although no evidence has been discovered to support this. When Chester became an Anglo-Saxon burh in 907, the walls of the fortress were repaired and incorporated into the defences. Much of the Roman masonry was reused in later periods.

=== Later history and investigation ===
In the 14th century, Ranulf Higden, a monk in Chester, described some of the Roman remains, including the sewers and tombstones. Antiquarians began to take interest in the remains in the 17th century and interest continued to grow in the 18th century, fed by accounts of Roman Chester and discoveries such as an altar to Jupiter Tanarus. Jupiter Tanarus—also Taranis—was the Romanised version of the god Taranis who was the equivalent of Jupiter the god of thunder. In 1725, William Stukeley recorded the Roman arches of the east gate; they were demolished in 1768. Over the next century, accidental discoveries continued, such as parts of the Roman bath complex outside the fortress which were destroyed by a late-18th-century housing development.

The Chester Archaeological Society, founded in 1849, acquired artefacts discovered in Chester and undertook excavations where possible; the Grosvenor Museum was opened in 1886 to allow the public to view the society's collection. The society continued to work in Chester, recording information on the fortress and its surrounding settlement, often as building works destroyed the sites. Between 1962 and 1999, about 50 excavations were carried out in and around the fortress, revealing new information about Deva Victrix. Between 2007 and 2009, excavations were carried out at the amphitheatre on behalf of Chester City Council and in association with English Heritage.

== Civilian settlement ==
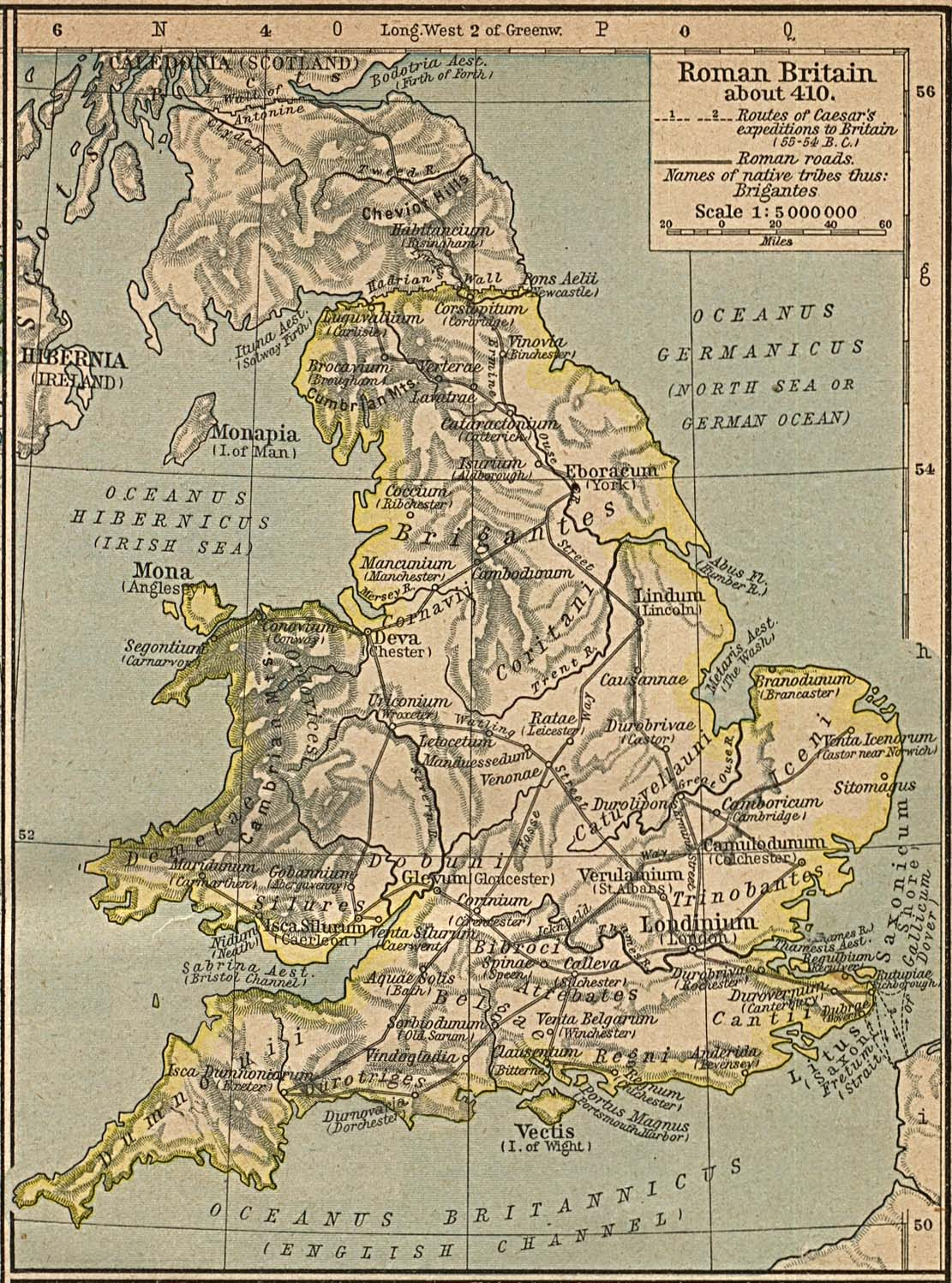
Roman Britain in 410 AD, showing Deva's location on the Irish sea (Oceanus Hibernicus)

A civilian settlement (canabae legionis) was gradually established outside the walls of the fortress; it probably began as a collection of traders who became prosperous from dealing with the fortress. The settlement was administered by an elected council rather than by the legion. As legionaries retired many settled in the canabae legionis, effectively making it a veteran colony. Cemeteries were located alongside the roads leading to the settlement, beyond built-up areas. The Grosvenor Museum has over 150 tombstones, the largest collection of Roman tombstones from a single site in Britain. Most of them were used to repair the north wall in the 4th century. Settlement extended around the fortress to the east, south, and west; shops fronted the roadside for about 300 metres (980 ft) beyond the fortress walls. To the east was the legion's parade ground, civilian baths were built to the west, and to the south was a mansio, a large coaching house for travelling government officials. The buildings of the canabae legionis were originally timber, but during the early 2nd century began to be rebuilt in stone. The settlement expanded throughout the 2nd and 3rd centuries as the population increased. Once the legion had left, the civilian settlement continued, eventually becoming part of the town of Chester.

Indeed, scholars such as Christopher Snyder believe that during the 5th and 6th centuries—approximately from 410 AD when Roman legions withdrew, to 597 AD when St. Augustine of Canterbury arrived—southern Britain preserved a sub-Roman society that was able to survive the attacks from the Anglo-Saxons and even use a vernacular Latin (called British Latin) for an active culture. There is even the possibility that this vernacular Latin lasted to the late seventh century in the area of Chester, where amphorae and archaeological remnants of a local Romano-British culture at Deva Victrix have been found.

== Legionary quarry ==
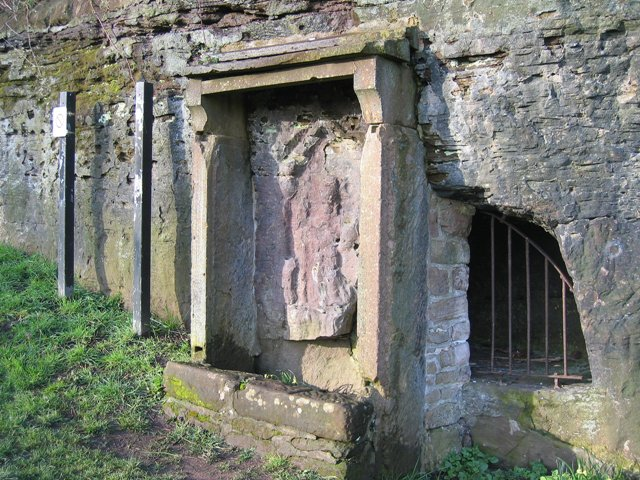
The Minerva Shrine

The Roman fortress of Deva was constructed from local sandstone, which was quarried across the river to the south of the fortress. Traces of the quarry are visible in Handbridge. In the 2nd century, a shrine to the Roman goddess Minerva was carved in the quarry for protection, perhaps by the quarry workers. Despite heavy weathering, the figure can be seen holding a spear and a shield with an owl above the left shoulder to symbolise wisdom. There is also a carving of an altar where offerings were left. The only rock-cut Roman shrine still in situ in Britain, the Minerva shrine is a Grade I listed building.

== Legionary baths ==
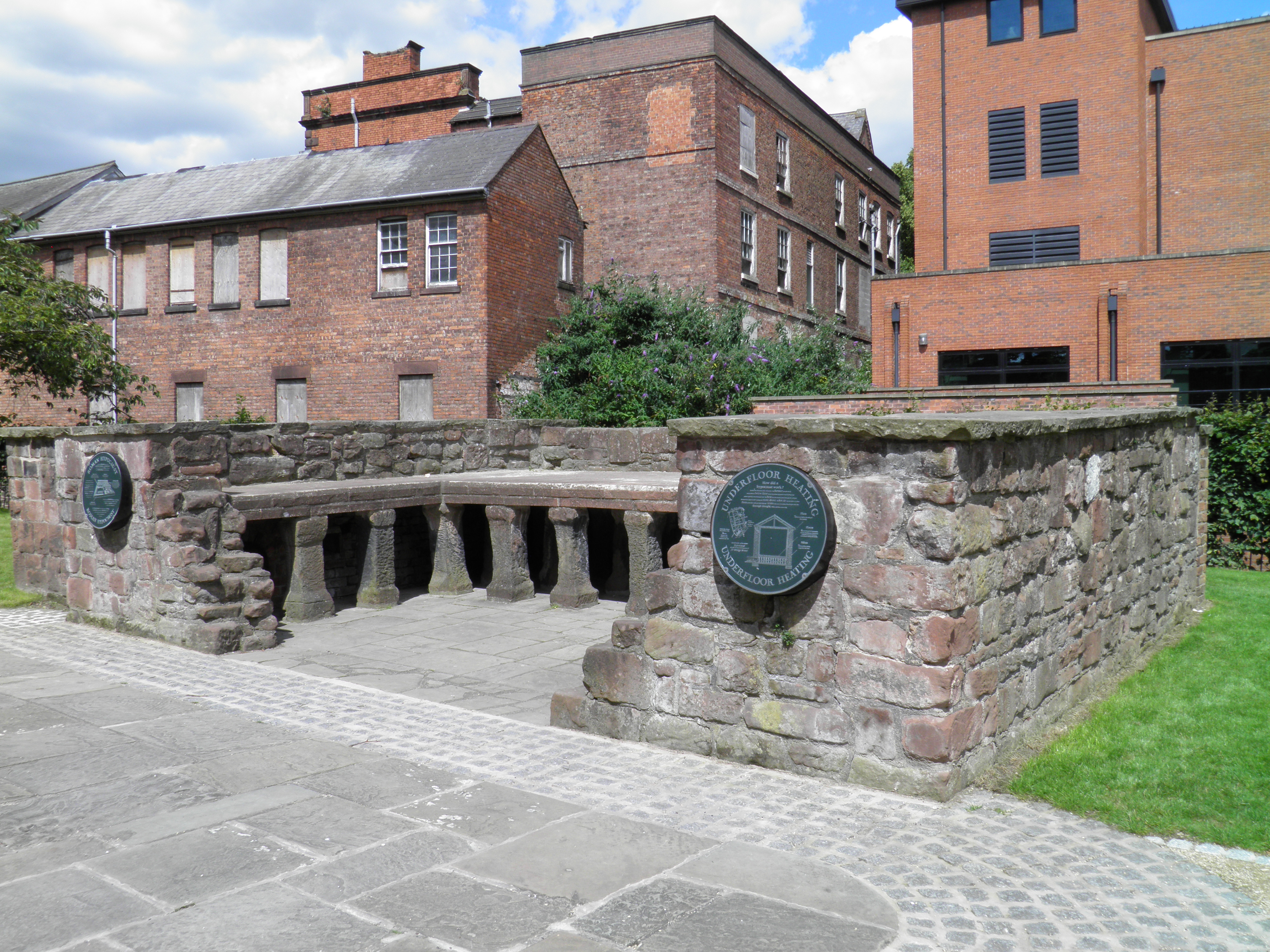
A reconstructed hypocaust under-floor heating system using recovered remains from the Legionary baths.

Deva Victrix had a large legionary bath complex (thermae) for the soldiers to maintain good hygiene and to use for leisure time. The baths were sited near the south gate and measured 82.6 metres (271 ft) by 85.5 metres (281 ft). They were completed towards the end of Vespasian's reign. The complex was constructed from concrete and faced with stone. The walls were 1.2 metres (3.9 ft) thick and the barrel-vaulted buildings rose as high as 16.1 metres (53 ft).

The bath complex featured an entrance room (vestibulum), an exercise hall (basilica thermarum), a sweating room (sudatorium), a cold room with a cold pool (frigidarium), a warm room (tepidarium), and a hot room with a hot plunge bath (caldarium). An unsheltered exercise yard (palaestra) also formed part of the complex. The baths had mosaic floors and were heated by a hypocaust under-floor system connected to three furnaces. Such furnaces required several metric tons of wood each day.

The baths would have been in operation 24 hours a day, using an estimated 850,000 litres (190,000 imp gal) of water each day. The water was supplied from the springs in Boughton through underground lead pipes linked to the main aqueduct near the east gate. The water was then held in large tanks with concrete foundations, before being fed through the complex.

A large area of the baths was destroyed by building works in 1863 and during the construction of the Grosvenor Shopping Mall in 1963. Sandstone columns from the exercise hall of the baths, measuring 0.75 metres (2.5 ft) in diameter, are present in the "Roman Gardens" off Pepper Street; the columns would originally have stood 5.9 metres (19 ft) high. A section of hypocaust remains in situ and is on display in the cellar of 39 Bridge Street.

== The Port ==
An essential part of the Roman supply lines to all its Britannia legionary fortresses was good access for sea-going ships. Deva needed reliable and regular supplies of foodstuffs, most notably grain and other supplies shipped directly from the Mediterranean area, Gaul, Spain and the Rhinelands. It also expected to have good access to the heavy and bulky raw materials needed to build and maintain a fortress, such as lead and copper from North Wales, and bricks, tiles and pottery from elsewhere in the province. The fortress served as a stepping-off point for military expeditions further north or west, in which ship transport was a key feature. A strategic advantage to siting the fortress here was that the River Dee was navigable and presumably had effective and convenient harbour facilities.

The longheld belief has been that the area west of the fortress was where the harbour lay. The western gate can only lead to the river, via a strip of higher ground to a larger area that is now reclaimed land known as the Roodee. The higher ground became part of the Roman civilian Canabae, and is enclosed within the Norman town walls. At the base of these are Roman stoneworks traditionally identified as the quay wall of the Roman harbour, thought to have stood beside an expanse of open navigable water which silted up in late- or post-Roman times. A 2002 re-interpretation suggests the wall was too high above sea-level to be a quay. The Roman stonework reaches to 11 metres OD, seven metres above the highest high tides, with all the appearance that this was not the top of these 2 metre wide masonry walls. Even a high-sided ship would be too far below the quay to unload easily. If these were not quay walls, could they have been defensive walls, enclosing the civilian settlement? If so, the harbour would need a different access. Evidence of Roman timber piles out on the Roodee had been found by Victorians building a gas works. Mason (2002) suggests these could have carried a pier the 300 metres across the mudflats, providing access to the deepwater river frontage to the west.

== Market Hall inscription ==
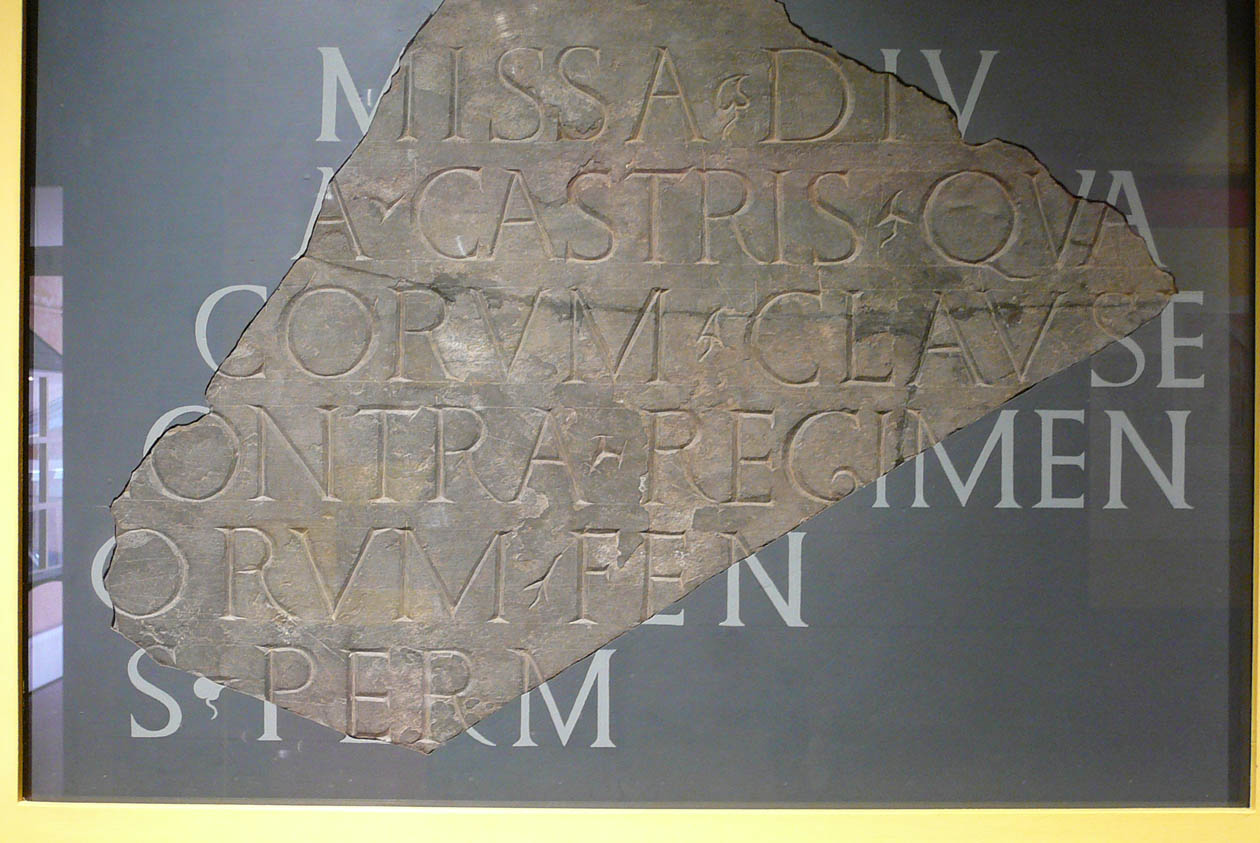
Fragment of the Market Hall inscription, from Fortress Deva

This is a fragment of a much larger inscription, finely carved onto Welsh slate, which was discovered close to the fort's principia. Archaeologist David J.P. Mason has said that:

... Inscriptions of this type are comparatively scarce ... it therefore seems likely to belong to the administrative class of inscription, generally written out in full ... which were set up as a public record of official decisions taken at the highest level of government.

Examples of important inscriptions of this nature include treaties with local tribes and declarations of rights. The text of this inscription cannot be reconstructed from this small fragment, but it appears to talk about the "fortress", an "amicable conclusion", and someone being "against the regime".

== Amphitheatre ==
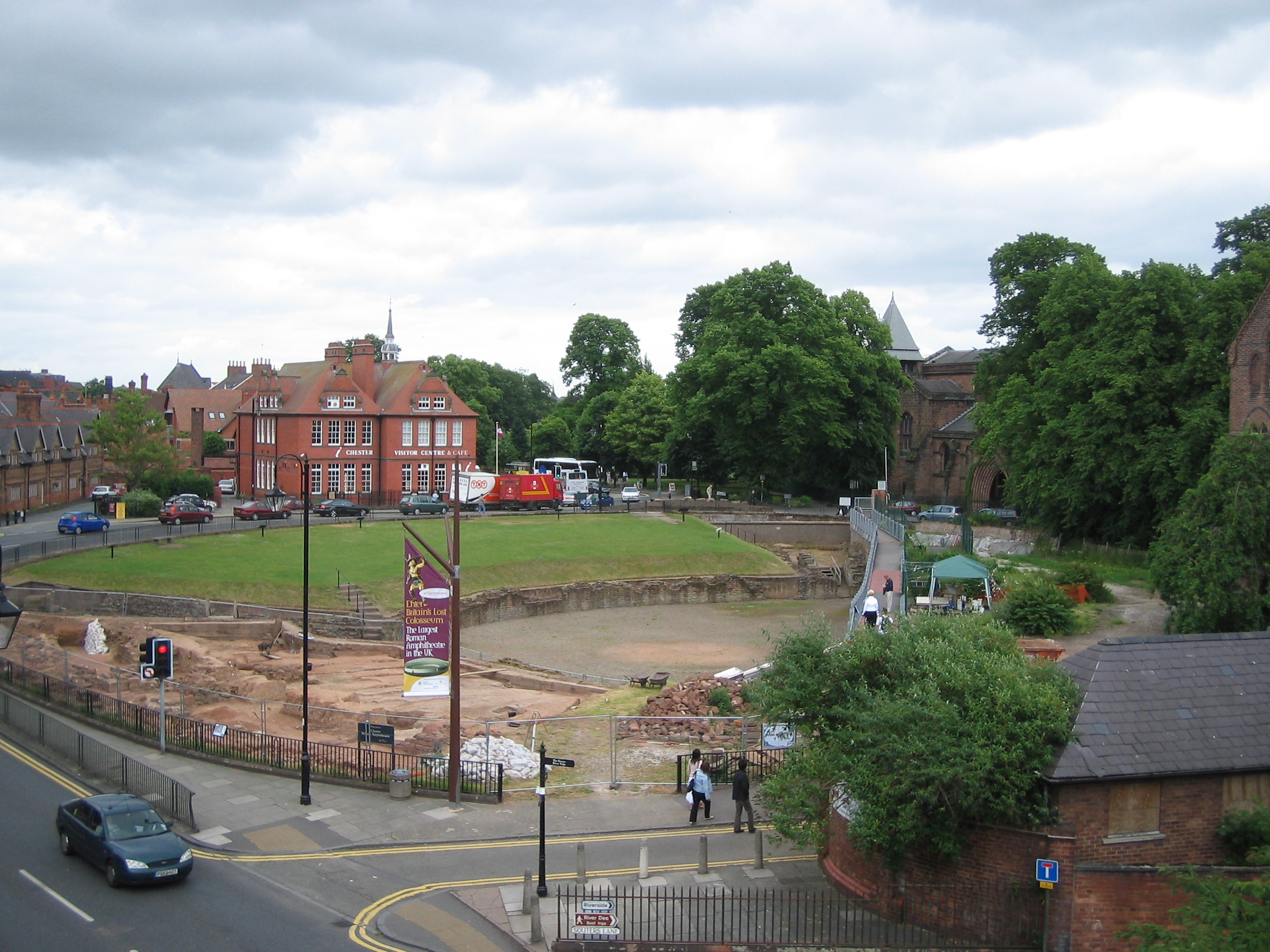
The amphitheatre seen from the city walls, with archaeological digs in progress (2006)

The amphitheatre was discovered in 1929, and the Chester Archaeological Society—with support from then Prime Minister Ramsay MacDonald—protected it from the construction of a road over the site. Excavations have revealed traces of late Iron Age cultivation, and they show that Deva's amphitheatre was built in two phases. The first amphitheatre was constructed from timber soon after the fortress and measured 75 by 67 metres (246 by 220 ft). There is no evidence of repairs to the timber structure, and its foundations were only 0.6 metres (2 ft) deep, so it may have been a temporary structure. In the Flavian period the amphitheatre was rebuilt in stone. This second phase was larger than the first and measured 95.7 by 87.2 metres (314 by 286 ft). Only the seating that was extended, not the arena itself. The latest excavations indicate that it was a two-tiered structure, capable of accommodating between 8,000 and 10,000 spectators. Its size has been used as an indicator of Deva's large civilian population, and of the presence of wealthy citizens. The second phase of building is the largest-known military amphitheatre in Britain. It is a protected as a Scheduled Ancient Monument.

The amphitheatre served a variety of purposes. As it was close to the fortress, it would have been used as a venue for weapons training as well as hosting spectacular entertainments involving acrobats, wrestlers, and professional gladiators. The walls of the amphitheatre were 0.9 metres (3 ft) thick and may have stood as high as 12 metres (39 ft). The buttresses were too insubstantial to be structural, so must have been decorative.

Part of a slate frieze depicting a retiarius, or net-fighter, was discovered in 1738, most likely dating to the 2nd century; it was probably used to decorate the tomb of a gladiator. Other finds included a small bronze statuette of a gladiator, parts of a Roman bowl depicting scenes from a gladiatorial contest, and part of a gladius sword handle. Much of the masonry from the amphitheatre was reused in the construction of the St John's Church and the monastery of St Mary.

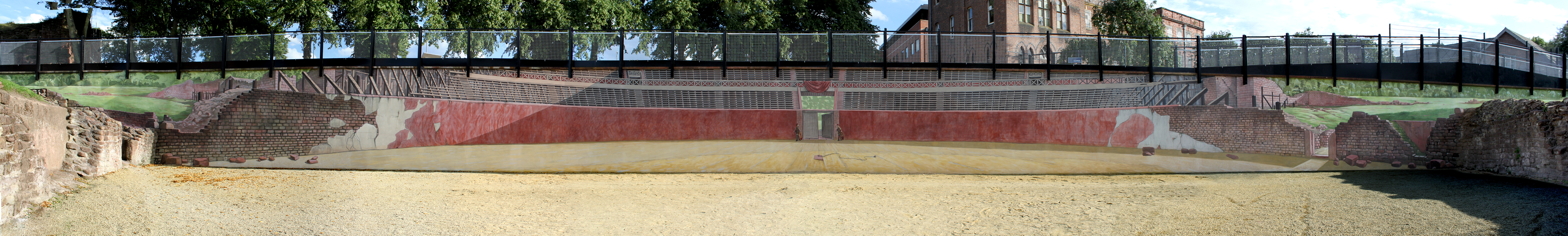
Chester's Amphitheatre Mural by Gary Drostle showing how the amphitheatre would have appeared in the Roman period

== Elliptical building ==
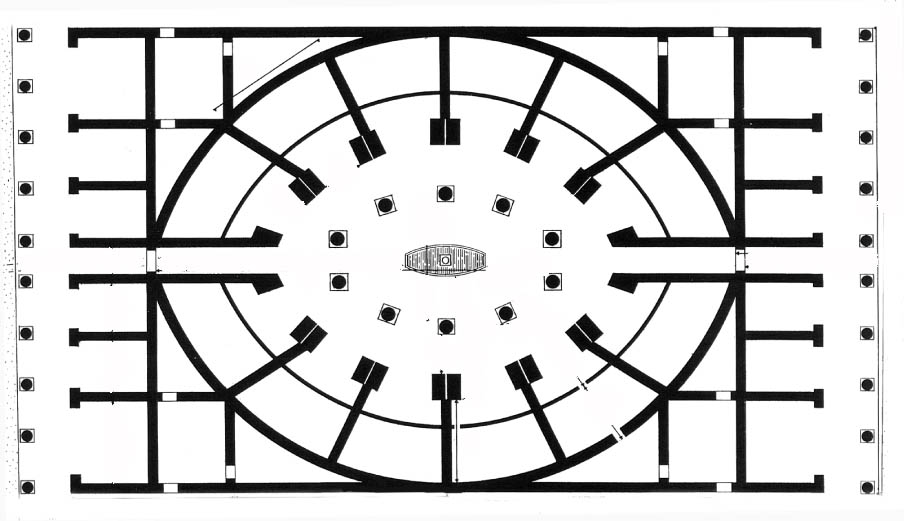
Outline of the first "elliptical" temple

In 1939, some paving and the walls of two unusual elliptical buildings were discovered, one atop the other. These "elliptical" buildings were partially uncovered behind Chester's market hall, and no similar buildings have been found in other legionary fortresses. The buildings were located near the centre of the fortress and they had their own bath buildings and a range of store rooms around the outside. The presence of a second bath building is unusual because legionary fortresses generally had just one set of internal baths. Construction on the site began around 77 AD and this was confirmed by a length of lead piping, which served a central water feature or fountain, which was stamped with the name of Emperor Vespasian. The first building was a prestigious edifice made with concrete foundations and finely dressed stonework, and was probably the finest building in the entire fortress. Technically speaking it was not elliptical, but arcuate, with the central hall being formed from two intersecting arcs, and this makes it unique in the Roman Empire. Its function is unknown. There was no seating within the arcs, which precludes a theatre, and the best guess of the archaeologists was that the twelve alcoves may have contained images of the gods, with the temple being dedicated to the twelve primary gods of the Roman pantheon. Or, alternatively, the oval shape may have represented the shape of the known Roman world, but there is no supporting evidence for this.

The completed building measured 52.4 metres (172 ft) by 31.45 metres (103.2 ft), and had an oval courtyard with a water feature at its centre, 14 metres (46 ft) by 9 metres (30 ft), surrounded by 12 "wedge-shaped" rooms. Traces of the concrete foundation for the water feature and its lead pipe work have been excavated. The 12 rooms surrounding the courtyard had large arched entrances, 4 metres (13 ft) wide and at least 5.5 metres (18 ft) high. It is not certain if the first building was ever completed, but it had certainly been destroyed by the 90s AD and the site was subsequently used as the fortress rubbish dump for many decades.

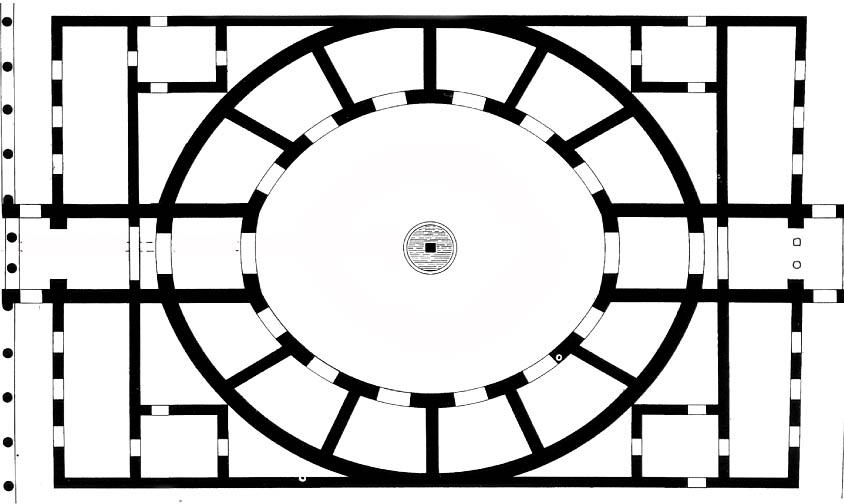
Outline of the second "elliptical" building

The second elliptical building was built on top foundations of the first, and although the architect must have been aware of the exact layout of the previous building, the design of the second was slightly modified. Although the it looks very similar to the first, it used different diameters of arc to achieve a slightly "fatter" design. The second "elliptical" building was not constructed until about 220 AD, and this was confirmed by a coin of Emperor Elagabalus under one of the pavement slabs. It is thought that the second building may have survived until the end of Roman rule and influence in Britain.

== Possible capital of Britannia ==
The elliptical building is one of several differences between the fortress at Chester and other Roman fortresses in the province. Another is the Large Courtyard Building that occupies a vast section of the north-central area of the fortress, that came to light in 1979-81. This is some 160 metres (520 ft) by 60 metres (200 ft) in size. The enormous stone building began construction at the same time as the first timber fortress was being built. However it was barely above ground level when work stopped for a decade or so. When work recommenced, the plans changed and numerous small rooms were built around its perimeter, and from then on it appears to have been a storage area. Its original, highly ambitious intentions remain a mystery. Deva was 20% larger, 5 hectares (12 acres), than the fortresses of Eboracum (York)—later capital of Britannia Inferior—and Isca Augusta (Caerleon). Also, the stone curtain wall at Chester was constructed without mortar, using large sandstone blocks; this required greater skill and effort than the methods used to build the walls of Eboracum and Isca Augusta, and was usually reserved for the most important structures such as temples or city walls rather than town walls. The presence of unusual buildings at the heart of the fortress—accounting for the 4 hectares (10 acres) by which Deva was larger than other fortresses—has been taken as evidence that their construction was specifically ordered by the provincial governor. The governor (Legatus Augusti pro praetore) when construction first started was Gnaeus Julius Agricola. Lead piping found in the elliptical building bears his name, the only evidence in Britain of a building under his direct control. These differences suggest that Deva may have been Agricola's administrative headquarters—in effect the capital of Britannia. This was speculated on in a Timewatch investigation.

Another factor pointing to Deva Victrix as a provincial capital is the presence of a port. From Deva, Ireland (Hibernia) was also accessible, a land which Agricola had plans to conquer. Also, the Flavian dynasty was expansionist, and Deva was closer to what would then have been the front, making administration quicker and easier. Furthermore, historian Vittorio Di Martino believes that Agricola could have chosen Deva Victrix as a possible future capital of Roman Britain because it was practically placed at the centre of the British isles, being located geographically at nearly the same distance from the westernmost shores of Ireland, the easternmost lands of Britannia and the Channel.

Regardless of the empire's plans for Deva, Londinium, the province's economic and trading centre, emerged as the capital of Britannia, reflecting a change in imperial policy from expansionism to consolidation.

== See also ==
- Chester city walls
- History of Chester
- Minerva's Shrine, Chester
- Via Devana
