= Chloe Lloyd =

English fashion model

- Born: Chloe Lloyd; 2 October 1992 (age 34); Crewe, Cheshire, England
- Occupation: Fashion model
- Years active: 2010–present
- Spouse: Josh Lloyd-Cuthbert (m. 2018)
- Modeling information
- Height: 5 ft 8.5 in (174.0 cm)
- Hair color: Blonde
- Eye color: Blue
- Agency: Two Management (Los Angeles); Elite Models (Miami and New York); Unique Models (Denmark); Iconic Management (Hamburg)
- Website: http://www.chloelloyd.co.uk/

Chloe Lloyd (born 2 October 1992) is an English fashion model. In 2015, she appeared on the magazine covers of Elle Portugal and Norway.

== Early life ==
She was born to parents Robert and Melanie Lloyd on 2 October 1992 in Cheshire, England. She studied performing arts at South Cheshire College.

== Career ==
In 2010, at the age of 17, she won the title of Face of Bank after beating thousands of models in the bid to be the face of high street store's campaign. Soon after she got a modeling contract in 2011. Lloyd is represented by The Squad Management. Throughout the years, she has also modelled for magazines such as Cosmopolitan, Brides, Marie Claire, Glamour, and Vogue. In 2012, she was featured in the music video for The Wanted's song, "I Found You". In 2014/15, she modelled for NewYorker, Maybelline, Rubber B, The Body Shop, and Schwarzkopf. She has also been in campaigns for Thomas Sabo. She was on the cover of Elle Portugal in June 2015 and Elle Norway in October 2015.

== Personal life ==
Lloyd-Cuthbert has been in a relationship with Union J member Josh Cuthbert since late 2014. The two currently live together in London. On 14 November 2015 the couple announced that Cuthbert proposed to Lloyd whilst on holiday in Venice. On 9 August 2018, Lloyd and Cuthbert married at a private wedding in Aynhoe Park.
