= Minerva's Shrine, Chester =

Minerva's Shrine
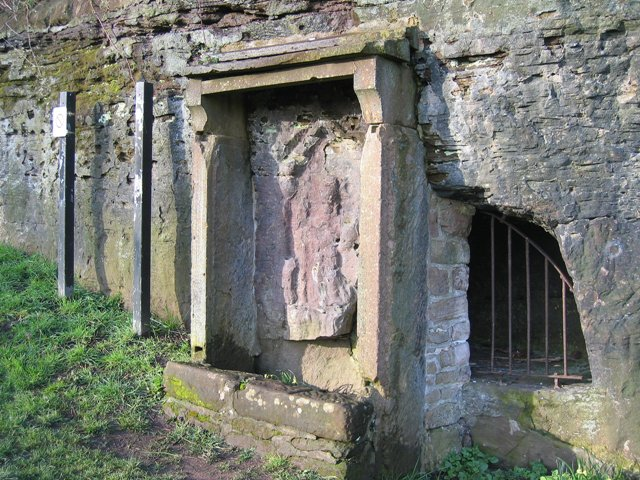
- Minerva's Shrine

- Location in Cheshire
- 53.1843°N 2.8893°W
- Location: Edgar's Field, Handbridge, Chester, England
- OS grid reference: SJ 406 656

History
- Built: 2nd century

Listed Building – Grade I
- Designated: 28 July 1955
- Reference no.: 1375783

Minerva's Shrine is a Roman shrine dedicated to the goddess Minerva, located in Edgar's Field, Handbridge, Chester, England. It is recorded in the National Heritage List for England as a Grade I listed building.

The shrine dates from the early 2nd century and is carved into the face of a sandstone quarry. It is considered the only monument of its type in western Europe that remains in its original location. The carving is protected by a 19th-century stone surround with a hood, refurbished in the late 20th century. Over time, the figure has weathered and has suffered damage from human activity. Adjacent to the shrine is an opening in the rock face, possibly a natural fissure later enlarged, known as Edgar's Cave.

The shrine stands beside the route of the former main Roman road leading into the fortress of Deva Victrix from the south. In Roman religion, Minerva was associated with war, wisdom and craftsmanship. She is commonly depicted with a helmet, shield, breastplate and spear; in this carving, however, she appears in simplified form, standing within a representation of a temple.

The Roman quarry, together with Edgar's Field and the rock-cut figure of Minerva, is designated as a Scheduled monument.

A cast of the shrine is held in the Grosvenor Museum, Chester.

== See also ==
- List of Scheduled Monuments in Cheshire dated to before 1066
- Grade I listed buildings in Cheshire West and Chester
