= Queen's Park High School =

- Views of the school

Location
- Queen's Park; Chester, Cheshire, CH4 7AE; England; 53.18437°N 2.88578°W

Information
- Type: Academy
- Motto: Inspiring Individuals, Empowering Minds, Defining Futures
- Established: 1892; 134 years ago
- Local authority: Cheshire West and Chester
- Trust: The Learning Trust
- Department for Education URN: 143817 Tables
- Ofsted: Reports
- Head teacher: Tom Kearns
- Gender: Co-educational
- Age: 11 to 18
- Enrolment: 526
- Colours: Blue and white
- Publication: Newsletter
- Website: www.qphs.co.uk

Queen's Park High School (QPHS) is a co-educational secondary school and sixth form located in Queens Park, Chester, England. The school’s emblem is a heraldic lion, which features on the uniform.

== History ==
Although the name Queen's Park High School dates from 1971, the institution traces its origins to 1892, making it one of the oldest non-independent schools in Chester.

=== Boys' school ===
Chester City Grammar School for Boys developed from a technical day school established at the Grosvenor Museum in 1892. Following the Education Act 1902, the school was reorganised and renamed the City and County School for Boys in June 1907. It transferred to Chester Corporation in August 1908, remaining at the Grosvenor Museum until 1912, when it moved to purpose-built premises in Queen's Park.

In 1938, the school was renamed Chester City Grammar School for Boys. New premises were opened in Queen's Park in 1941. Under local authority reorganisation in the late 1960s, the school merged with Chester City High School for Girls. The combined institution became Queen's Park High School, with full amalgamation completed in September 1971.

=== Girls' school ===
Chester City High School for Girls was established following the Education Act 1902. It opened on 23 January 1905 in temporary accommodation at the Race Stands on the Roodee. In 1912, the school moved to new premises in Queen's Park.

Originally known as the City and County School for Girls, the school was renamed Chester City High School for Girls in 1938. Under reorganisation proposals prepared in 1968, the school merged with Chester City Grammar School for Boys to form a mixed secondary school. The headmaster of the new school was appointed in 1970, and full integration was completed in July 1971.

== Notable former pupils ==
=== Chester City Grammar School ===
- Russ Abbot, comedian
- Stephen Byers, Labour MP
- Sir John Enderby
- John Golding, Labour MP
- Bob Mills, comedian and writer

== See also ==
- The Queen's School, Chester
