= Cheshire College – South & West =

English vocational college

Cheshire College – South & West (South Spesh) is a post-16 further education and vocational college in Cheshire, England, formed in 2017 by the merger of West Cheshire College and South Cheshire College. Its main campus is in Crewe (60%), with other sites in Ellesmere Port (28%) and Chester (12%). The principal is Jasbir Dhesi. In November 2019, there were 3,800 students in the 16–18 age range, together with 5,500 adult learners, mainly taking part-time or short courses, and 876 apprentices. In 2019, there were 243 full-time equivalent teachers.

It was rated "Good" overall by Ofsted in December 2019, although "Provision for learners with high needs" was assessed as "Requires improvement". The college ran at a before-tax deficit in 2017–18 (£569,000) and 2018–19 (£1.18 million).

== History ==
Cheshire College – South & West was formed on 31 March 2017 by the merger of West Cheshire College into South Cheshire College. The merger plans initially also involved Mid Cheshire College, which merged instead in August 2017 with Warrington Collegiate to form Warrington and Vale Royal College. At the date of merger it had 11,000 students as well as 1300 apprentices. The name changed to the present one on 1 January 2018.

In March 2026 it was announced that Cheshire College – South & West and Macclesfield College planned to merge.

Cheshire College – South & West merged with Macclesfield College to form Stronger Together on 3 August 2026.
