= Chester Shot Tower =

Shot tower in Chester, England

Coordinates: 53°11′39″N 2°52′42″W

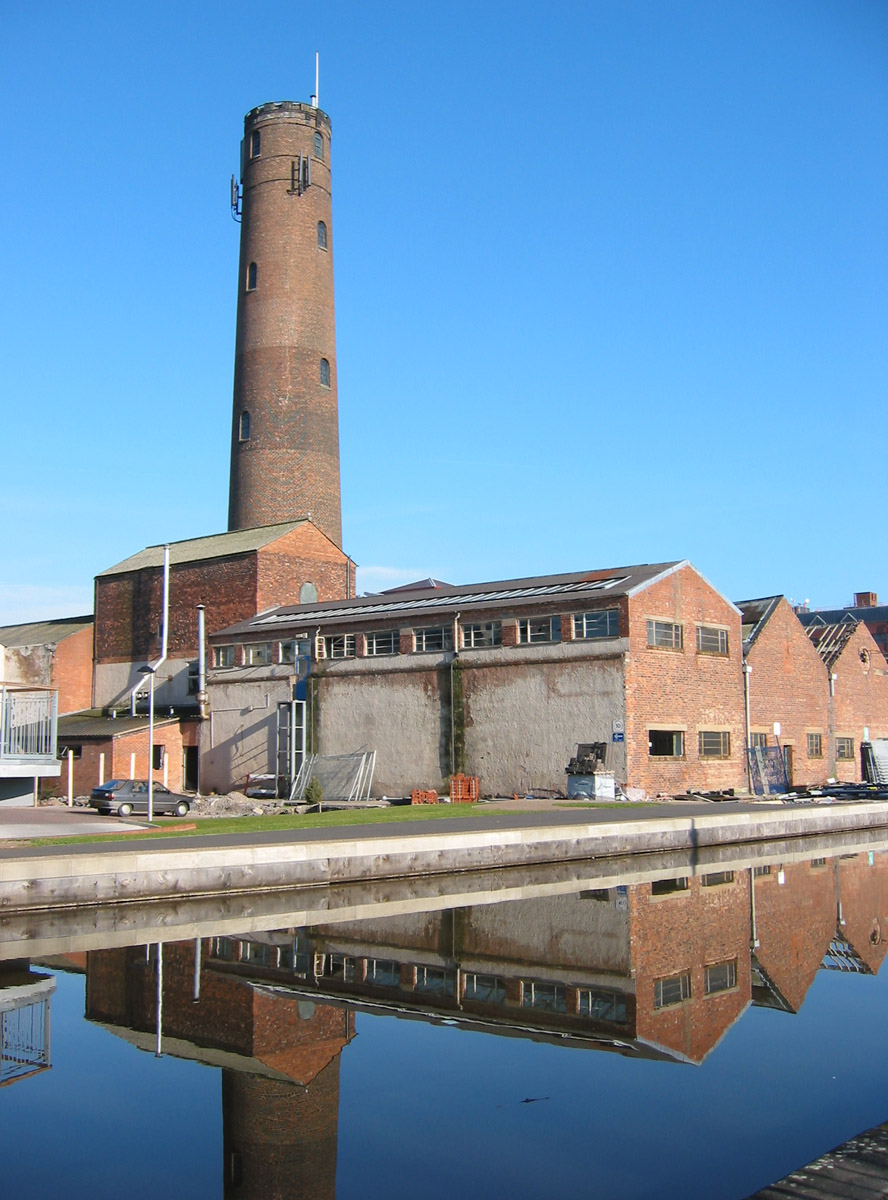
Chester Shot Tower

Chester Shot Tower, also known as Boughton Shot Tower, is a grade-II*-listed shot tower located at SJ413667 in the Boughton district of Chester, England. The tower stands beside the Shropshire Union Canal and forms part of the disused Chester Leadworks. Built by Walkers, Parker & Co. in 1799, the tower is the oldest of three remaining shot towers in the UK, and probably the oldest such structure still standing in the world.

The circular red-brick tower is 168 feet (51 m) tall and 30 feet (9.1 m) in diameter at the base tapering to 20 feet (6.1 m) at the top, with small arched windows. A lift shaft dating from 1971 was removed in 2020; the interior retains a spiral staircase and melting pots.

== Drop process of lead shot manufacture ==
The tower was one of the earliest built to manufacture lead shot using the method pioneered in the 1780s by the Bristol inventor William Watts. Molten lead was poured through a pierced copper plate or sieve at the top of the tower, with the droplets forming perfect spheres by surface tension during the fall; the spherical drops were then cooled in a vat of water at the base. Watts' process was less labour-intensive than the earlier method of casting shot in moulds. An early use of the tower was to make lead shot for muskets in the Napoleonic Wars. Although other methods were developed to manufacture shot during the 20th century, the Chester tower was still in use as late as 2001.

== Lead industry in Chester ==
Lead is believed to have been exported at the port of Chester from lead mines in north-east Wales since the Roman period; later sites included Minera Lead Mines. The construction of the Chester Canal in the 1770s led to industrial development to the east of Chester, with the Walkers, Parker & Co. leadworks being established there in the late 18th century. The lead industry became one of Chester's major industries during the 19th century. An archaeological investigation carried out in 2001 found evidence of numerous demolished buildings contemporary with the shot tower of 1799; by 1812, the leadworks is known to have also included pipe-drawing machines and a rolling mill for producing lead sheet. When the partnership was dissolved in 1881, the lead business of Walkers, Parker & Co was listed for sale by auction in 1884 eventually converting to a limited company – the auction listing reveals that the entire Chester site covered 21 acres, however part of this was a detached mansion with pleasure gardens (5 acres), and two enclosure of land on the East side comprising 12 acres, leaving 4 acres for the works themselves. The catalogue of buildings and machinery reveals a wide variety of lead related products, paint, pipes, shot, sheet, casting and acid-house. Connections to the railways and the canal, and the associated railway trucks, canal barges, horses, etc.

The leadworks closed in 2001, with Calder relocating to west Chester. Most of the remaining buildings of the leadworks, with the exception of the shot tower, were demolished around 2004 to make way for urban regeneration of the canal-side area. A small park by the canal on part of the former site was opened in May 2006. The park contains a sculpture in stainless steel and blue glass which commemorates Chester's lead industry; 'Spheres of Reflection' by Edd Snell was inspired by lead drops impacting on the surface of water.

== Redevelopment plans ==
In April 2012 Broadway Malyan submitted plans for a £6.4 million redevelopment of the Shot Tower and associated leadworks to create 53 residential units as well as leisure and retail facilities. The controversy over the plans featured in the February 2013 BBC2 TV documentary The Planners.

== Other shot towers ==
The Chester Shot Tower is one of only three such structures to remain in the UK. Although shot towers were common during the 19th century across the country (two appear in the London skyline in John Constable's 1832 painting The Opening of Waterloo Bridge), the Chester tower is the only surviving example that dates from the 18th or 19th century. The two shot towers that appear in Constable's painting were both owned by Walker, Parker & Co though neither were originally built for them. The old tower, was originally built in 1782/3 by Messrs Watts (who developed the process and built the first tower in Bristol in 1782) and was 160 feet high, it suffered a serious fire in January 1826 though it was rebuilt the same year, and the newer Lambeth shot tower was also built in 1826 for Maltby and later taken over by Walker, Parker & Co. Another Walker, Parker & Co shot tower was the 157-foot tower at Elswick in Newcastle-on-Tyne which was completed in 1797, operated until 1951, and demolished c.1968. Other early shot towers include the Jackson Ferry Shot Tower (c.1807), an example of a stone shot tower in Wythe County, Virginia, and the brick Sparks Shot Tower in Philadelphia, Pennsylvania (1808), both in the US.

The other British examples still standing date from the 20th century. The Cheese Lane Shot Tower in Bristol, a reinforced concrete tower, was constructed in 1969 to replace Watts' original shot tower in Redcliffe, which was demolished in 1968. A military look-out post in Tynemouth dating from 1916 is also believed to have doubled as a shot tower. The so-called Crane Park Shot Tower at Twickenham is no longer thought to have been used for this purpose.
