= List of schools in Cheshire West and Chester =

This is a list of schools in Cheshire West and Chester, a unitary authority in Cheshire, England.

== State-funded schools ==
=== Primary schools ===
- The Acorns Primary and Nursery School, Ellesmere Port
- Acresfield Academy, Upton-by-Chester
- Alvanley and Manley Village School, Alvanley
- Antrobus St Mark's CE Primary School, Antrobus
- The Arches Community Primary School, Blacon
- Aston by Sutton Primary School Aston-by-Sutton
- Barnton Community Nursery and Primary School, Barnton
- Barrow CE Primary School, Barrow
- Belgrave Primary School, Westminster Park
- Bishop Wilson CE Primary School, Burton
- Boughton Heath Academy, Great Boughton
- Brookside Primary School, Great Sutton
- Byley Primary School and Nursery, Byley
- Cambridge Road Community Primary and Nursery School, Ellesmere Port
- Capenhurst CE Primary School, Capenhurst
- Charles Darwin Community Primary School, Northwich
- Cherry Grove Primary School, Chester
- Chester Blue Coat CE Primary School, Chester
- Childer Thornton Primary School, Childer Thornton
- Christleton Primary School, Christleton
- Clutton CE Primary School, Clutton
- Comberbach Nursery and Primary School, Comberbach
- Crowton Christ Church CE Primary School, Crowton
- Cuddington Primary School, Cuddington
- Darnhall Primary School, Darnhall
- Davenham CE Primary School, Davenham
- Dee Point Primary School, Blacon
- Delamere CE Primary Academy, Kelsall
- Dodleston CE Primary School, Dodleston
- Duddon St Peter's CE Primary School, Duddon
- Eaton Primary School, Eaton
- Eccleston CE Primary School, Eccleston
- Ellesmere Port Christ Church CE Primary School, Ellesmere Port
- Elton Primary School, Elton
- Farndon Primary School, Farndon
- Frodsham CE Primary School, Frodsham
- Frodsham Manor House Primary School, Frodsham
- Frodsham Primary Academy, Frodsham
- Grange Community Nursery and Primary School, Winsford
- Great Budworth CE Primary School, Great Budworth
- The Grosvenor Park CE Academy, Chester
- Guilden Sutton CE Primary School, Guilden Sutton
- Hartford Manor Primary School & Nursery, Hartford
- Hartford Primary School, Hartford
- Helsby Hillside Primary School, Helsby
- Highfield Community Primary School, Blacon
- Hoole CE Primary School, Hoole
- Horn's Mill Primary School, Helsby
- Huntington Community Primary School, Huntington
- Huxley CE Primary School, Huxley
- JH Godwin Primary School, Blacon
- Kelsall Primary and Nursery School, Kelsall
- Kingsley Community Primary School and Nursery, Kingsley
- Kingsley St John's CE Primary School, Kingsley
- Kingsmead Primary School, Kingsmead
- Lache Primary School, Lache
- Leftwich Community Primary School, Leftwich
- Little Leigh Primary School, Little Leigh
- Little Sutton CE Primary School, Little Sutton
- Lostock Gralam CE Primary School, Lostock Gralam
- Lower Peover CE Primary School, Lower Peover
- Malpas Alport Endowed Primary School, Malpas
- Meadow Community Primary School, Great Sutton
- Mickle Trafford Village School, Mickle Trafford
- Mill View Primary School, Upton-by-Chester
- Moulton School, Moulton
- Neston Primary School, Little Neston
- Newton Primary School, Newton
- Norley CE Primary School, Norley
- The Oak View Academy, Over
- The Oaks Community Primary School, Ellesmere Port
- Oldfield Primary School, Vicars Cross
- Our Lady Star of the Sea RC Primary School, Ellesmere Port
- Over Hall Community School, Winsford
- Over St John's CE Primary School, Winsford
- Overleigh St Mary's CE Primary School, Handbridge
- Parkgate Primary School, Parkgate
- Parklands Community Primary School, Little Sutton
- Rivacre Valley Primary School, Overpool
- Rossmore School, Little Sutton
- Rudheath Primary Academy and Nursery, Rudheath
- Saighton CE Primary School & Pre-School, Saighton
- St Bede's RC Primary School, Weaverham
- St Bernard's RC Primary School, Ellesmere Port
- St Chad's CE Primary and Nursery School, Winsford
- St Clare's RC Primary School, Lache
- St Joseph's RC Primary School, Winsford
- St Luke's RC Primary School, Frodsham
- St Martin's Academy, Chester
- St Mary of the Angels RC Primary School, Little Sutton
- St Oswald's CE Primary School, Mollington
- St Saviour's RC Primary and Nursery School, Great Sutton
- St Theresa's RC Primary School, Blacon
- St Werburgh's and St Columba's RC Primary School, Hoole
- St Wilfrid's RC Primary School, Hartford
- St Winefride's RC Primary School, Little Neston
- Sandiway Primary School, Sandiway
- Saughall All Saints CE Primary School, Saughall
- Shocklach Oviatt CE Primary School, Shocklach
- Sutton Green Primary School, Little Sutton
- Tarporley CE Primary School, Tarporley
- Tarvin Primary School, Tarvin
- Tattenhall Park Primary School, Tattenhall
- Tilston Parochial CE Primary School, Tilston
- Tushingham-with-Grindley CE Primary School, Tushingham
- Upton Heath CE Primary School, Upton-by-Chester
- Upton Westlea Primary School, Upton-by-Chester
- Victoria Road Primary School, Northwich
- Waverton Community Primary School, Waverton
- Weaverham Forest Primary School, Weaverham
- Weaverham Primary Academy, Weaverham
- Westminster Community Primary School, Ellesmere Port
- Wharton CE Primary School, Wharton
- Whitby Heath Primary School, Ellesmere Port
- Whitegate CE Primary School, Whitegate
- Whitley Village School, Lower Whitley
- Willaston CE Primary School, Willaston
- William Stockton Community Primary School, Ellesmere Port
- Willow Wood Community Nursery & Primary School, Wharton
- Wimboldsley Community Primary School, Wimboldsley
- Wincham Community Primary School, Wincham
- Winnington Park Community Primary and Nursery School, Winnington
- Winsford High Street Community Primary School, Winsford
- Witton Church Walk CE Primary School, Northwich
- Wolverham Primary and Nursery School, Ellesmere Port
- Woodfall Primary School, Little Neston
- Woodlands Primary School, Ellesmere Port

=== Secondary schools ===
- Bishop Heber High School, Malpas
- Bishops' Blue Coat Church of England High School, Great Boughton
- Blacon High School, Blacon
- Chester Catholic High School, Chester
- Chester International School, Chester
- Christleton High School, Christleton
- The County High School, Leftwich
- Ellesmere Port Catholic High School, Ellesmere Port
- Ellesmere Port Church of England College, Ellesmere Port
- Hartford Church of England High School, Hartford
- Helsby High School, Helsby
- Neston High School, Neston
- Queen's Park High School, Handbridge
- Rudheath Senior Academy, Rudheath
- St Nicholas Catholic High School, Hartford
- Tarporley High School, Tarporley
- Upton-by-Chester High School, Upton-by-Chester
- Weaverham High School, Weaverham
- The Whitby High School, Ellesmere Port
- The Winsford Academy, Winsford

=== Special and alternative schools ===
- Ancora House School, Chester
- Archers Brook SEMH Residential School, Great Sutton
- The Bridge Short Stay School, Ellesmere Port
- Cloughwood Academy, Hartford
- Dee Banks School, Chester
- Dorin Park School, Upton-by-Chester
- Greenbank School, Hartford
- Hebden Green Community School, Winsford
- Hinderton School, Ellesmere Port
- Oaklands School, Winsford
- Rosebank School, Barnton
- The Russett School, Weaverham

=== Further education ===
- Mid Cheshire College, now merged into Warrington and Vale Royal College
- Sir John Deane's College
- Cheshire College – South & West

== Independent schools ==
=== Primary and preparatory schools ===
- The Firs School, Chester

=== Senior and all-through schools ===
- Abbey Gate College, Saighton
- Cransley School, Great Budworth
- The Grange School, Hartford
- The Hammond, Chester
- The King's School, Chester
- OneSchool Global UK, Hartford
- The Queen's School, Chester

=== Special and alternative schools ===
- Abbey School for Exceptional Children, Chester
- iMap Centre, Barrow
- Jefferson House, Darnhall
- Maple Grove School, Chester
