= Bache, Cheshire =

Suburb of Chester, Cheshire, England

Coordinates: 53.207°N 2.896°W

Bache
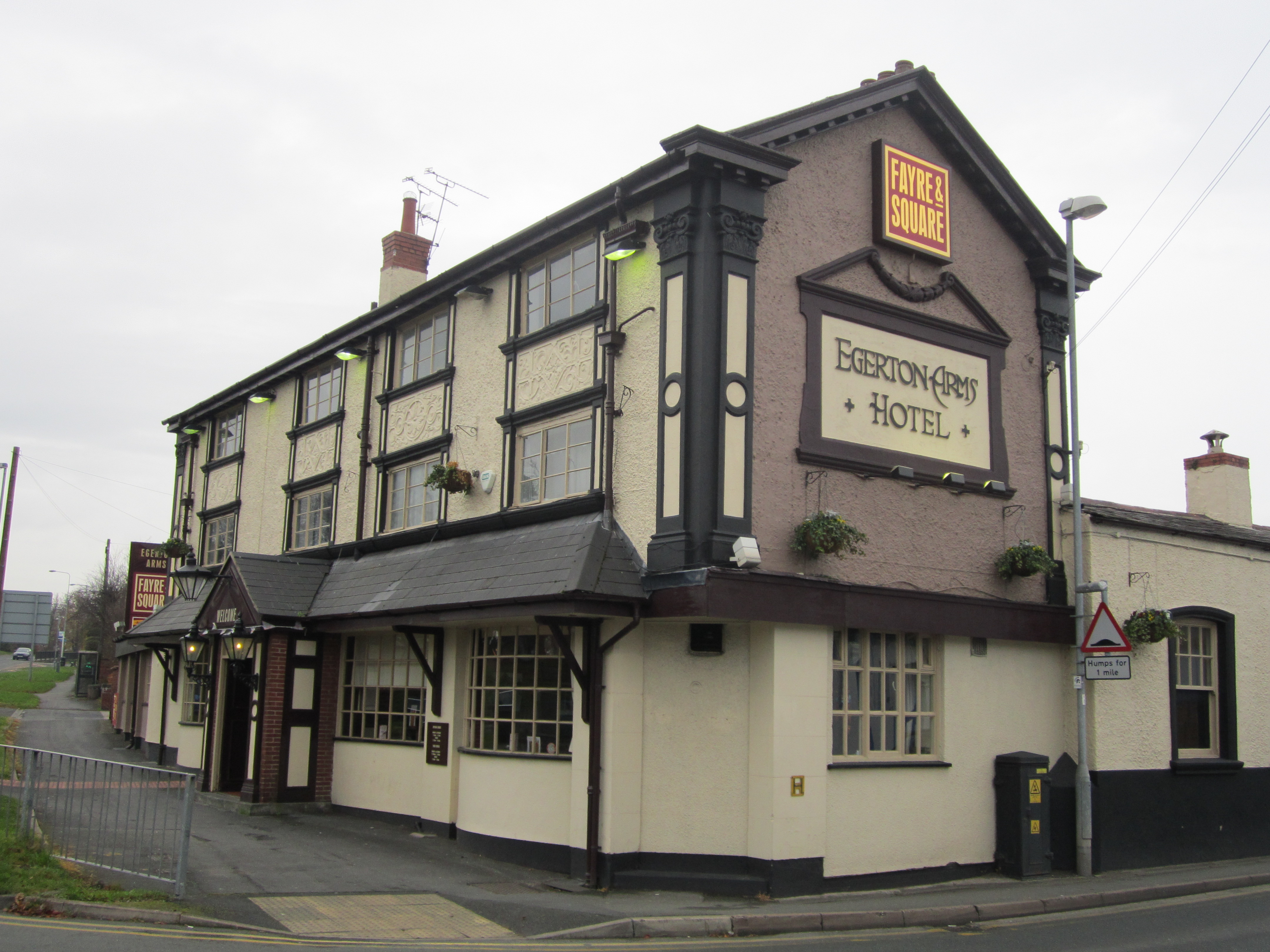
- The Egerton Arms Hotel, Bache

- Location within Cheshire
- Population: 307 (2011 census)
- OS grid reference: SJ402681
- Civil parish: Bache
- Unitary authority: Cheshire West and Chester
- Ceremonial county: Cheshire
- Region: North West
- Country: England
- Sovereign state: United Kingdom
- Post town: CHESTER
- Postcode district: CH2
- Dialling code: 01244
- Police: Cheshire
- Fire: Cheshire
- Ambulance: North West
- UK Parliament: Chester North and Neston

Bache (/ˈbeɪtʃ/, baytch) is a small civil parish and suburb of Chester, in the unitary authority of Cheshire West and Chester and the ceremonial county of Cheshire, England. Located to the north of the city, Bache combines with Moston and Upton-by-Chester to form a joint parish council.

== History ==
The name "Bache" comes from a large tidal lagoon that was once linked to the River Dee at Blacon. The area, which now lies under Liverpool Road and a supermarket car park, was slowly reclaimed and raised when the course of the river was diverted in the 1730s. The Chester Canal also cut off the watercourse in the 1780s. Its course can be traced from Bache Brook which is now partially covered by the Deva Link, a highways relief road.

Bache Hall, a large 18th-century building, was once the main house of the Bache estate. It occupied the land now part of the Countess of Chester Hospital. The building is currently used by the University of Chester. In the early 1900s, Bache Golf Club occupied land to the west of the hall.

Further details regarding the area's history can be found here.

The settlement had previously been a township in Chester St Oswald Parish, within the Broxton Hundred. It became a civil parish in 1866.

== Demography ==
The population of Bache was recorded at only 8 in 1801, rising to 25 in 1851, 36 in 1901 and 68 in 1951.

According to the 2001 census, the parish population had increased to 158 (where 69% lived in households and 31% resided in communal establishments). By the 2011 census the population had increased to 307 (80.1% lived in households and 19.9% lived in communal establishments). A significant area of the parish is occupied by the Countess of Chester Hospital, which is a communal institution.

== Transport ==
Bache railway station is on the Wirral line of the Merseyrail network, with services running between Chester and Liverpool. It is adjacent to a Morrison's supermarket and accessible from Mill Lane. The station opened in January 1984, replacing Upton-by-Chester railway station which was located further north.

The A5116 Liverpool Road passes through the area and marks the eastern boundary of the civil parish. Constructed in the early 1990s, the A5480 Countess Way connects the A5116 with the A540 road near Blacon.
