= Chester and Wrexham Turnpike =

Former turnpike road in Britain

The last turnpike road between Chester and Wrexham in the United Kingdom was built in 1752 and follows the same route as the A483 road leaving Chester and thereafter the B5445 towards Wrexham.

== History ==
A toll road between Chester and Wrexham was in place before 1315 because King Edward III decreed that a toll road that led to Wrexham through the Lache was part of the boundary of the City of Chester.

The last turnpike road between Chester and Wrexham was constructed in 1756, when the Shrewsbury and Wrexham Turnpike Trust extended its road to Chester having been given authority under the Shrewsbury and Wrexham Road Act 1751 (25 Geo. 2. c. 22). The turnpike road leaves Chester following the same route as the contemporary A483, and then along the B5445 towards Wrexham. The road crossed the River Alyn near to the Rossett watermill, then up the hill to the village of Marford. It entered Wrexham next to the Acton Smithy, Acton where there was a toll booth. At that location, it intersected with the Acton to Plas Coch, Broughton turnpike road, which was directly opposite to the Acton Smithy. It then passed by a further toll booth which is now known as the junction between Chester Road and Box Lane just prior to entering the town centre .

== Management ==
In 1752, the Shrewsbury to Wrexham Turnpike Trust was formed to create and manage a toll road between the two towns. It was the first turnpike trust to become involved in the management of roads in Wales. In 1756, the trust extended its road from Wrexham to Chester. In 1828, the Chester and Wrexham Turnpike Trust was established to take over the management of the Shrewsbury to Chester turnpike road on the section between Wrexham and Chester.

== Traffic ==
The Chester to Wrexham turnpike was the second busiest road that led out of Chester. It was because it was less effected by canal construction than other roads because of the gradient of the Gresford Bank. It gave the transporters on the route a monopoly on carrying goods between the two towns. In 1827 to 1828 it was estimated the road was used by 39,312 scheduled carriages, 11,395 private carriages, and 6,267 people on foot or horseback. Additionally, scheduled freight carriages transported 17,160 tonnes of goods and 13,150 tonnes was carried privately.

== Abolition ==
The Annual Turnpike Acts Continuance Act 1872 specified that the legislation to maintain the Chester to Wrexham turnpike road would expire no later than 1 November 1877. Therefore, it was disturnpiked in 1877. In December 1877, when the Wrexham District Highway Board had taken over responsibility for the road it mentioned it was in a poor condition and required much work to rectify it.
