= Chapel at the Countess of Chester Hospital =

Church in Upton-by-Chester, Cheshire, England

Coordinates: 53.21085°N 2.90051°W

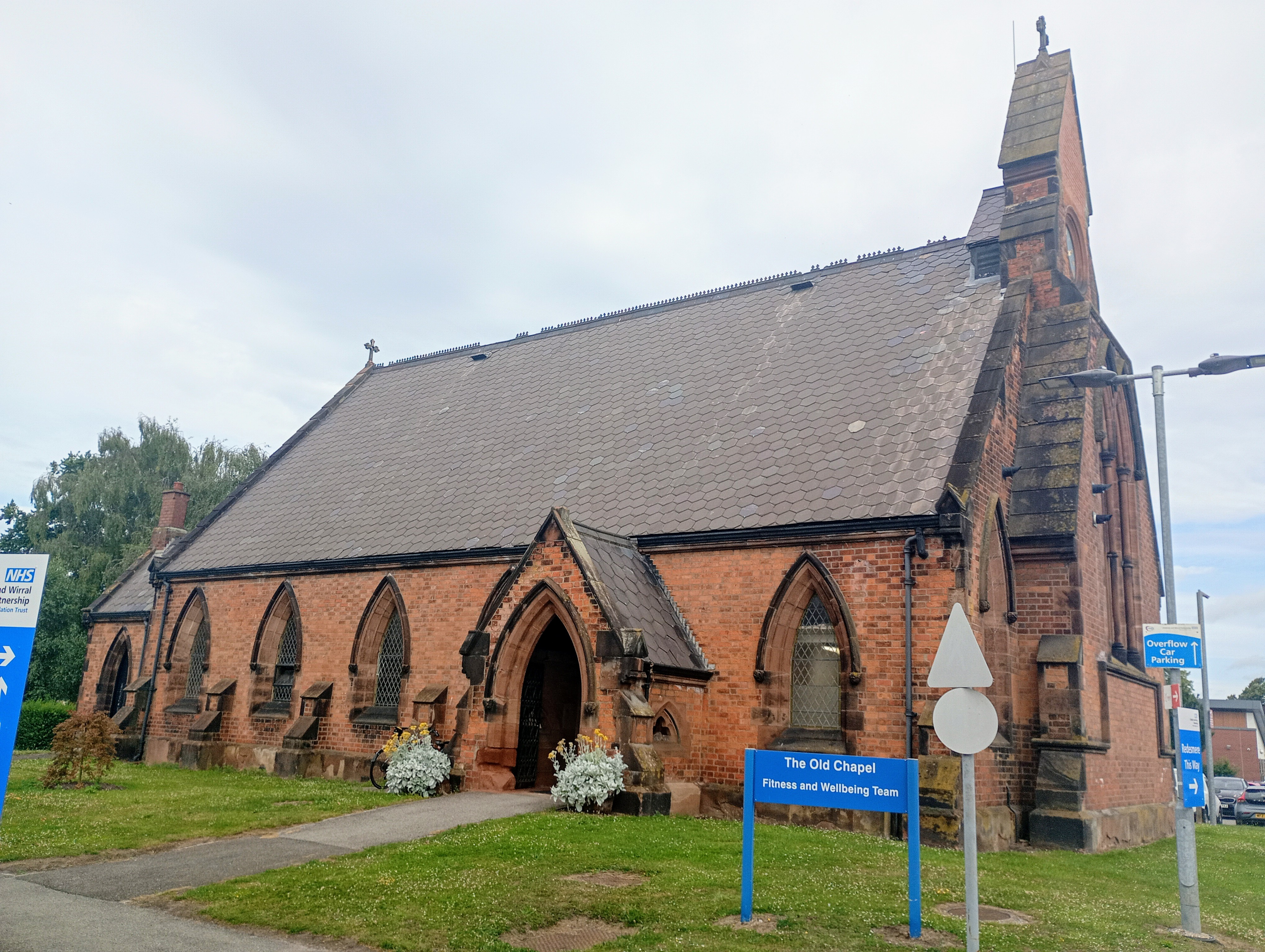
Chapel at the Countess of Chester Hospital

The Chapel at the Countess of Chester Hospital is located in Upton-by-Chester, Cheshire, England. The chapel is recorded in the National Heritage List for England as a designated Grade II listed building.

== History ==
The hospital originated as the County Lunatic Asylum in 1827–29. In 1865 buildings were added, including a house for the superintendent and a chapel. The architect was "apparently" T. M. Lockwood. It has subsequently been converted into use as a Spiritual Centre.

== Architecture ==
The chapel is constructed in brick, with ashlar dressings and slate roofs. Its architectural style is Early English. Its plan includes a six-bay nave, a single-bay chancel, vestries, and north and south porches. At the west gable is a bellcote containing a clock. The east window has three lights, and at the west end is a two-light window.

== See also ==
- Listed buildings in Upton-by-Chester
- Countess of Chester Hospital
