= Harry Beswick =

Harry Beswick may refer to:

- Harry Beswick (politician) (1860–1934), mayor of Christchurch
- Harry Beswick (architect) (1856–1929), county architect for Chester
