= Upton-by-Chester railway station =

Former railway station in England

Upton-by-Chester
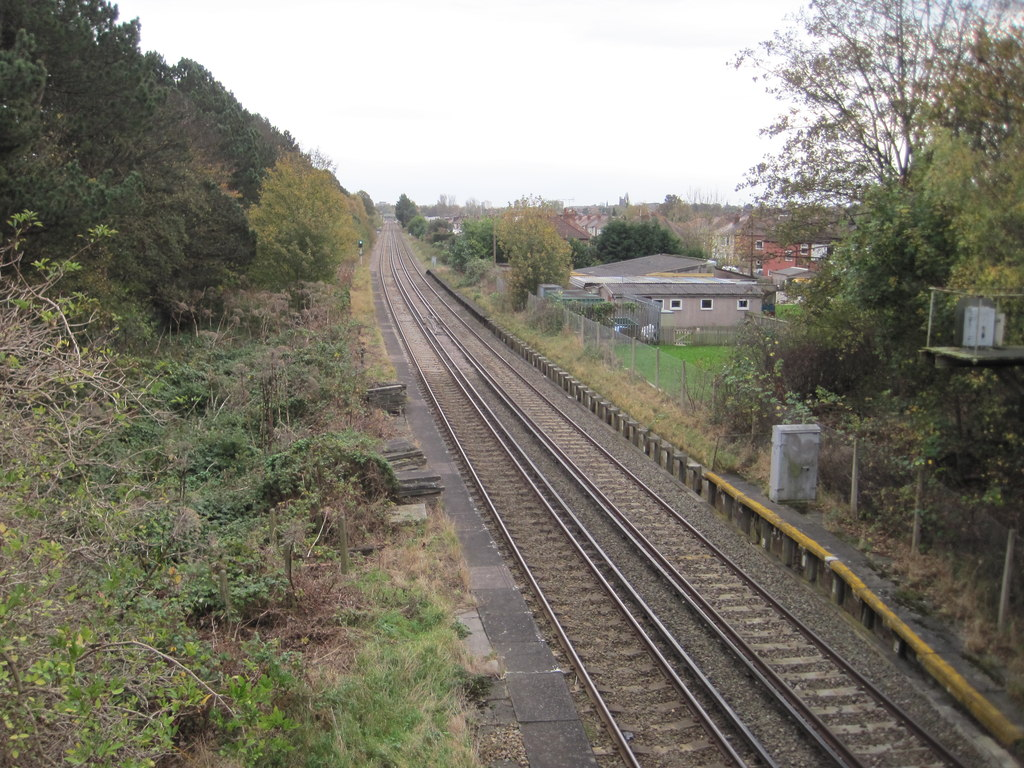
- Site of the station (2014) seen from Liverpool Road bridge

General information
- Location: Upton-by-Chester, Cheshire West and Chester; England
- Coordinates: 53.2147444°N 2.8954222°W
- Grid reference: SJ403689
- Platforms: Two

Other information
- Status: Disused

History
- Original company: Birkenhead Joint Railway
- Post-grouping: Birkenhead Joint Railway

Key dates
- 17 July 1939: Station opened as Upton-by-Chester Halt
- 6 May 1968: Renamed Upton-by-Chester
- 9 January 1984: Closed
Location

Upton-by-Chester is a former station situated on the Chester–Birkenhead line which was built by the Chester and Birkenhead Railway. It was located by the Liverpool Road road bridge where it crossed the railway near Upton and not far from Moston.

== History ==
It was opened on 17 July 1939 as Upton-by-Chester Halt by the Birkenhead Railway, which was jointly owned by the GWR and LMS railway companies. The station had two adjacent side platforms with a ticket office.

The station was established to serve the growing village of Upton and the surrounding area. During the Second World War, it also served Moston Military Hospital (now Dale Barracks, Chester).

On 6 May 1968 the word "Halt" was dropped from the station name.

In 1983, work started at the site of a former coalyard 700 metres (2,300 ft) south of this station and next to where a new supermarket was under development. Bache opened the same day Upton-by-Chester closed on 9 January 1984. Its former side platforms are overgrown but they can still seen from passing trains and Liverpool Road bridge (A5116).

== Services ==
Preceding station	Historical railways	Following station
Chester General; Line and station open	GWR & LNWR; Chester and Birkenhead Railway	Mollington; Line open, station closed
