= Mollington railway station =

Former railway station in England

Coordinates: 53°13′59.26″N 2°54′51.02″W

Mollington

General information
- Location: Mollington, Cheshire West and Chester; England
- Platforms: Two

Other information
- Status: Disused

History
- Opened: 23 September 1840
- Closed: 7 March 1960
- Original company: Chester and Birkenhead Railway
Location

Mollington railway station was on the Chester and Birkenhead Railway near to the village of Mollington in Cheshire, England. The station opened on 23 September 1840 at the same time as the railway line and closed to passengers on 7 March 1960 due to its remote location and fairly low passenger numbers. It remained open for goods traffic until 4 January 1965, but only as an unstaffed public siding. The station building still exists as a private house and the line is now operated by Merseyrail as part of the Wirral Line. The very wide embankment in this area included a public footpath, making it possible to walk next to the railway line; the zone was known to local naturalists for its flowers and butterflies.

== Services ==
Preceding station	Historical railways	Following station
Upton-by-Chester; Line open, station closed	GWR & LNWR; Chester and Birkenhead Railway	Capenhurst; Line and station open
