= Chester Royal Infirmary =

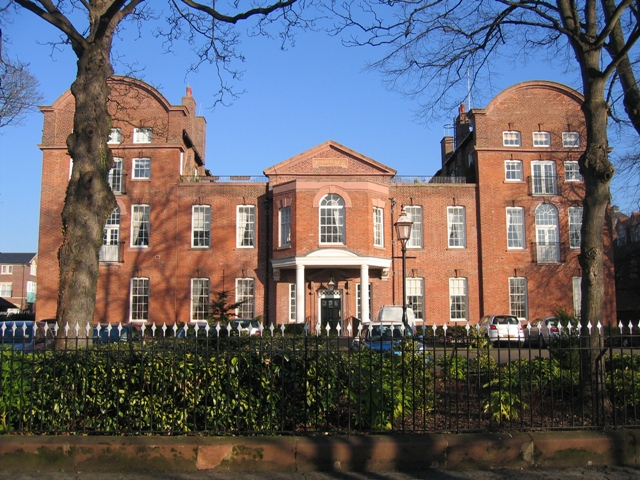
- Chester Royal Infirmary

- Location in Cheshire
- 53.1914°N 2.8975°W
- Location: City Walls Road, Chester, Cheshire, England
- OS grid reference: SJ 401 664

History
- Built: 1758–61

Site notes
- Architect(s): William Yoxall; William Cole, junior W. T. and P. H. Lockwood
- Architectural style: Georgian

Listed Building – Grade II
- Designated: 10 January 1972
- Reference no.: 1376177

Chester Royal Infirmary is a former hospital on City Walls Road, Chester, Cheshire, England. The original hospital building, which was founded in the mid 18th century, is recorded in the National Heritage List for England as a designated Grade II listed building. The hospital was expanded in the early 20th century. It closed in the 1990s. The site has been redeveloped for apartments and housing.

== History ==
The hospital was founded in 1755 following a bequest by Dr William Stratford, who had died two years earlier. It was funded by public subscriptions, and was free to patients who were recommended by the subscribers. It was originally housed in temporary accommodation in part of Bluecoat School. Construction of the permanent building was started in 1758, and was completed in 1761. It was designed by William Yoxall, and the interior was remodelled in 1830 by William Cole, junior. Over the years, extensions were built, and by 1902 the hospital had 118 beds. The appellation "Royal" was added in 1914 when George V opened the Albert Wood wing, which contained six new wards. This wing was designed by W. T. and P. H. Lockwood, as was a further extension in 1931. During the 1990s patients were transferred to new facilities provided by the Countess of Chester Hospital, and the infirmary closed. Other than the original building, all the later extensions were demolished in 1998. The original hospital building has been converted into apartments.

== Architecture ==
The hospital is constructed in brown brick with stone dressings and has grey-green slate roofs. The entrance front faces City Walls Road. North and south wings stretch back to join an east wing to form a courtyard; these wings contained the wards. The entrance front has two storeys plus cellars; the wards have three storeys plus attics and basements. The entrance front is in seven bays. A porch projects from the centre of the ground floor. It has two Doric columns, and supports the middle three bays of the upper storey that form a canted projection. Above the porch is a floor band and a segmental pediment. Each bay of the upper storey contains a sash window, that in the middle bay having a round-headed arch painted with "ERECTED 1761". Above the windows is a frieze and a pedimented gable with a plaque inscribed "INFIRMARY". Elsewhere all the windows are sashes, or French windows leading to balconies that have been removed.

== See also ==
- Grade II listed buildings in Chester (central)
