= Holy Ascension Church, Upton-by-Chester =

Coordinates: 53.2157°N 2.8879°W

Holy Ascension Church, Upton by Chester
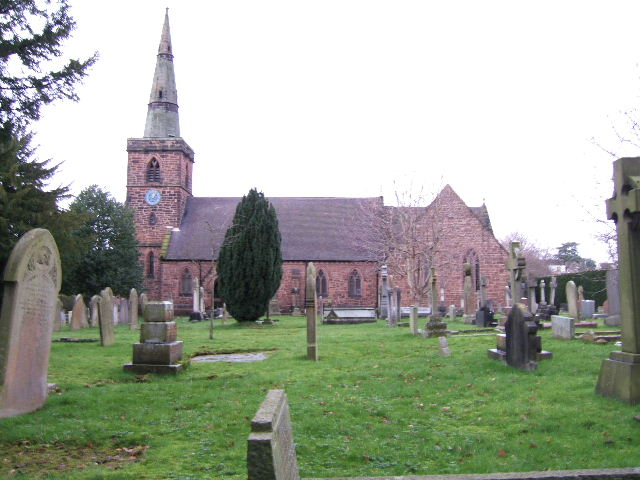
- Holy Ascension Church, Upton by Chester, from the northwest

- Location in Cheshire
- OS grid reference: SJ 408 691
- Location: Church Lane, Upton-by-Chester, Chester, Cheshire
- Country: England
- Denomination: Anglican
- Website: Holy Ascension, Upton

History
- Status: Parish church

Architecture
- Functional status: Active
- Heritage designation: Grade II
- Designated: 1 June 1967
- Architects: James Harrison
- Architectural type: Church
- Style: Gothic Revival
- Groundbreaking: 1853
- Completed: 1967

Specifications
- Materials: Sandstone, tile roofs

Administration
- Province: York
- Diocese: Chester
- Archdeaconry: Chester
- Deanery: Chester
- Parish: Holy Ascension, Upton

Clergy
- Vicar: Revd Paul Newman

Holy Ascension Church is in Church Lane, Upton-by-Chester, Chester, Cheshire, England. It is an active Anglican parish church in the deanery of Chester, the archdeaconry of Chester and the diocese of Chester. The church is recorded in the National Heritage List for England as a designated Grade II listed building.

== History ==
Holy Ascension Church was designed by James Harrison, and built between 1853 and 1854. Transepts were added in 1958 and in 1967 by A. C. Bennett, working with the Design Group Partnership.

Labour Party former Deputy Prime Minister John Prescott married his wife Pauline (nee Tilston) at this church in 1961.

== Architecture ==
The church is constructed in red sandstone rubble with ashlar dressings, and has a red tile roof. Its plan consists of a five-bay nave, a south porch, a two-bay chancel with north and south transepts, and a west tower. The tower is in three stages, standing on a plinth. It has diagonal buttresses, two-light windows, louvred bell openings and a plain parapet. The tower is surmounted by a spire containing lucarnes. The nave windows have two lights, there are three-light windows in the transepts, and east window also has three lights. Stained glass is by Kempe; that in the west window is dated 1883, in the east window it is dated 1885, and elsewhere there are windows dated between 1871 and 1873. The two-manual organ was made by Charles Whiteley and Company.

== Churchyard ==
The churchyard contains Commonwealth war graves of three British Army soldiers of World War I and two soldiers and an airman of World War II.

== See also ==
- Listed buildings in Upton-by-Chester
