= Oakfield Manor =

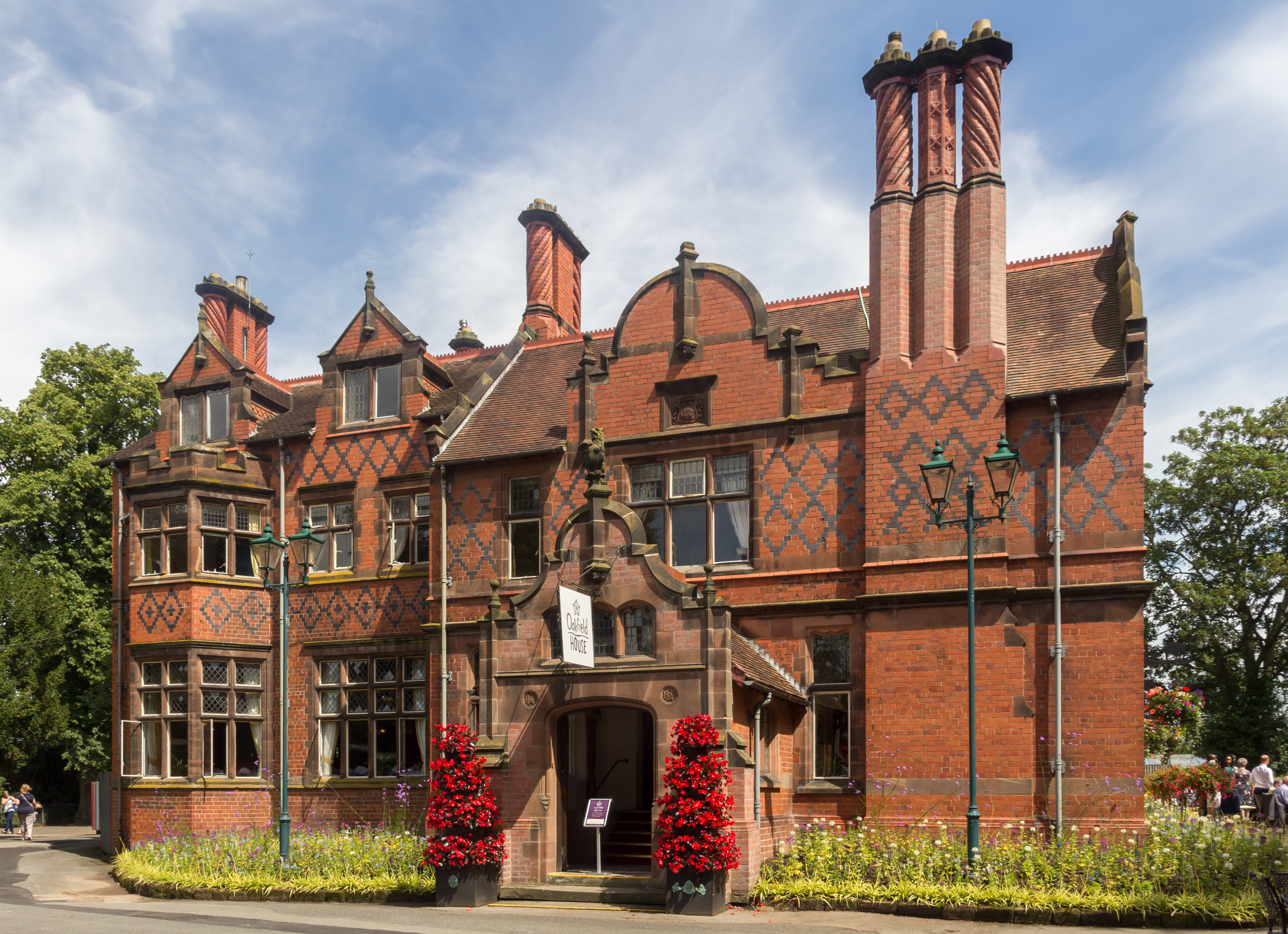
- Oakfield Manor

- Location in Cheshire
- 53.2251°N 2.8792°W
- Location: Upton-by-Chester, Cheshire, England
- OS grid reference: SJ 414 702

History
- Built: c. 1885
- Built for: B. Chaffers Roberts

Site notes
- Architect(s): Edward Ould, Harry Beswick

Listed Building – Grade II
- Designated: 27 November 1984
- Reference no.: 1230120

Oakfield Manor was originally a country house in Upton-by-Chester, near Chester, Cheshire, England. Since the 1930s it has been the headquarters of Chester Zoo. The house and its stables are recorded separately in the National Heritage List for England as designated Grade II listed buildings.

== History ==
The house was built in about 1885 for B. Chaffers Roberts, and designed by Edward Ould. The stables are dated 1886, and were probably also designed by Ould. The house was extended in 1892 for the same client by Harry Beswick, and some alterations have been made during the 20th century. In 1930 George Mottershead bought the house and estate for £3,500 (equivalent to £200,000 in 2025), and started the development of Chester Zoo. While the house was used for administration, the west wing of the stables was used to house lions. As the zoo has grown, the house has been retained and converted for use as a business, educational and wedding venue, and the west wing of the stables for storage.

== Architecture ==
=== House ===
Oakfield Manor is constructed in red Ruabon brick with blue-brick diapering, and red sandstone dressings. It is roofed with Welsh slate. There are four brick chimney stacks with Tudor-style decoration. The house is in two and 2½ storeys, with a west front of four bays, and a south front with three projecting bays with differing details. The architectural features include two-storey canted bay windows with a castellated parapet and dormers, differently shaped gables, and a projecting porch with a finial in the form of a griffin. Most of the windows have mullions and transoms. Inside the house is much wood panelling and some stained glass in the windows.

=== Stables ===
These are constructed in orange brick with dressings in red brick and buff sandstone. It is roofed with red tiles. The building is in one and two storeys, with a frontage of five bays. In the centre is an archway, with a datestone flanked by plaques with horses' heads. To the right of the archway is a circular stair turret surmounted by a hexagonal spire. On the base of the turret are marks of lions' claws.

== See also ==
- Listed buildings in Upton-by-Chester
