= Listed buildings in Upton-by-Chester =

Upton-by-Chester is a civil parish in Cheshire West and Chester, England. It contains eight buildings that are recorded in the National Heritage List for England as designated listed buildings, all of which are listed at Grade II. This grade is the lowest of the three gradings given to listed buildings and is applied to "buildings of national importance and special interest". Part of the parish is a suburb of the city of Chester. It also contains the Countess of Chester Hospital, and part of Chester Zoo. The listed buildings consist of two structures associated with the hospital, a former country house now located within the zoo, a church, a former windmill, a cottage, a war memorial, and a boundary stone.

Name and location	Photograph	Date	Notes
Rose Cottage; 53.21836°N 2.88965°W	—	18th century	The exterior was altered in the 19th century. The house is in stuccoed brick with a Welsh slate roof. It has two storeys, and a symmetrical three-bay front. The windows are sashes with label moulds. In the centre is a wooden porch with a domed glass roof, and in the roof is a gabled dormer.
Upton Mill; 53.21250°N 2.88760°W		c. 1775 (probable)	The former windmill has been converted into a house. It is built in brick, and consists of a circular tapering tower, five storeys high, with a flat roof. Most of the windows are small-pane casements.
Parish boundary stone 53.21309°N 2.86697°W	—	1781	The boundary stone consists of a red triangular sandstone block with a shaped top. It is divided down the centre with a line, to the left of which is the letter "S", and to the right the letter "D".
1829 Building, Countess of Chester Hospital; 53.2116°N 2.8988°W	—	1827–29	This originated as the Cheshire County Lunatic Asylum, and was designed by William Cole, junior. It is built in brick with stone dressings, and has a hipped slate roof. It is in two and three storeys with a basement, has an E-shaped plan, and a symmetrical entrance front of 17 bays. The central bay and the pavilions at the ends project forward. The porch is in Ionic style.
Chapel, Countess of Chester Hospital; 53.21085°N 2.90051°W	—	1856	The chapel is built in red brick with stone dressings and a slate roof in Early English style. It consists of a nave, and chancel, vestries, and porches. On the west gable is a bellcote containing a clock.
Holy Ascension Church; 53.2157°N 2.8879°W		1867	The church was designed by James Harrison, and extended by the addition of transepts in 1958 and 1967. It is built in red sandstone with red tiled roofs. In addition to the transepts, the church consists of a nave, a chancel, and a west tower with a recessed spire.
Oakfield; 53.2251°N 2.8792°W		c. 1885	This originated as a country house designed by Edward Ould, with extensions in 1892 by Harry Beswick, and more alterations in the 20th century. It later became the administrative centre of Chester Zoo. The house is built in red brick with blue-brick diapering, red sandstone dressings, and a Welsh slate roof. It is in two and 2½ storeys, and has a four-bay front. Features include shaped gables, Tudor-style chimney stacks, canted bay windows with castellated parapets, dormers, and a projecting porch with a finial in the form of a griffin. Most of the windows are mullioned and transomed.
War memorial 53.21472°N 2.88623°W		1921	The war memorial stands on a paved area in a small garden by a road junction. It is in Darley Dale stone, and consists of a wheel-head cross with a tapering shaft on a square pedestal on a three-stepped square base. The head of the cross is carved with Celtic knotwork in low relief. There is an inscription on the plinth, and the names of those lost in the First World War on the base. On the base is a square stone block with an inscription and the names of those lost in the Second World War.
