= Harry Beswick (architect) =

English architect (1856–1929)

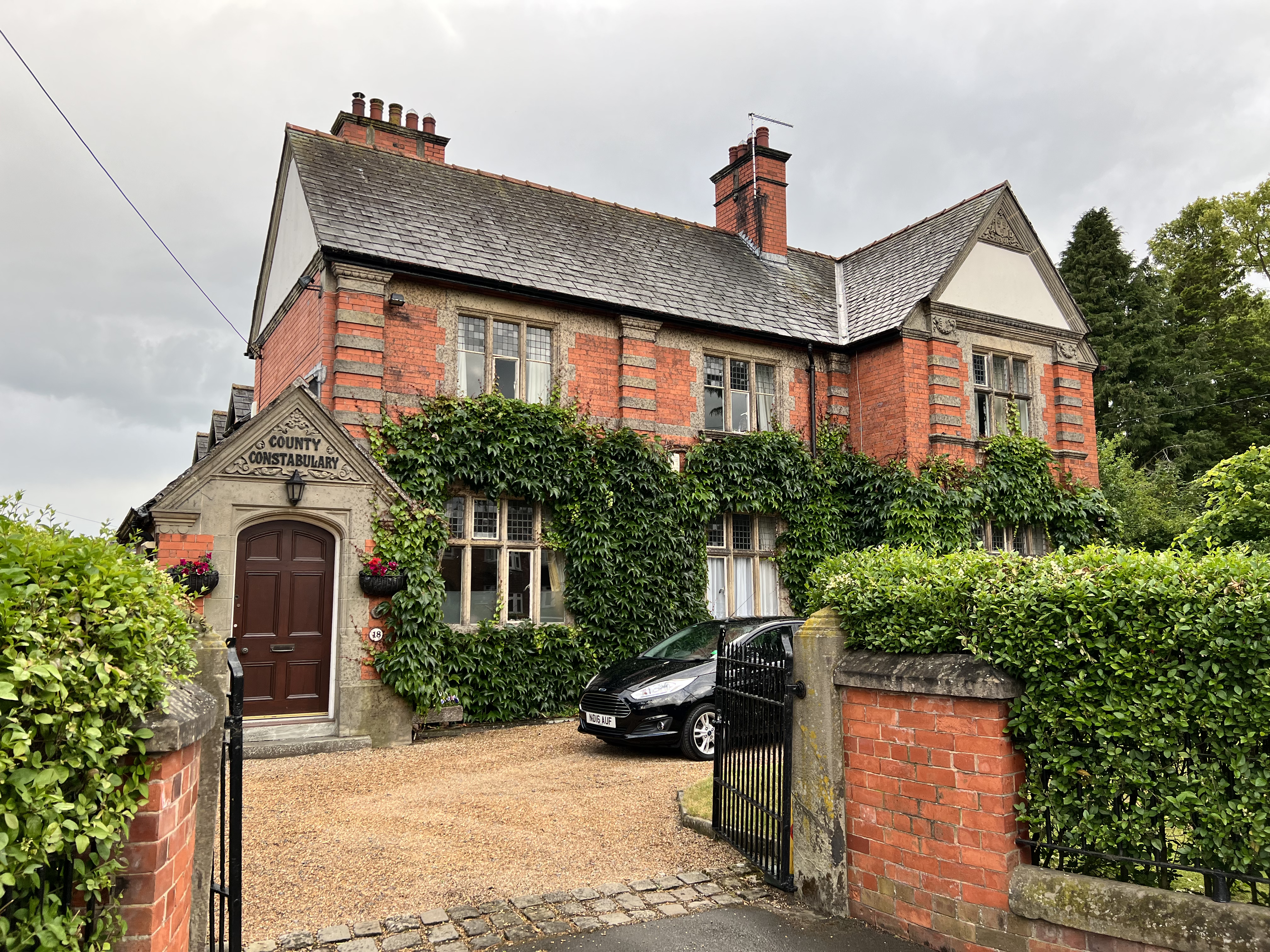
Audlem Police Station, 1901

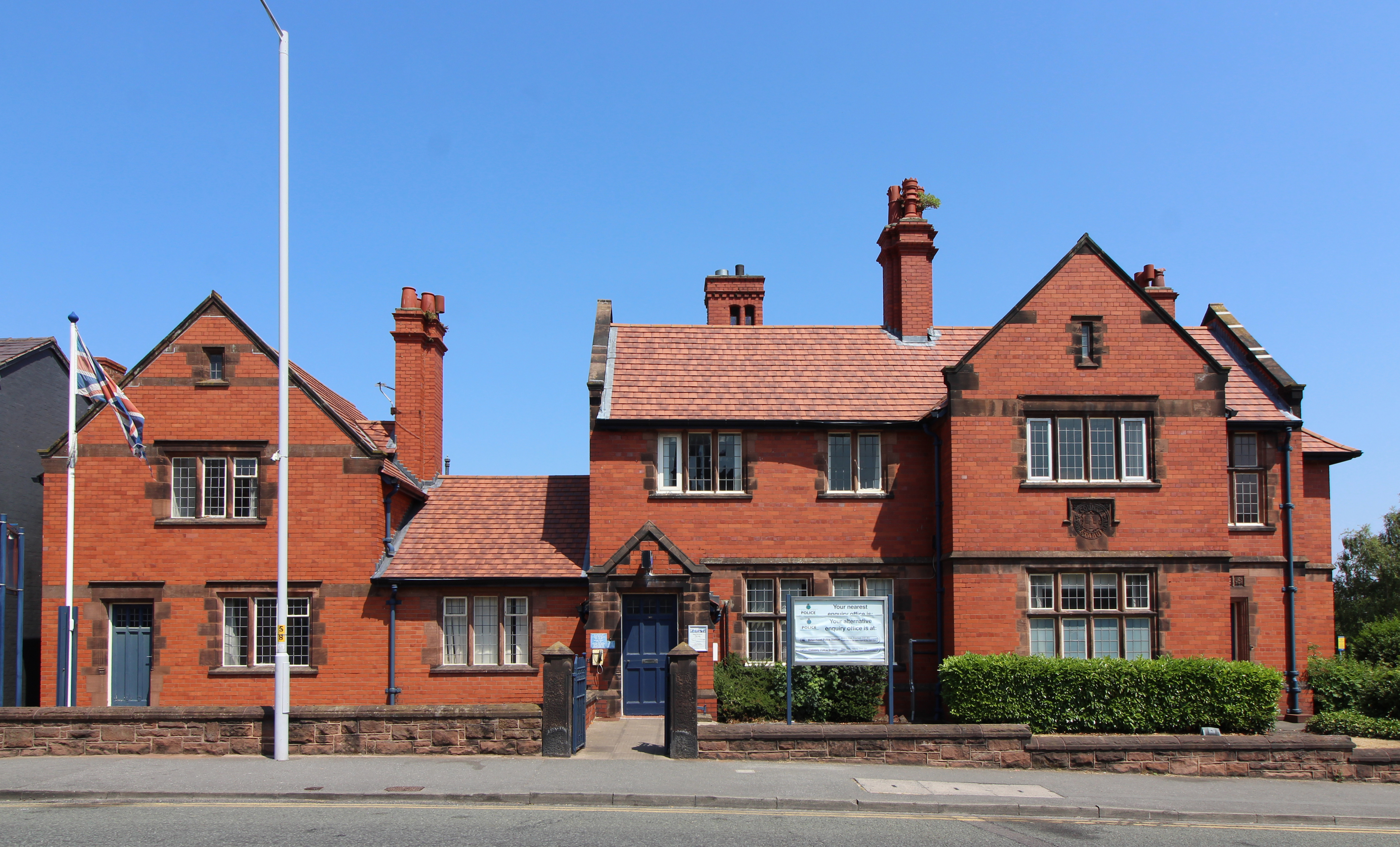
Heswall Police Station, 1911

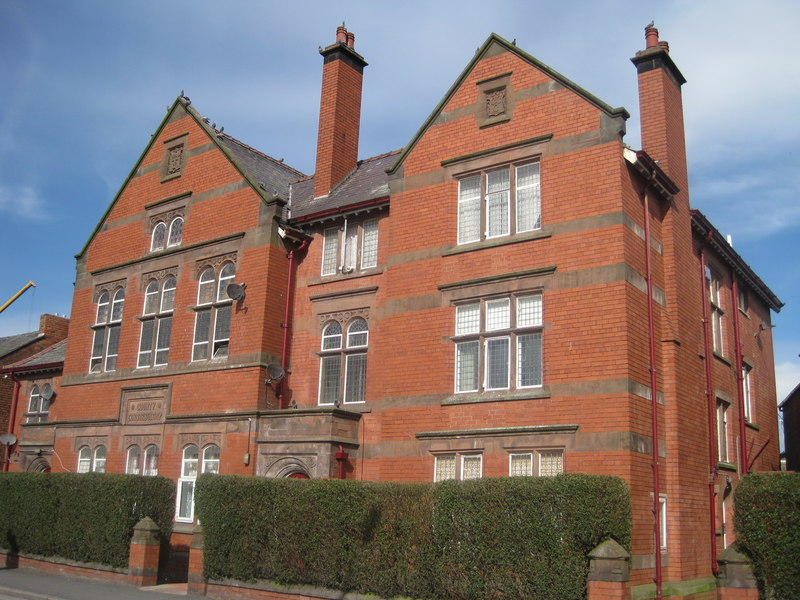
Police Station and Court, Westminster Road, Ellesmere Port

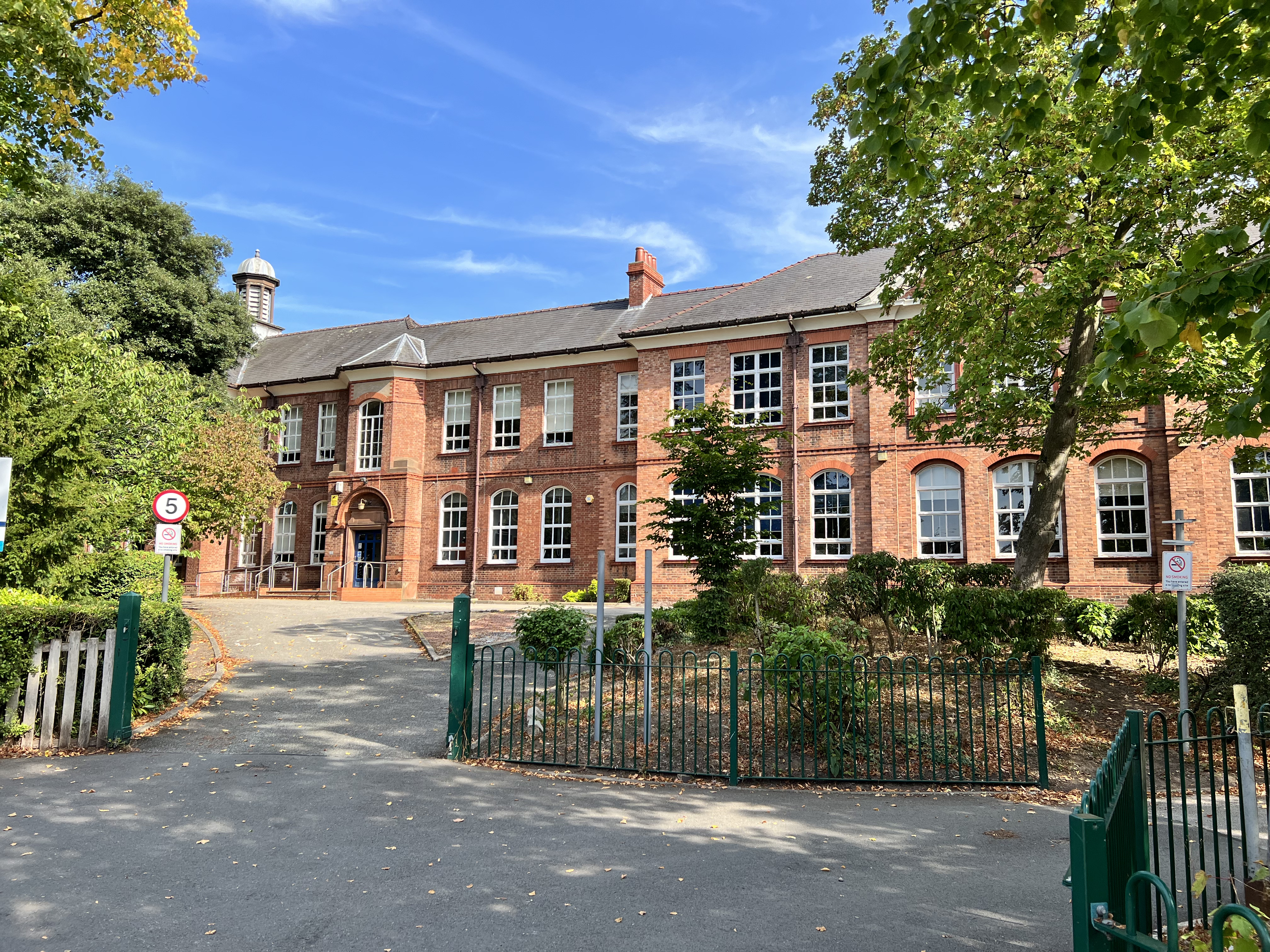
Malbank School, Nantwich, 1915–21

Harry Beswick FRIBA (1856 – 8 July 1929) was County Architect for Chester from 1895 until 1926.

== Career ==
He was born in Chester and educated at King's School, Chester where he was awarded the Duke of Westminster Gold Medal in 1871. He was articled to Thomas Meakin Lockwood of Chester from 1871 and later returned as his Managing Clerk in 1881.

He began independent practice in 1889 and in 1895 he was appointed County Architect to Cheshire County in 1895 and architect to the Cheshire Education Committee from 1904.

In 1905, he was awarded a Fellowship of the Royal Institute of British Architects.

He retired in 1926.

== Life ==
He was born in 1855, the son of William Beswick (1822–1887) and Mary Morley (1825–1915). His father was the schoolmaster at Upton-by-Chester.

On 12 August 1882 he married Edith, daughter of Charles Anderson at Aldford Parish Church. They had the following children:

- Agnes Marion Beswick (1884–1977)
- Jessie Beswick (b. 1886)
- William Beswick (1888–1981) also an architect
- Harry Beswick (b. 1890) also an architect
- Isabel Marjory Louisa Beswick (1894–1973)

He died on 8 July 1929.

== Buildings ==
- National School, Guilden Sutton 1890–91
- Oakfield Manor 1892
- Church of the Good Shepherd, Charlotte Street, Chester, 1894-95
- Westminster Schools, Peploe Street, Hoole (new classrooms) 1894-95
- St Martin’s Welsh Church, Chester (new church room) 1895-96
- Agricultural School, Salterford Hall, Holmes Chapel 1896
- Church School, Mollington 1896–97
- Unionist Club, Newgate Street, Chester 1896–97
- 3 Northgate Street, Chester 1899
- 21–23 Northgate Street, Chester 1897 (for Charles Brown)
- Runcorn Police Station (extension) 1898-99
- Sealand Isolation Hospital, Chester 1899
- Terrace of 6 houses, 158–168 New Chester Road, Port Sunlight 1899
- Police Court, Liscard, Wallasey 1900
- Police Station, Audlem 1901
- Plinth for the statue of Queen Victoria, Chester Castle, 1903
- Ruskin School, Ruskin Road, Crewe 1909
- Macclesfield High School for Girls, 1908–09
- St Werburgh Middle School, Love Street, Chester 1909
- Teacher Training College, Crewe 1910–11
- Police Station, Station Road, Cheadle Hulme 1911
- Caretaker’s House, Ruskin Road School, Rook Street 1909
- Altrincham County School for Boys 1910
- Police Station, Victoria Square, Stockton Heath 1911
- Police Station, Telegraph Road, Heswall 1911
- Grammar School, Marlborough Road, Bowdon 1911
- Lymm Grammar School (additions) 1911–12
- Alderley Edge Council School (additions) 1912
- Aston Council School, Runcorn 1912
- Upton Asylum (new buildings) 1913
- Brown and Co, Eastgate Street, Chester (extension) 1914–15
- Grammar School, Nantwich 1915–21 (now Malbank School)
- County High School for Girls, West Kirby (additions) 1921
- Reaseheath School of Agrigulcture, (new buildings) 1924
- Altrincham Grammar School for Boys (additions) 1925
- Court House and Constabulary, 70-104 Chapel Street, Dukinfield
- Altrincham Grammar School for Girls (additions)
- Police Station, Green Lane, Wilmslow
- Knot Hotel, 51 Whitby Road, Ellesmere Port
- Police Station, High Street, Taporley
- Police Station and Court, Westminster Road, Ellesmere Port
- Police Station and Court, Barnhill Road, Broxton
