= Warrington and Vale Royal College =

Warrington & Vale Royal College

Location
- Winwick Road; Warrington, Cheshire, WA2 8QA; England; 53°24′27″N 2°35′34″W

Information
- Type: Further Education College
- Motto: Learning Without Limits
- Religious affiliation: Mixed
- Local authority: Warrington
- Department for Education URN: 130617 Tables
- Ofsted: Reports
- Principal: Nicola Newton
- Gender: Mixed
- Age: 16 to 19
- Website: http://www.wvr.ac.uk/

Warrington and Vale Royal College, previously known as Warrington Collegiate, is a vocational learning provider in Warrington and Winsford, Cheshire for people aged 16–19, as well as courses aimed at adult learners. The college mainly offers vocational courses, ranging from GCSE, BTECs at levels 3,4 and 5, A-Level, professional development, business courses, trade union courses and preparation of life and work after education.

== Merge with Mid Cheshire College ==
In August 2017, Warrington Collegiate and Mid Cheshire College announced that they were to merge in time for the September 2017 enrollments to form Warrington and Vale Royal College. The merger led to a redesigned logo and website, though the current Warrington Campus still has some old "Warrington Collegiate" signage. As a result of the merger, the college now has two campuses; the site in Warrington and the former Mid Cheshire College site in Winsford. A third former Mid Cheshire College site in Hartford has been closed.

== Awards ==
Warrington Collegiate, when it was called as such, has been nationally recognised in sustainability and energy efficiency, winning numerous awards;

- 2011 Winner of "Best Sustainability Initiative Award" at the UK Public Sector Digital Awards.
- 2011 Winner of the "Best Energy Efficiency Project" at the National Tech World Awards.
- 2011 Winner of "Recognition of Innovation Award" by the Regional Support Centre.
- 2010 Runner-up of the "Green ICT Award" at the Green Gown Awards.
