= Moston, Cheshire West and Chester =

Village in Cheshire, England

Coordinates: 53.223°N 2.898°W

Moston
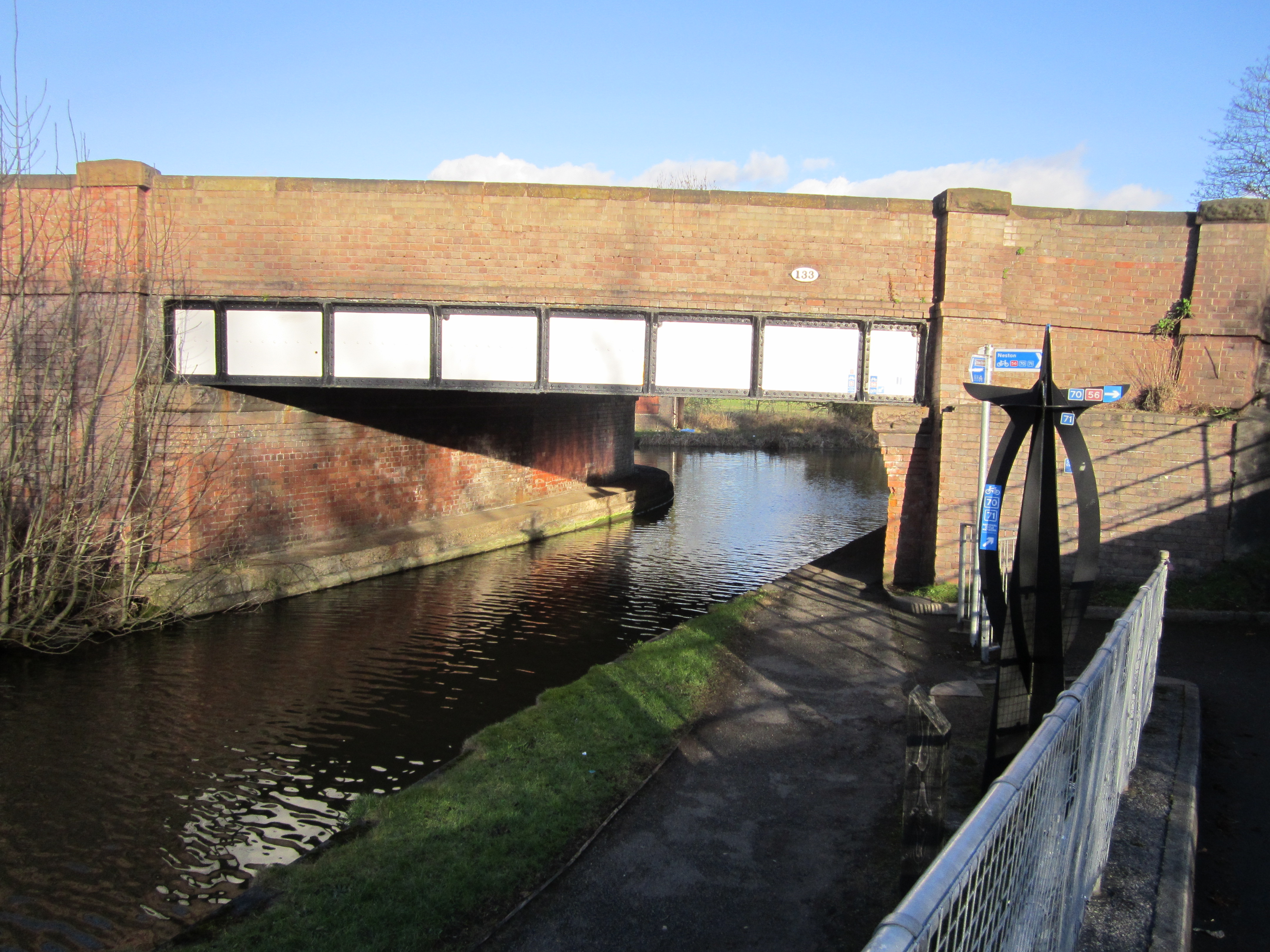
- Shropshire Union Canal bridge 133 near Moston

- Location within Cheshire
- Population: 642 (2011 census)
- OS grid reference: SJ401699
- Civil parish: Moston
- Unitary authority: Cheshire West and Chester
- Ceremonial county: Cheshire
- Region: North West
- Country: England
- Sovereign state: United Kingdom
- Post town: CHESTER
- Postcode district: CH2
- Dialling code: 01244
- Police: Cheshire
- Fire: Cheshire
- Ambulance: North West
- UK Parliament: City of Chester

Moston is a small village and civil parish in the unitary authority of Cheshire West and Chester and the ceremonial county of Cheshire, England. It is in the north east of Chester, close to the Shropshire Union Canal and the A41 trunk road between Chester and Birkenhead. Moston combines with Bache and Upton-by-Chester to form a joint parish council.

== History ==
Including the hamlet of The Dale, Moston was a township in St. Mary on the Hill Parish of Broxton Hundred.

The present Moston Hall was built in 1789 for Richard Massey and first used as a military hospital during World War I. A nearby house, known as The Dale, had been built in the 1880s on the Moston Hall estate. Both buildings were purchased by the War Office in 1938 and the site became the Dale Barracks.

== Demography ==
The population was recorded as 14 in both 1801 and fifty years later in 1851, then 51 in 1901 and rising to 850 by 1951. According to the 2001 census, Moston had a population of 680, falling to 642 by the 2011 census.
