= Blacon High School =

Location
- Melbourne Road; Blacon, Cheshire, CH1 5JH; England
- Coordinates: 53.20343°N 2.93577°W

Information
- Type: Foundation school
- Local authority: Cheshire West and Chester
- Specialist: Sports
- Department for Education URN: 111396 Tables
- Ofsted: Reports
- Headteacher: Rachel Hudson
- Gender: Coeducational
- Age: 11 to 16
- Enrolment: 682 as of January 2023
- Website: http://www.blaconhighschool.net/

Blacon High School, officially Blacon High School, A Specialist Sports College, is a coeducational secondary school located in Blacon in the English county of Cheshire.

As a foundation school, Blacon is administered by Cheshire West and Chester Council.

Blacon High School offers GCSEs, BTECs and Cambridge Nationals as programmes of study for pupils. There are also some vocational courses available.

== History ==
The school moved into a new building in 2016 as part of the Priority Schools Building Programme.

In January 2025, the school closed temporarily after being the victim of a ransomware attack.
