= Blacon =

Suburb of Chester, England

Coordinates: 53.2052°N 2.9275°W

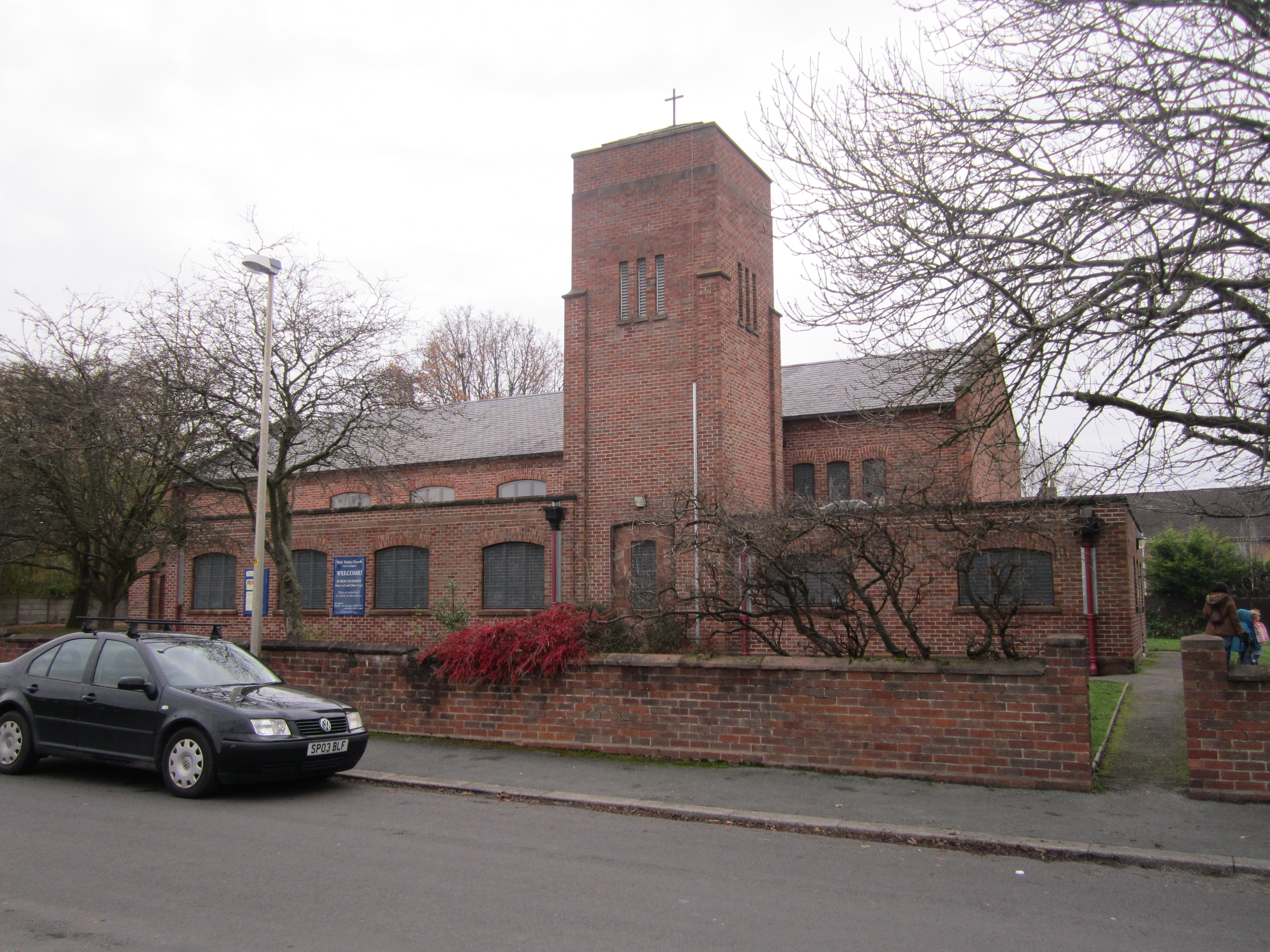
- Holy Trinity Church, Blacon

- Location within Cheshire
- Population: 13,626 (2011 Census)
- OS grid reference: SJ385675
- Unitary authority: Cheshire West and Chester
- Ceremonial county: Cheshire
- Region: North West
- Country: England
- Sovereign state: United Kingdom
- Post town: CHESTER
- Postcode district: CH1
- Dialling code: 01244
- Police: Cheshire
- Fire: Cheshire
- Ambulance: North West
- UK Parliament: Chester North and Neston

Blacon is a suburb of Chester, England. It is predominantly a council housing estate and was formerly regarded as one of the largest council estates in Europe.

== Geography ==
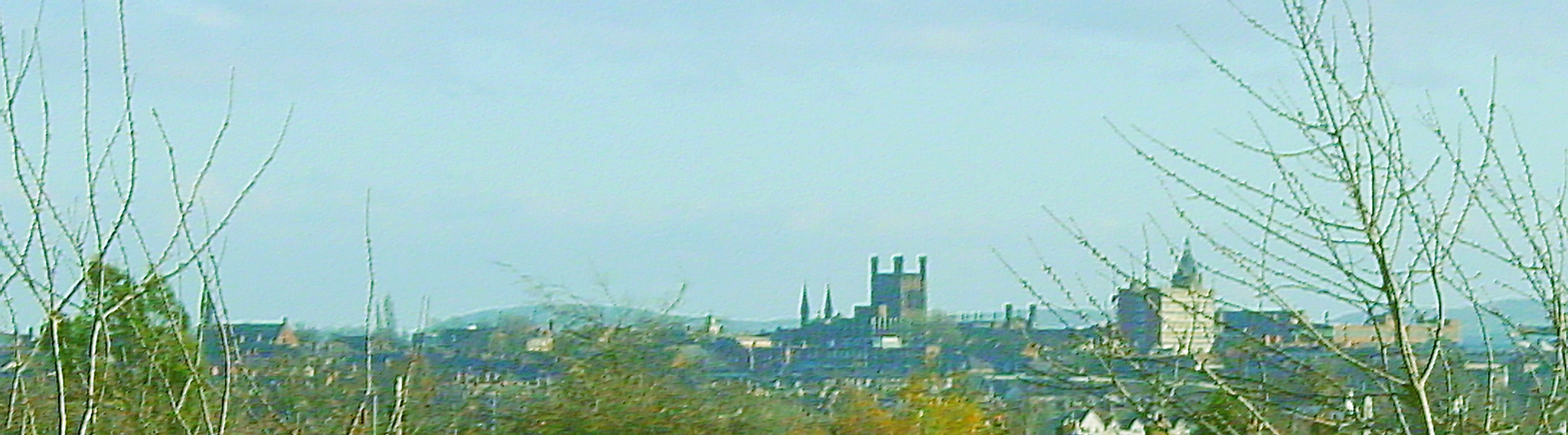
Chester Cathedral viewed from Blacon

Blacon lies close to the England–Wales border, approximately 1 mile (1.6 km) north-west of Chester city centre, on elevated ground overlooking the city. The area was formerly farmland and remains bordered by open countryside. Views extend across Chester and towards the Welsh hills to the west.

Nearby settlements include Upton-by-Chester to the north, Saughall and Mollington to the north-west, Newtown to the north-east, and the border town of Saltney to the south. Blacon is approximately 6.5 miles (10.5 km) from Overpool on the Wirral.

== History ==
=== North Blacon (Blacon Hall) ===
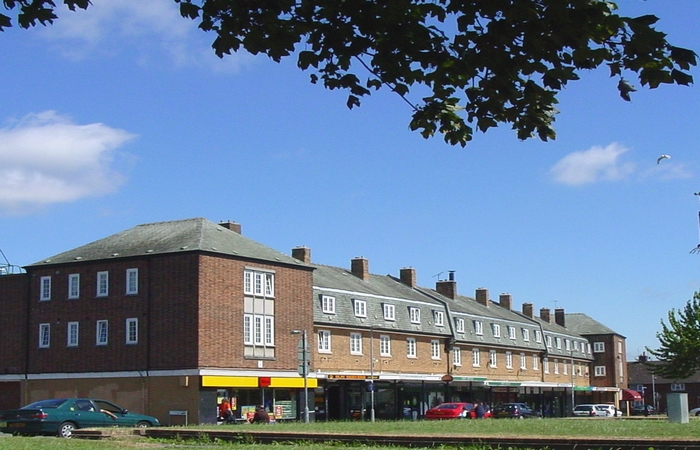
The Parade shops in Blacon

Blacon was historically known as Blakon Hill and was owned by the Marquess of Crewe. The parish of Blacon cum Crabwall was formed in 1923. On 1 April 1936, under the Cheshire County Review Order 1936, most of the parish was transferred to Chester County Borough.

Blacon remained a small farming community until extensive housebuilding by Chester City Council began in the early 1950s. Much of the original estate was constructed during the decade to 1960. Further development took place on the former army camp site in South Blacon during the late 1960s, 1970s and 1980s.

'The Parade' shops, built in 1954 in North Blacon, are an example of municipal development. In 2015, the Parade Enterprise Centre opened as a joint venture between Avenue Services and Cheshire West and Chester Council. The centre accommodates Sanctuary Housing, Blacon Library, a community hall and offices for local businesses.

=== Blacon Camp (Blacon Lodge) ===
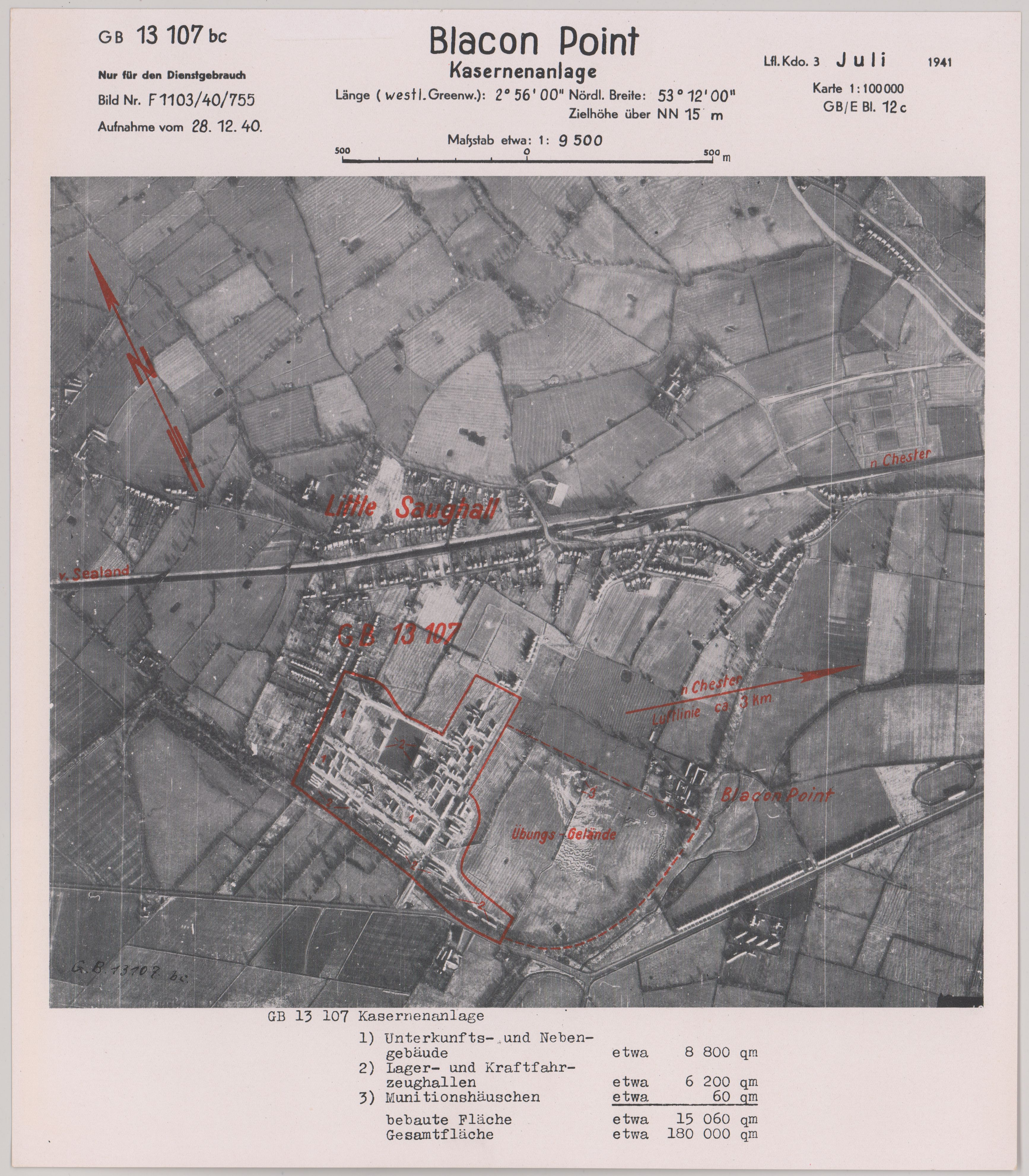
Blacon Camp on a German Luftwaffe target dossier, July 1941

The British Army maintained a camp in South Blacon from shortly before until shortly after the Second World War. Wooden and Nissen hut structures were occupied by soldiers until the late 1950s. An army firing range remained in use until the construction of Chester City Council tower blocks in the mid-1960s. The camp housed various military operations, including aircraft and prisoners of war. The area continues to be referred to locally as 'The Camp'.

== Community initiatives ==
The Blacon Together Pathfinder was established in 2001 as part of the first round of Pathfinders. The community subsequently participated in initiatives led by the government's Neighbourhood Management Pathfinder Programme. A number of projects have since been developed by and for residents.

Improvement work has continued through the Blacon Community Trust in partnership with Chester and District Housing Trust under the name 'The Blacon Alliance'.

== Policing ==
Blacon is the location of the Western Division headquarters of Cheshire Constabulary.

== Education ==
=== Primary schools ===
- Highfield Community Primary School
- J. H. Godwin Primary School
- Dee Point Primary School
- St Theresa's Catholic Primary School
- The Arches Community Primary School

=== Secondary school ===
- Blacon High School, formerly a specialist Sports College

=== Former schools ===
- Bishop's School
- Charles Kingsley Secondary School for Girls
- Highfield Middle School
- Dee Point Middle School

== Places of worship ==
Blacon contains places of worship serving Christian and Islamic communities. Holy Trinity-without-the-Walls is the Church of England parish church. St Theresa's Roman Catholic Church, erected in 1959, is associated with St Theresa's Catholic Primary School. The Kingdom Hall of Jehovah's Witnesses is located on Melbourne Road. Shah Jalal Mosque stands on Clifton Drive in the southern part of the suburb.

== Blacon Cemetery ==
Blacon Cemetery was established in 1940 during the Second World War, when two plots in Sections A and H were set aside for service burials. The first interment took place on 20 December 1941.

The cemetery contains the war graves of 461 Commonwealth service personnel, including one unidentified Royal Air Force airman, and 97 personnel of other nationalities, most of whom were Polish servicemen. These graves are maintained by the Commonwealth War Graves Commission. Section A served as a regional cemetery for Royal Air Force personnel from Cheshire and neighbouring counties, while members of other services were buried in Section H.

Chester Crematorium, adjoining Section A, opened in 1965. A new chapel was constructed alongside the original building and opened in April 2013; the former chapel site was subsequently converted into a memorial garden.

== Blacon railway station ==
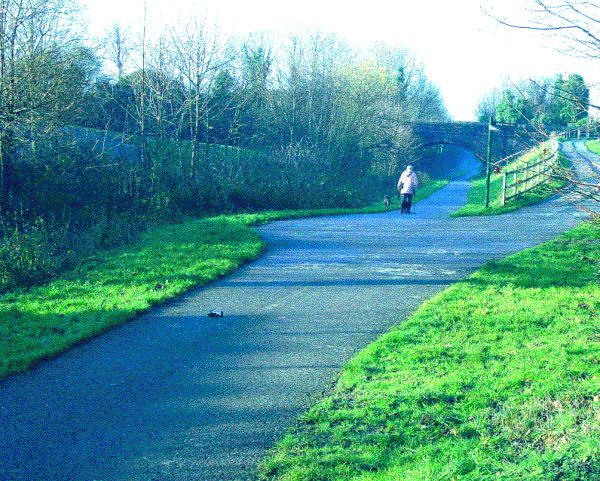
Blacon railway station in December 2006

Blacon railway station was served from Chester Northgate railway station. It closed to passengers on 9 September 1968 as part of the Beeching Axe. Freight services continued until 20 April 1984, resumed on a single-track line on 31 August 1986, and ceased again in 1992.

The former railway line has been converted into a surfaced cycle path and walkway linking Blacon with Chester and North Wales countryside routes.

Community-led improvements to the former station site began in 2008 in partnership with Blacon Community Trust. Landscaping, public art and access enhancements have since been introduced.

== Politics ==
Blacon forms part of the Cheshire West and Chester unitary authority, created in April 2009 following the abolition of Chester City Council as part of the 2009 structural changes to local government in England.

For parliamentary representation, Blacon lies within the Chester North and Neston constituency and is represented in the House of Commons by Samantha Dixon of the Labour Party.
