= Upton-by-Chester =

Civil parish in Cheshire, England

Coordinates: 53.214°N 2.884°W

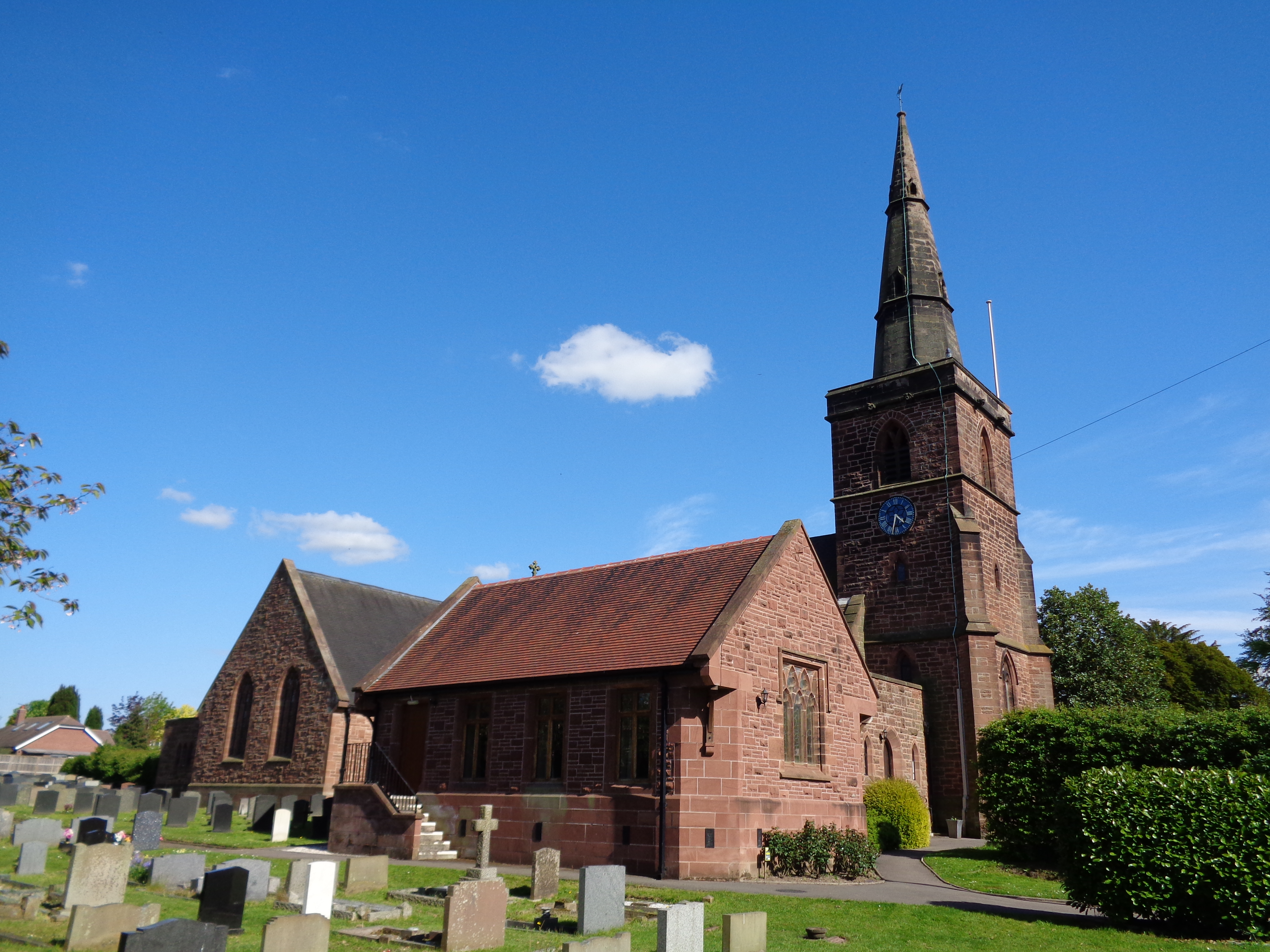
- Holy Ascension Church, Upton by Chester

- Location within Cheshire
- Population: 7,956 (2011 census)
- OS grid reference: SJ405665
- Civil parish: Upton-by-Chester
- Unitary authority: Cheshire West and Chester
- Ceremonial county: Cheshire
- Region: North West
- Country: England
- Sovereign state: United Kingdom
- Post town: CHESTER
- Postcode district: CH2
- Dialling code: 01244
- Police: Cheshire
- Fire: Cheshire
- Ambulance: North West
- UK Parliament: Chester North and Neston

Upton-by-Chester is a civil parish and a large suburb on the outskirts of Chester, in the unitary authority area of Cheshire West and Chester and the ceremonial county of Cheshire, England. It includes the village Upton Heath.

== History ==
The name Upton is from the Old English upp, meaning up, higher or upon, and tūn, meaning a farmstead or settlement.

Listed in the Domesday Book of 1086 as Optone and being in the possession of Earl Hugh of Chester, its entry reads:

"In Wilaveston/Wirral Hundred. Upton. Earl Edwin held it.41/2 hides paying tax. Land for 12 ploughs. In lordship 1; 2 ploughmen; 12 villagers and 2 riders with 5 ploughs. Of this land, Hamo holds 2 parts of 1 hide of this manor; Herbert 1/2 hide; Mundret 1 hide. In lordship 4 ploughs; 8 ploughmen. 2 villagers and 2 smallholders with 1 plough. Meadow, 1 acre. Value of the whole manor before 1066, 60s; now the Earl’s lordship 45s, his men’s 40s."

Including the hamlet of Upton Heath, Upton-by-Chester was formerly a township within the parishes of St. Mary on the Hill and St. Oswald, Broxton Hundred.

Upton-by-Chester as we know it today started when the railway was built in the mid-1800s. Gentlemen's country houses were built and provided employment other than traditional rural jobs. Initially ribbon development but then housing estates were built as more people moved out of the overcrowded city. Following the post-World War II building boom there is now little development land left.

A permanent military presence was established with the completion of Dale Barracks in 1938 at nearby Moston.

== Landmarks ==
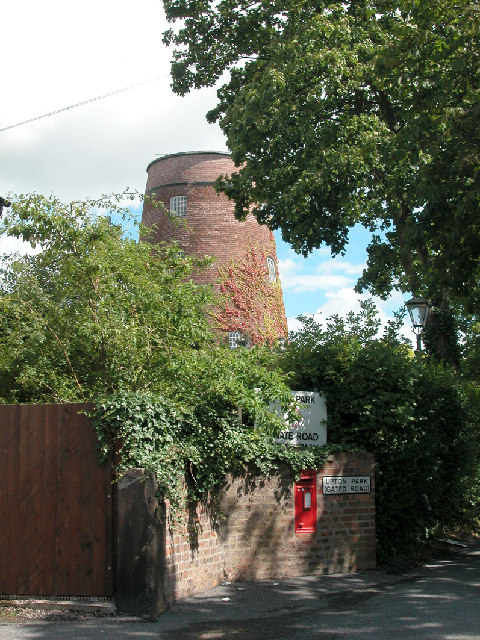
Upton Mill

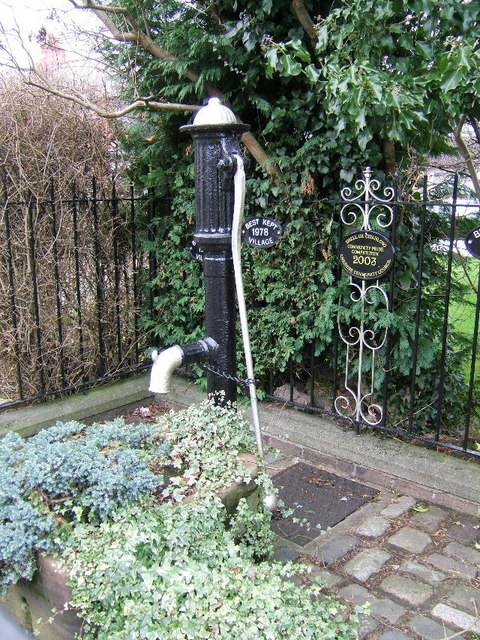
The old water pump

One building of particular interest is Upton Mill, a five storeyed brick windmill which is a Grade II listed building. Built circa 1775 this was a full working flour mill with outhouses, yard and orchard. The wind sails were removed in the early 1920s when electricity was installed. The mill closed in 1953 and remained uninhabited until 1979 when it was sold and converted as a private residence. Renovation was completed in 1988.

Oakfield Manor and its stable block, now in the grounds of Chester Zoo, are both designated Grade II listed buildings.

Estimated to be over two hundred years old, the last remaining communal water pump in Upton-by-Chester is on Heath Road. The pump was used up to the end of the nineteenth century, but in the early years of World War II was temporarily brought back into use. The well has since been covered over.

== Religion ==
Upton has four churches; one Baptist, one United Reformed Church, one Catholic (St Columba's), and the Anglican Church of the Holy Ascension.

== Governance ==
Upton-by-Chester is within the Chester North and Neston parliamentary constituency.

An electoral ward in the name of Upton exists, within the borough of Cheshire West and Chester. This unitary authority replaced both Chester City Council and Cheshire County Council on 1 April 2009.

Upton-by-Chester is a civil parish, combining with nearby Bache and Moston to form a joint parish council.

Upton-by-Chester is twinned with Arradon.

== Demography ==
The population was 173 in 1801, 555 in 1851, 1,769 in 1901 and increasing significantly to 6,343 by 1951. At the time of the 2001 census it was recorded as 7,806.

According to the 2011 census the population of the civil parish stood at 7,956, whilst the figure for the local government ward was 8,905.

== Education ==
There are four primary schools in Upton-by-Chester; namely Acresfield Academy, Mill View Primary School, Upton Heath Church of England Primary School (formerly known as Upton Manor) and Upton Westlea Primary School. Upton-by-Chester High School is a co-educational state secondary school established in 1968. There is a school for children with special educational needs or disabilities, Dorin Park School & Specialist SEN College.

== Community ==
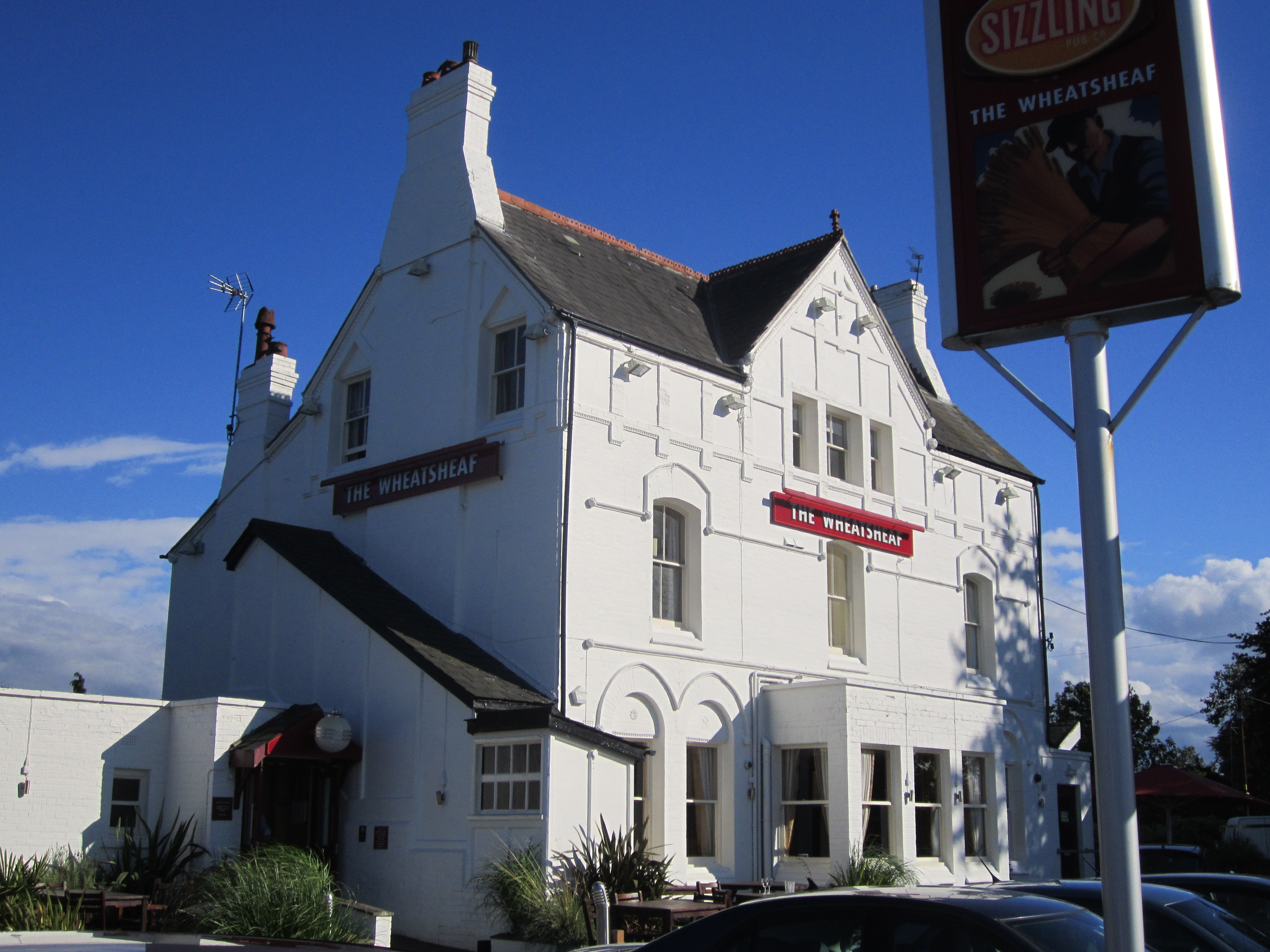
The Wheatsheaf Inn

The Countess of Chester Hospital is the principal NHS general hospital and accident & emergency department for the city of Chester and the surrounding area.

Chester Zoo opened in 1931 and is now one of the largest zoos in the United Kingdom.

In and around Upton-by-Chester there are several shopping areas, including Bache, Upton-Heath and Weston Grove. In the vicinity there are at least four pubs, including the Oak Tree, the Brewers Arms, the Mill@Upton (formerly the Egerton Arms Hotel) and The Wheatsheaf Inn.

Other local amenities include a Royal British Legion Club, the Upton-by-Chester Golf Club, a bowling green and a village hall.

== Transport ==
Bache railway station, less than a mile from Upton village centre at Bache, is on the Wirral line of the Merseyrail network. It opened in January 1984, replacing Upton-by-Chester railway station on Liverpool Road.

The Chester to Ellesmere Port section of the A41 trunk road passes through the area, separating the areas of Upton and Upton Heath. Further west is the A5116 (Liverpool Road), which joins the A41 at Moston, immediately to the north of Upton-by-Chester.

== Notable people ==
Labour Party former Deputy Prime Minister John Prescott lived with his parents in Upton after moving from Yorkshire, and married his wife Pauline (nee Tilston) at Church of the Holy Ascension in 1961.

Samantha Dixon, who became the local Labour Member of Parliament for Chester in 2022, lived in Upon-by-Chester in her early life.

The actor Tom Hughes grew up in Upton-by-Chester.

== See also ==
- Listed buildings in Upton-by-Chester
