= Westminster Park =

Park and suburb of Chester, Cheshire, England

Coordinates: 53.177°N 2.908°W

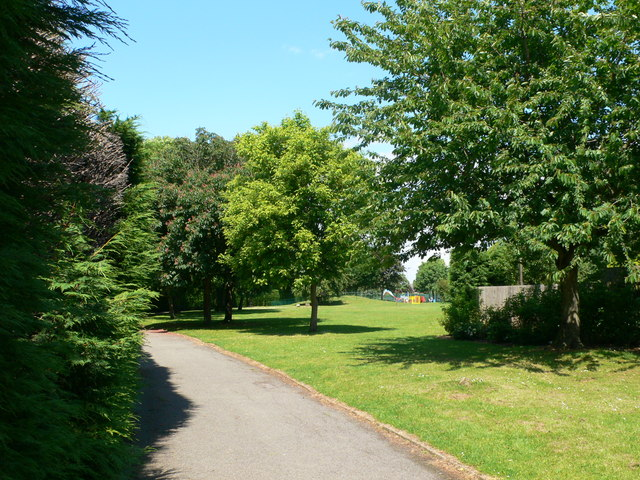
- Westminster Park, namesake of the suburb

- Location within Cheshire
- Unitary authority: Cheshire West and Chester
- Ceremonial county: Cheshire
- Region: North West
- Country: England
- Sovereign state: United Kingdom
- Post town: CHESTER
- Postcode district: CH4
- Dialling code: 01244
- Police: Cheshire
- Fire: Cheshire
- Ambulance: North West
- UK Parliament: Chester South and Eddisbury

Westminster Park is a suburb to the west of Chester, Cheshire, England, and a large public park from which the area takes its name. Although geographically close to Lache, local residents generally consider Westminster Park to be a distinct area, despite Lache Lane forming the main route through the suburb. As with many parts of Chester, the boundary between neighbouring areas is informal and not clearly defined.

== Park ==
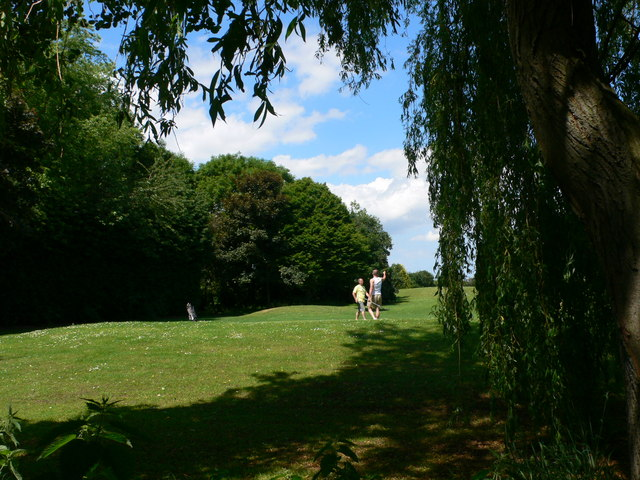
Golf course in Westminster Park

The park has been awarded Green Flag status on multiple occasions, recognising its quality, safety and maintenance. Facilities include a nine-hole municipal golf course, municipal and private tennis courts, bowling greens, a cricket pitch, football pitches, a croquet lawn and a children's play area.

== Suburb ==
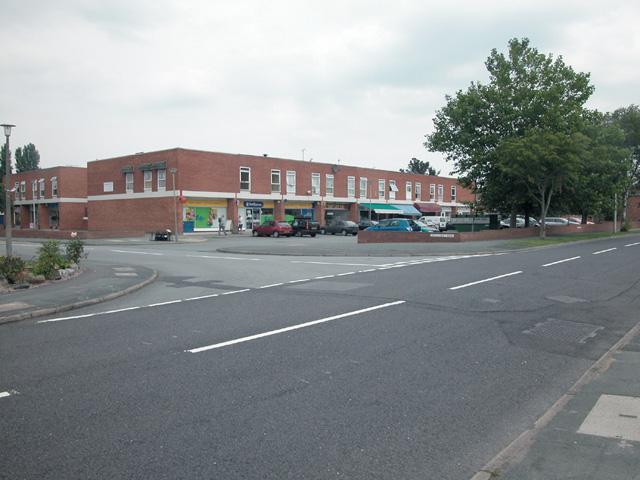
Parade of shops in Westminster Park (2005)

Westminster Park includes a small local shopping parade featuring a Co-op supermarket, delicatessen, hairdresser, beauty salon, Chinese takeaway, fish and chip shop, pharmacy, greengrocer and florist.

A gym operated by Nuffield Health is located nearby on Wrexham Road, adjacent to Chester Tennis Club and Nuffield Hospital.

Immediately to the south lies Chester Business Park, a large out-of-town office complex that is home to a number of major employers, including Lloyds Banking Group and M&S Money.

=== Kings Moat development ===
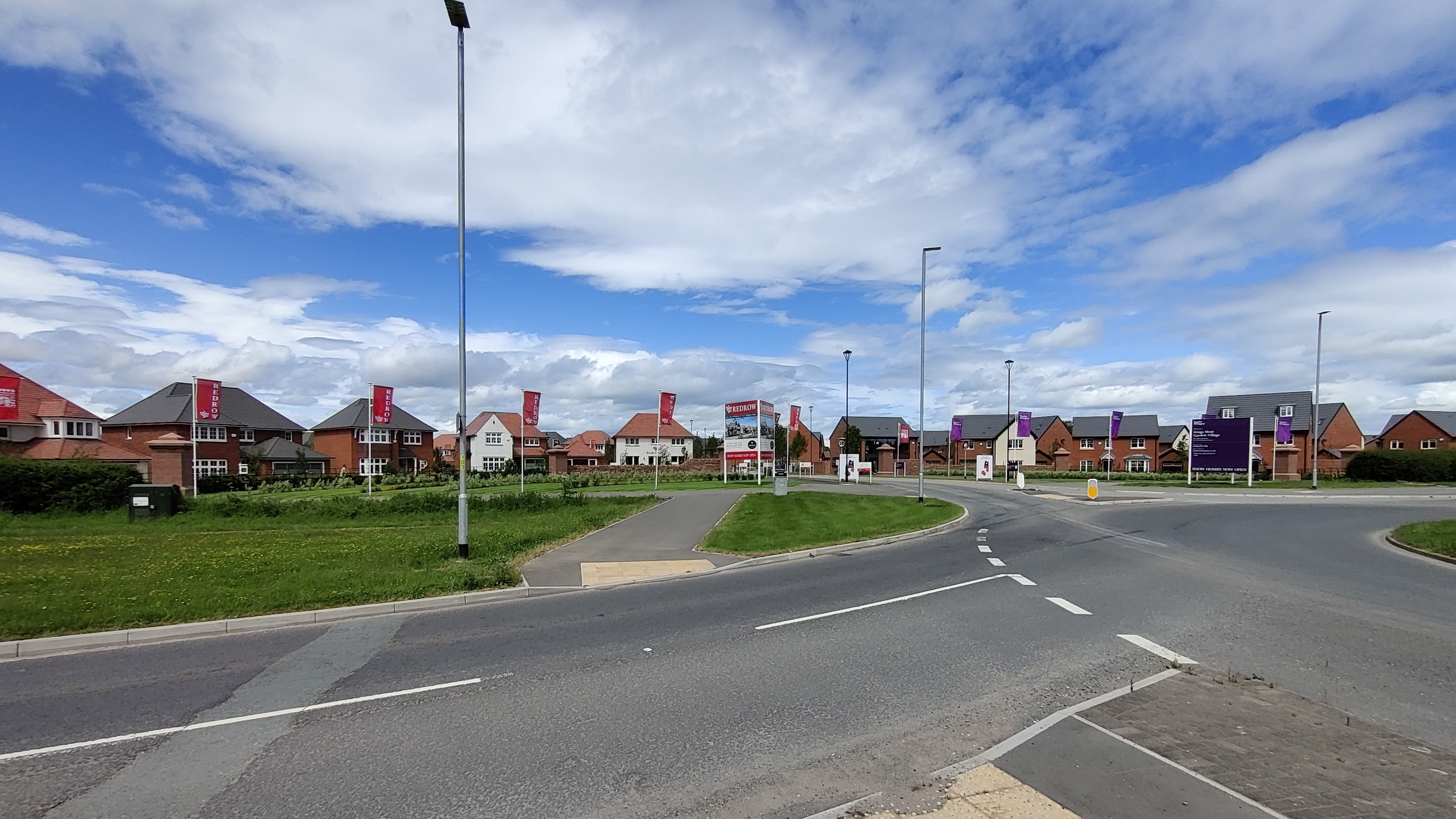
Kings Moat development in June 2021

In January 2019, outline planning permission was granted for a large residential development of approximately 1,300 homes on land to the south of Westminster Park, to be delivered by Redrow and Taylor Wimpey over a projected 14-year period.

The approved scheme includes new neighbourhood facilities such as a local shopping centre with a supermarket, restaurant and public house, a nursery, outdoor play areas and a new primary school, alongside areas of public open space and sports provision.

Construction began in late 2019 following preparatory works, with phased housebuilding continuing through the early 2020s.

By early 2026, a substantial proportion of the development had been completed, with several phases occupied and further housing under construction. Infrastructure works, landscaping and community facilities have continued to be delivered in parallel with residential build-out.

A new primary school, **Kings Moat Community Primary School**, has been constructed within the development and is scheduled to open for pupils in September 2026, providing education provision for families in Westminster Park and the surrounding area.

== Politics ==
=== Local government ===
Westminster Park forms part of the Cheshire West and Chester unitary authority area.

=== British Parliament ===
Following parliamentary boundary changes implemented for the 2024 United Kingdom general election, Westminster Park is located within the Chester South and Eddisbury constituency. The area is represented in the House of Commons by Aphra Brandreth of the Conservative Party.
