= Dorin Park School =

Special school in Cheshire, England

Coordinates: 53.2135°N 2.8868°W

Information
- Established: 1977; 49 years ago
- Department for Education URN: 111511 Tables
- Ofsted: Reports
- Head teacher: Mrs Sarah Adam
- Age: 2 to 19
- Enrollment: 147 (2025)
- Website: www.dorinpark.co.uk

Dorin Park Special School is a school in Upton-by-Chester, Cheshire, for children with a statement for complex special educational needs, aged between 2 and 19 years of age. It has specialist SEN status. The school was opened in 1977. In September 2008, a new community resource centre was built, officially opened in 2010 by football captain Phil Neville. In 2014 the Early Years Foundation Stage department was refurbished to enable the school to host two EYFS groups.

== History ==
The school opened in 1977; the local paper, the Chester Chronicle, said that there had been controversy about the plans for it.
