= Upton-by-Chester High School =

Location
- St James Avenue; Chester, Cheshire, CH2 1NN; England; 53°12′51″N 2°52′13″W

Information
- Type: Foundation school
- Motto: Learning to Shape the Future
- Established: 1968
- Local authority: Cheshire West and Chester
- Department for Education URN: 111422 Tables
- Ofsted: Reports
- Headteacher: Lee Cummins
- Gender: Coeducational
- Age: 11 to 18
- Enrolment: 1700
- Houses: Yunus, Wood, Mendes, Yousafzai, Maathai
- Colours: red, yellow, green, blue, purple
- Website: www.uptonhigh.co.uk

Upton-by-Chester High School is a high school located in Upton-by-Chester, Cheshire. The school opened in the 1960s as a secondary modern before becoming a state-funded coeducational school following the abolition of the tripartite education system in 1968. The current school headmaster is Lee Cummins.

== Site and facilities ==
The school, which is situated on St James Avenue, is divided into seven blocks: A, B, C, D, E, and T. Along with the departmental classrooms, there are science labs, gym, all-weather sports facilities, and dance studio.

The oldest parts of the site, are A Block, T Block, School Hall and gym which were all built in the 1960s. In subsequent decades, further blocks and annexes were added to the school. Due to its age the school was reported to have some of the worst school buildings in the UK. The Department of Education eventually scheduled the school to be rebuilt. In October 2025 the rebuilding program began. A 138,800 sq ft (12,890 m^{2}) U-shaped three-storey building is to be built on the existing playing fields. Existing buildings will be removed and areas converted into sports facilities.

== Students ==
There are approximately 1,700 students on roll, with a maximum of 280 students in each year. There are ten forms in each year who are split into two teams of the year: X Side and Y Side.

== Notable alumni ==
- Andrew Emerton, Bishop of Sherwood
- Tom Hughes, actor
- Tom Heaton, footballer
- Harry Pickering, footballer
