= Mid Cheshire College =

Coordinates: 53.249°N 2.537°W

- Northwich & Winsford

Information
- Type: Academic, vocational
- Enrollment: 9,000
- Campuses: 2
- Website: www.midchesh.ac.uk

Mid Cheshire College was a further education college based in Hartford and Winsford, Cheshire. The college merged with Warrington Collegiate in 2017 to form Warrington and Vale Royal College. It had approximately 9,000 students at the time of the merger.

== Curriculum ==
The college offered a wide variety of academic and vocational courses including BTEC National Diplomas, BTEC First Diplomas and National Vocational Qualifications (NVQ). Subjects included Art & Design, Beauty Therapy, Hospitality & Catering, Public Services and Construction. The college also offered Foundation Degrees accredited by the University of Chester and Manchester Metropolitan University. Subjects included Business, Fashion, ICT, Music Technology and Graphic Design.

The college promoted continuing education through a number a number of adult courses, return-to-work and study courses. The college also awarded Access to Higher Education Diplomas, which enabled adults - with none or few qualifications - the opportunity to go on to study at university.

== Campuses ==
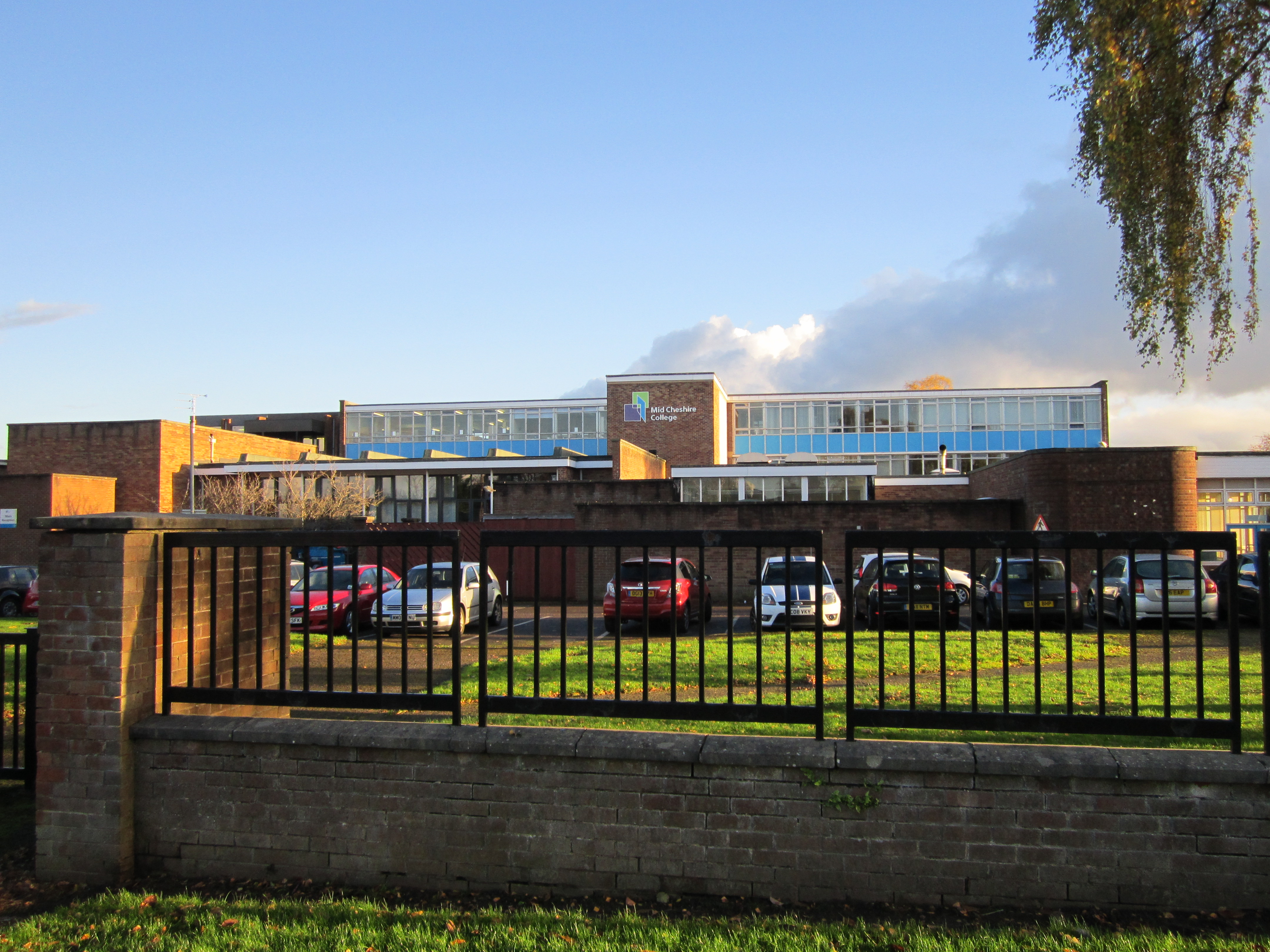
Hartford campus

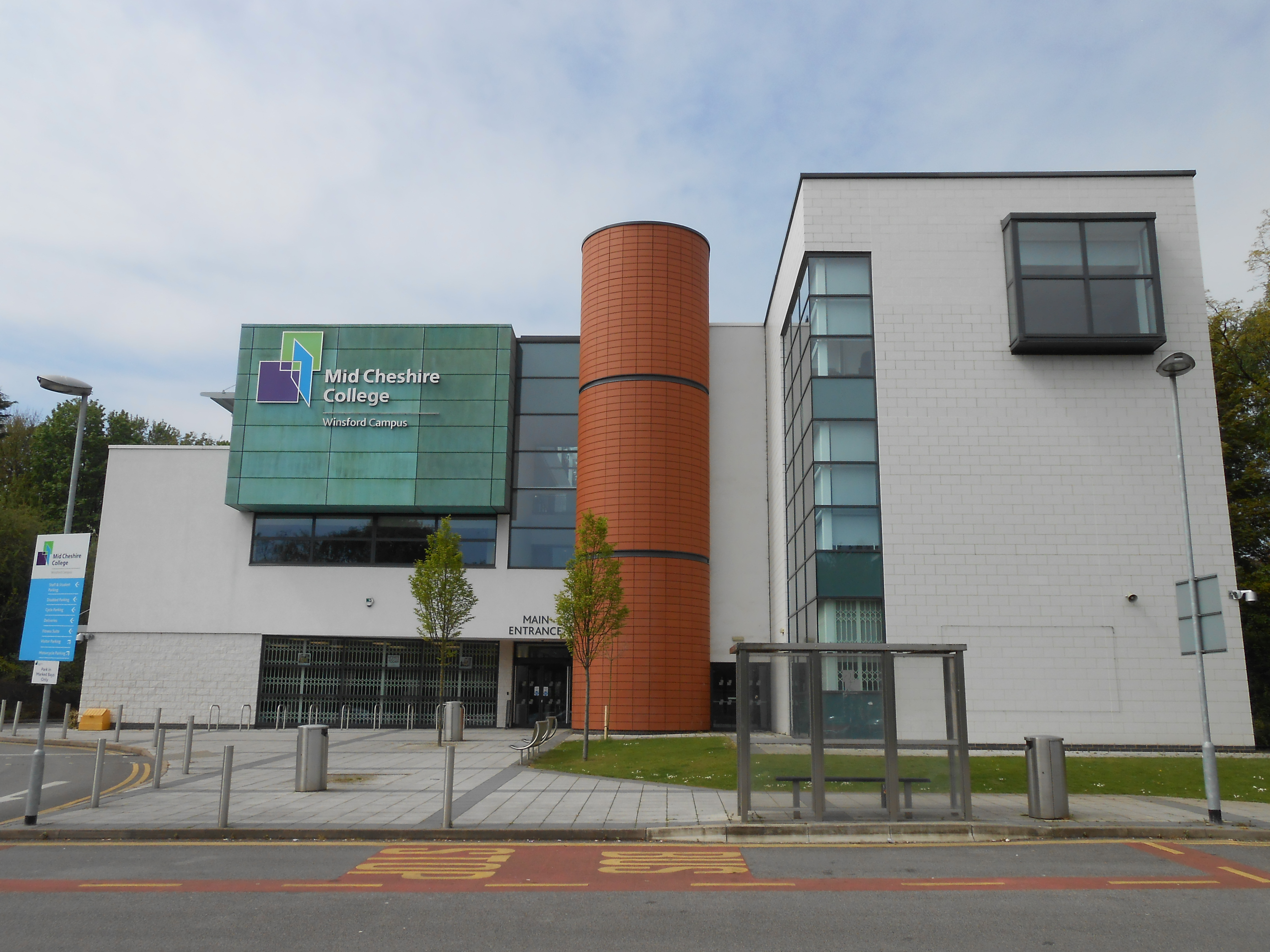
Winsford campus

Mid Cheshire College was based across two main sites:

- Hartford campus, the main campus, located in Hartford, offered courses including Art & Design, Performing Arts, Photography, Fashion, Engineering, Construction, Motor Vehicle, Business, ICT and Travel & Tourism. Beginning in 2008, the college began a large redevelopment of its Hartford campus replacing older buildings this included a new £3.5m Arts and Creative Media Building. In 2012, the Centre of Creative Arts and Sport opened to host sport, fashion, photography, dance, media, music and the performing arts.
- Winsford campus, in 2010 a new £10m campus opened to host courses in health and social care, child care, adult learning, and public uniformed services.

== Closure and redevelopment ==
In September 2018, a year after Mid Cheshire College merged with Warrington Collegiate to form Warrington and Vale Royal College in August 2017, Hartford campus was closed with the loss of 56 jobs. Despite local opposition from the local council, the new college said the decision was because the Hartford campus was ‘seriously under-utilised’. In August 2019, Sports England officially objected to plans to demolish the £7.5million Sports Centre (which opened in 2012) by the housing development company that acquired the former Hartford campus. In March 2020, plans to build 108 homes on the former campus site were passed after Cheshire West and Chester Council planning officers recommended it for approval. However, three years later the developer went to administration leaving the land as an unfinished building site. In 2023, the Weaver Vale MP, Mike Amesbury, who opposed the development, demanded action from the local government and Government agency Homes England.
