= Countess of Chester Hospital =

- Countess of Chester Hospital NHS Foundation Trust

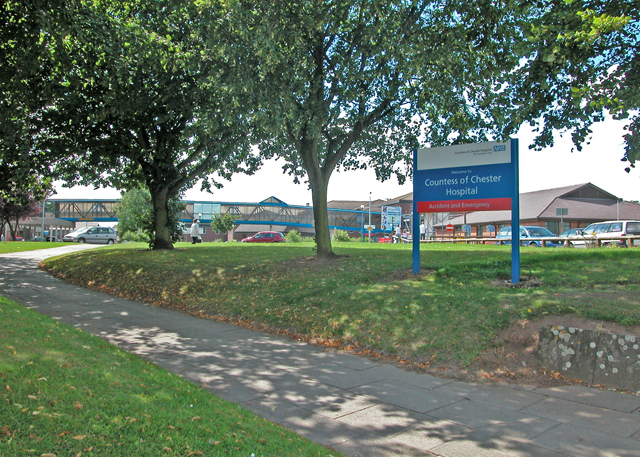
- Pedestrian entrance to Countess of Chester Hospital, Liverpool Road, Chester

- Location in Cheshire

Geography
- Location: Chester, Cheshire, England, United Kingdom
- Coordinates: 53°12′31″N 2°53′55″W

Organisation
- Care system: Public NHS
- Type: District General
- Affiliated university: University of Liverpool School of Medicine; University of Chester; Swansea University School of Medicine

Services
- Emergency department: Yes Accident & Emergency
- Beds: 625

History
- Founded: 1829 Cheshire Lunatic Asylum; 1968 West Cheshire Hospital; 1984 Countess of Chester Hospital

Links
- Website: www.coch.nhs.uk
- Lists: Hospitals in England

The Countess of Chester Hospital is the main NHS hospital for the English city of Chester and the surrounding area. It currently has 625 beds, general medical departments and a 24-hour accident and emergency unit. It is managed by the Countess of Chester Hospital NHS Foundation Trust, one of the first Foundation Trusts in the UK, formed in 2004. Cardiac rehabilitation services at the hospital are provided by Cheshire and Wirral Partnership NHS Foundation Trust.

Lucy Letby, a nurse who worked at the hospital, was convicted in August 2023 of murdering seven babies at the neonatal ward between June 2015 and June 2016.

== History ==
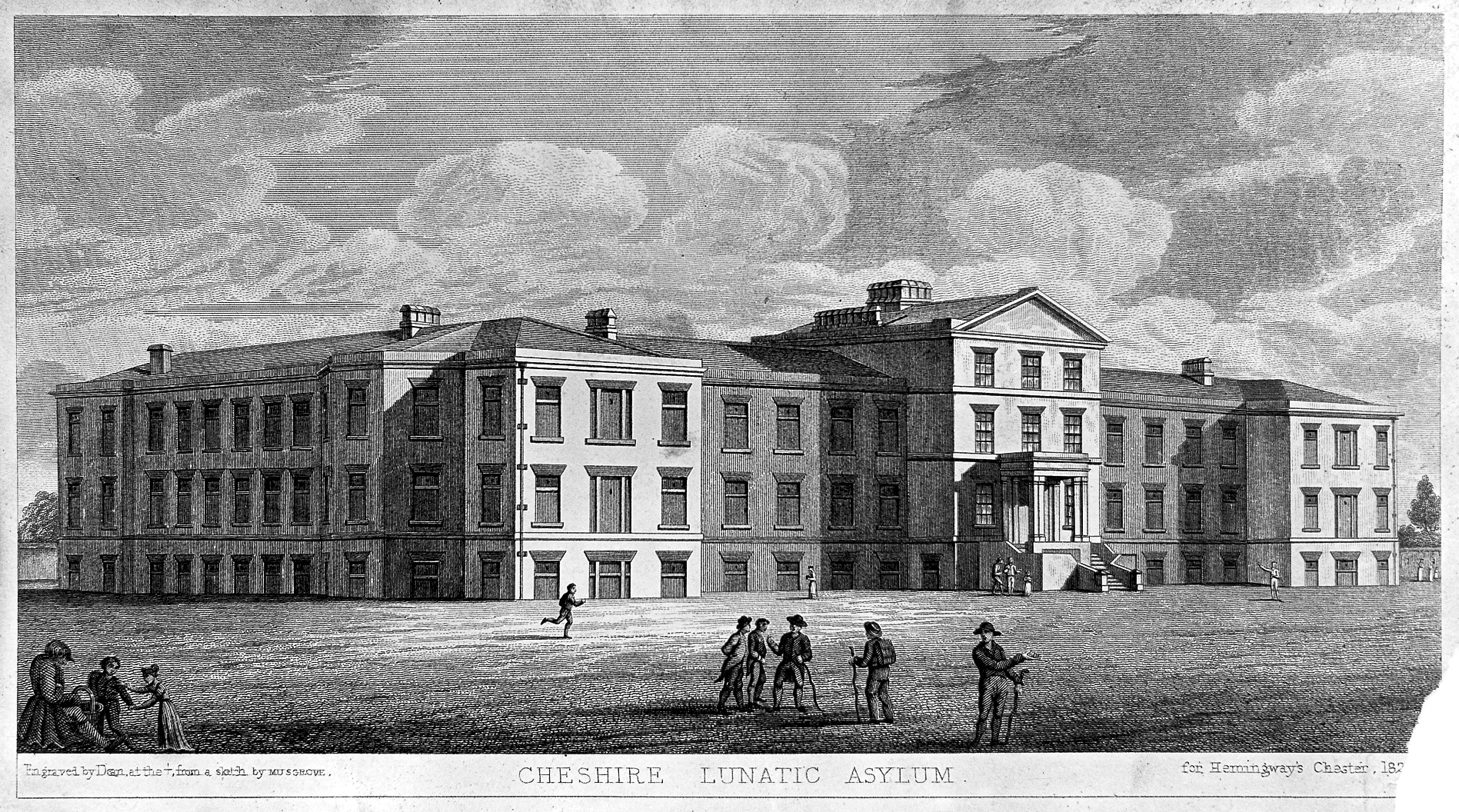
Cheshire Lunatic Asylum, engraving by Dean after Musgrove

The hospital has its origins in the "Cheshire Lunatic Asylum" which opened on part of the site in 1829. The name of the facility changed to "County Mental Hospital" in 1921, to the "Upton Mental Hospital" on joining the National Health Service in 1948, and then to the "Deva Hospital" in 1950.

By 1948, Chester Royal Infirmary specialized in surgery and out-patients and the City Hospital, Hoole, in chronic illnesses, chest, maternity, paediatric, and general medical cases. Pre-war plans for the expansion of the Infirmary were eventually revived. In 1963 a large out-patient and casualty department was opened at the infirmary; this was accompanied with the completion of the Chester inner ring road in 1967. However, after the creation of the West Cheshire HMC (hospital management committee), a fresh decision was taken to focus all the hospital services for the district at a purpose-built site on Liverpool Road, adjacent to the county mental hospital facilities.

In 1968, the new site was renamed the "West Cheshire Hospital". The maternity unit at the City Hospital was transferred to a new building at the south end of the site in 1971. With the opening of a new general wing and A&E department in 1983, several surgical departments from the Royal Infirmary were relocated to the new buildings. On 30 May 1984, West Cheshire Hospital was officially renamed the Countess of Chester Hospital by Charles and Diana, then the Prince and Princess of Wales and also Earl and Countess of Chester. In 1993, the Royal Infirmary site was closed after its remaining departments were transferred to the Countess. The City Hospital, which had become a 120-bed geriatric unit, was closed in 1994 after its services were taken over by the Countess in 1991.

In January 2006, the CARE building, sometimes known as Outpatients Four, opened and started providing new facilities the Cardiac Catheter Laboratory, Department of Clinical Audiology, Renal & Urology Department and ENT Department.

In 2007, the Countess of Chester became the first hospital in the UK to completely ban smoking for both workers and patients. In April 2014 a new two-storey wing was opened containing a state of the art 21 bed Intensive Care Unit on the first floor, replacing the old HDU and ITU wards. On the ground floor is an expanded endoscopy unit and the bariatric outpatients department.

In January 2026, the Countess of Chester NHS Trust's chief executive from September 2018 to December 2022, Dr Susan Gilby, was awarded £1.4 million in damages for unfair dismissal. She had been suspended in December 2022 without explanation after she had accused the trust's chairman of bullying and harassment. The employment tribunal found that the trust had "built up a sham case" against her. The trust rejected offers for settlement before going to tribunal, leading to total costs to the trust of about £3 million.

=== Lucy Letby case ===
In August 2023, Lucy Letby, a neonatal nurse who had worked at the hospital several years earlier, was found guilty on seven charges of murder and seven charges of attempted murder following a lengthy trial over the collapses and deaths of babies who were being cared for on the hospital's neonatal ward during 2015 and 2016. The jury concluded that Letby carried out the attacks by injecting babies with air or insulin, overfeeding them and physically assaulting them with medical equipment. This explanation has been disputed by some experts, who argued that the deaths and collapses happened due to natural causes, with inadequate conditions and staffing levels in the neonatal ward being a possible factor.

The trust came under scrutiny following Letby's conviction as it was revealed management had protected Letby when consultants at the neonatal unit expressed their suspicions asked them to remove her from frontline duties. She was not removed from frontline duties until the summer of 2016, and remained on clerical duties until her initial arrest in July 2018. Hospital management did not report their suspicions to the police until May 2017, despite claiming that they were already having their suspicions about her conduct some 18 months earlier.

The ward was downgraded following the final suspicious deaths and collapses in summer 2016, with higher dependency babies no longer being treated there.

On 4 October 2023, Cheshire Constabulary announced an investigation into corporate manslaughter at the Countess of Chester Hospital. On 1 July 2025 three people who were "part of the senior leadership team" were arrested on suspicion of gross negligence manslaughter. They have been released on police bail, pending further inquiries.

The report of the Thirlwall Inquiry was published on 15 September 2026.

== Services ==
Part of the old mental health hospital building, now called the 1829 Building, serves as headquarters for West Cheshire Clinical Commissioning Group, Cheshire and Wirral Partnership NHS Foundation Trust, and various other NHS support organisations. The Bowmere mental health hospital is on the same site, as is Ancora House, a purpose-built Child and Adolescent Mental Health Services unit.

In April 2019, it announced that it would no longer provide elective treatment for Welsh patients because the Welsh government were not prepared to pay the full costs. The Welsh government have not increased the tariff for NHS procedures in line with NHS England, so the trust is paid about 8% less for patients from Wales. Rising waiting lists mean the trust can increase the work it does for English patients, which is more remunerative.

== Performance ==
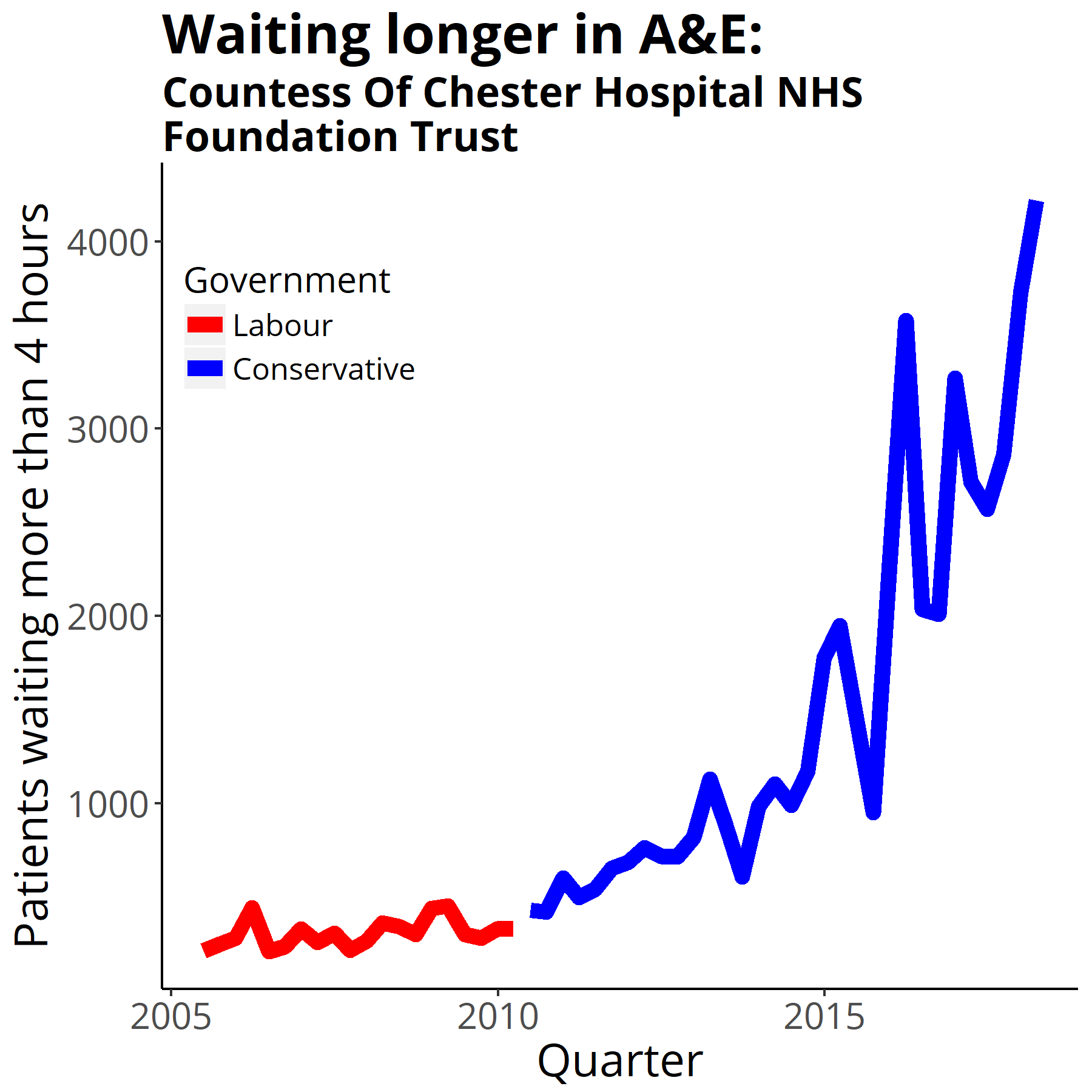
Four-hour target in the emergency department quarterly figures from NHS England Data

Before becoming a foundation trust in 2004, the trust received top 3-star rating in the former national performance charts. In 2016, the CQC rated the hospital as requiring improvement.

The Trust lost the contract for sexual health services when Cheshire West and Chester Council awarded it to East Cheshire NHS Trust in December 2014. From 2015 to 2016 the trust cancelled urgent operations 37 times – the highest number of any NHS trust in England.

On 15 June 2022, the BBC published an article stating that the Care Quality Commission inspection found that the maternity unit was unsafe with problems in adequately trained staff and suitable equipment they also found that in 2021 there five patients had major haemorrhages after giving birth at the hospital, resulting in a need for unplanned hysterectomies.

On 8 August 2025, the CQC issued an urgent warning notice to the hospital after inspectors found repeated inadequacies in its emergency care unit, including "critical gaps" in sepsis treatment, and the routine provision of patient care in corridors. The unit was rated inadequate requiring improvement.

== See also ==
- Chapel at the Countess of Chester Hospital
- List of NHS trusts
- Listed buildings in Upton-by-Chester
