= Dale Barracks =

Military installation in England

- Chester

Site information
- Type: Barracks
- Owner: Ministry of Defence
- Operator: British Army

Location
- Location within Cheshire
- Coordinates: 53°13′31″N 02°53′42″W

Site history
- Built: 1939
- In use: 1939–1956; 1987–Present

Dale Barracks is a British Army base at Moston near Chester, England. It is home to the 2nd Battalion, Royal Yorkshire Regiment.

== History ==
The barracks are situated in the grounds of Moston Hall, a house built in 1789 for Richard Massey. The house was acquired by the Swetenham family who sold it to the Lockett family in 1918. During the First World War, the house was used as a military hospital.

The rest of the site was occupied by a house known as The Dale which was built in the 1880s and was bought by the War Office in 1938. The Dale became the depot of the Cheshire Regiment who arrived from Chester Castle in 1939.

During the Second World War, the Machine Gun Training Centre was established here. After the war, it became a Primary Training Centre for the Infantry.

Between 1956 and 1987, it was part of Western Command and home to 165 Western Command Provost Company (RMP); part of the Dale was also used for civilian purposes as a secure asylum before it was returned to military use as the officer's mess for the barracks of the 1st Battalion the King's Regiment.

The 1st Battalion Royal Welsh moved out of the barracks in April 2014, and the 2nd Battalion Mercian Regiment arrived in July 2014. The 2nd Battalion Mercian Regiment then left in Summer 2018 and was replaced by 1st Battalion The Duke of Lancaster's Regiment, which arrived in November 2018. The 1st Battalion Duke of Lancaster's Regiment left the barracks in August 2022, moving to Episkopi. They will be based at Weeton Barracks on their return to the UK.

After returning from Episkopi, the 2nd Battalion, Royal Yorkshire Regiment was based here at Dale Barracks from summer 2022 until summer 2024, when it moved to Battlesbury Barracks in Warminster.

In July 2024, 22 Multi-Role Medical Regiment moved from Keogh Barracks to Dale Barracks.

== Future ==
In November 2016, the Ministry of Defence announced that the site would close in 2023. This was later extended to 2030.
