= Lache =

Housing estate in Chester, England

Coordinates: 53.174038°N 2.921545°W

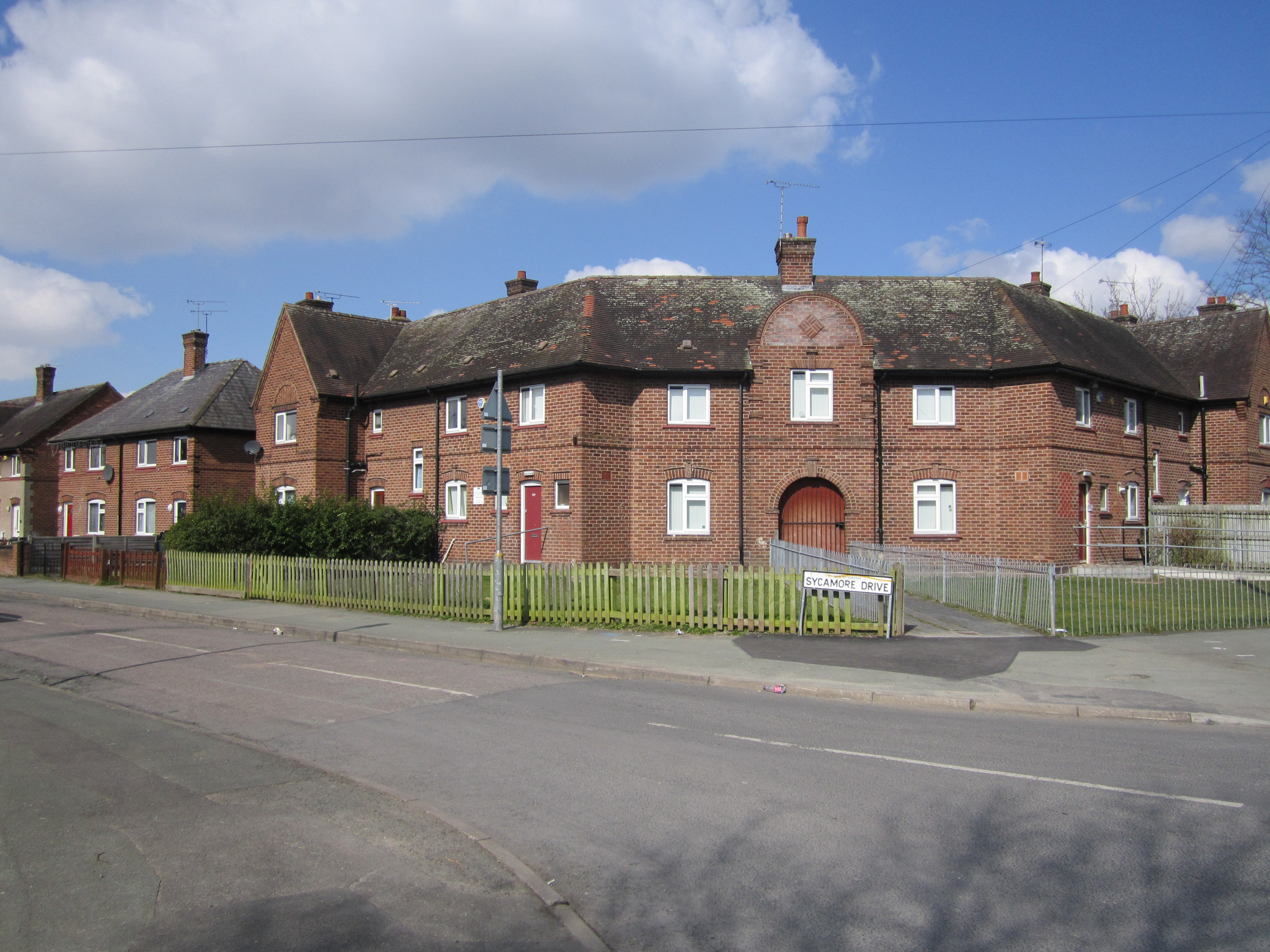
- Sycamore Drive, Lache, Chester

- Location within Cheshire
- Population: 5,760 (2011 Ward)
- OS grid reference: SJ385645
- Unitary authority: Cheshire West and Chester
- Ceremonial county: Cheshire
- Region: North West
- Country: England
- Sovereign state: United Kingdom
- Post town: CHESTER
- Postcode district: CH4
- Dialling code: 01244
- Police: Cheshire
- Fire: Cheshire
- Ambulance: North West
- UK Parliament: Chester South and Eddisbury

The Lache (/leɪtʃ/ LAYTCH;) is a housing estate in the city of Chester, Cheshire, England. It is located approximately 2 miles (3 km) south-west of the city centre, close to the border with Saltney, and runs almost continuously into Westminster Park. The main thoroughfares through the estate are Cliveden Road and Sycamore Drive.

== Etymology ==
The name Lache is thought to derive from the Old English words loecc or lacu, meaning water, suggesting that the area was historically associated with nearby water or marshland. A similar etymology is found in the nearby Cheshire village of Shocklach.

== Facilities ==
The Lache contains a range of local facilities, including two churches: St Mark's Church (Church of England) on St Mark’s Road and St Clare’s Roman Catholic Church on Downsfield Road. The estate includes a small shopping area with an off-licence, hairdresser, bakery, food bank and newsagent.

There are two primary schools serving the area: Lache Primary School and St Clare’s Catholic Primary School, with shared sports facilities between them. Additional community amenities include a branch library, a large community centre and hall, several playgroups and a youth club.

Proposals for a new railway station to serve The Lache have been discussed in local transport planning documents, though no confirmed timetable or funding has been announced as of 2026.

== Politics ==
=== Local government ===
The Lache forms part of the Cheshire West and Chester unitary authority area.

=== British Parliament ===
Following parliamentary boundary changes implemented for the 2024 United Kingdom general election, The Lache lies within the Chester South and Eddisbury constituency. The area is represented in the House of Commons by Aphra Brandreth of the Conservative Party.
