= World War Zoo gardens =

World War Zoo gardens is a research project and recreation of a wartime "dig for victory" garden, created at Newquay Zoo in 2009 based on those created in many a zoo and botanic garden throughout Britain and Europe during and after World War II. The gardens project won a BIAZA national zoo award in November 2011.

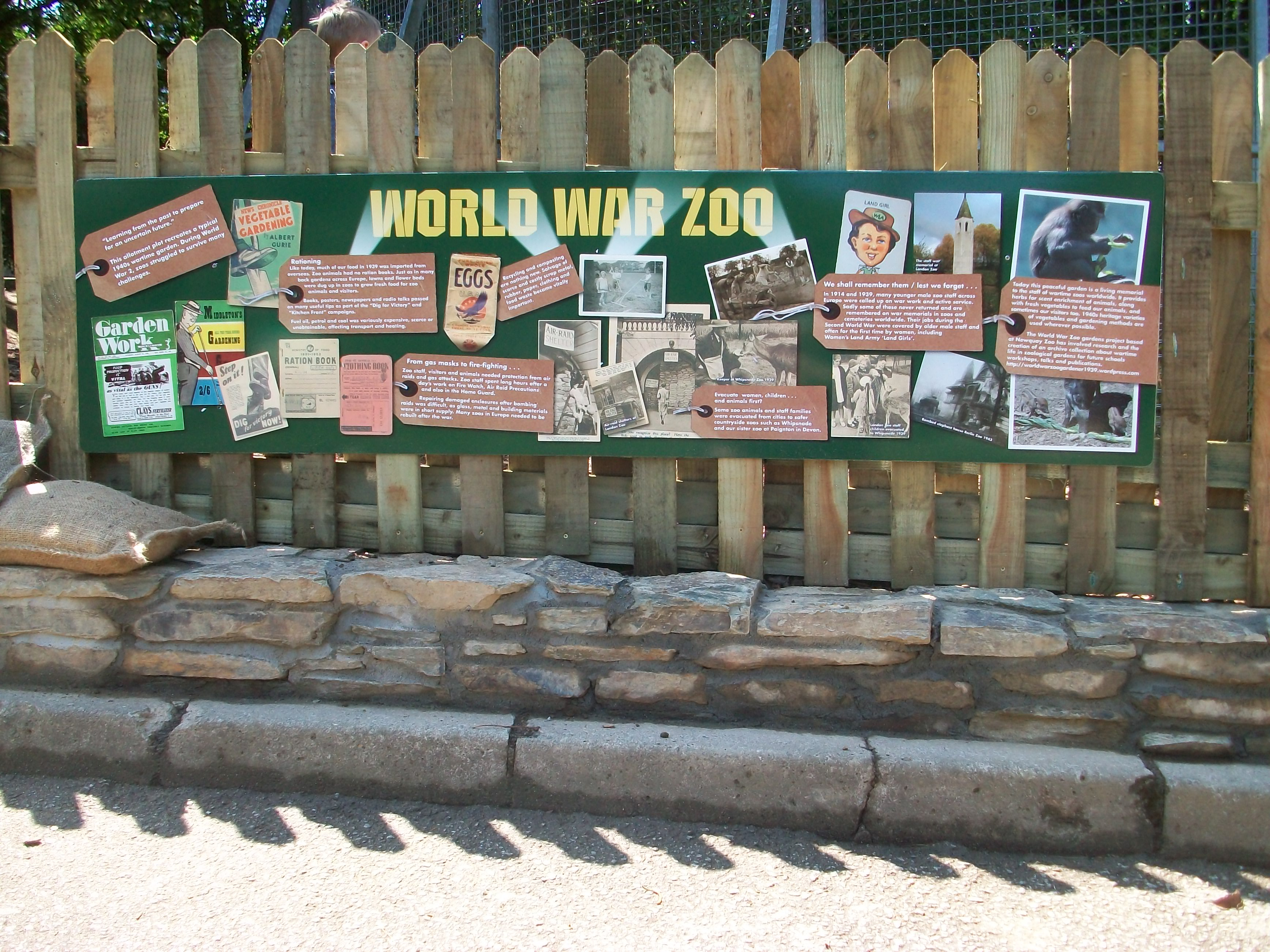
World War Zoo gardens graphics sign, Newquay Zoo, 2011

== Aims of the World War Zoo Gardens project ==
The project investigates the similarities through creating an allotment of how zoos and people will deal with future resource shortages such as peak oil, food miles, climate change, sustainability, composting and recycling compared with the original wartime resource shortages of fuel rationing, food rationing and government salvage drives in many countries around the world. Food grown on the plot is used for animal feeding and scent enrichment, something also practised on a large scale in the market garden at Durrell Wildlife Park and the Verti-Crop automated hydroponics polytunnel at Paignton Zoo.

A similar comparative study project of learning lessons for climate change, peak oil, food and fuel security and resource shortage from the 1940s, known as "The New Home Front" has been set up in 2011 by UK Green Party MP Caroline Lucas.

The World War Zoo garden was launched in 2009 at Newquay Zoo on the 70th anniversary of the outbreak of war on 3 September 1939 when zoos as places of entertainment across Britain were closed and some animals euthanized (in response to expected air raids). Research is heavily based on archive accounts in newspapers and official histories and memoirs of staff at zoos such as London Zoo, Chester Zoo, Chessington Zoo, Maidstone Zoo (Closed. Was located at TQ 745 588.), Bristol Zoo, Dudley Zoo, Edinburgh Zoo, Whipsnade, Belle Vue Zoo (now closed) and Paignton Zoo, sister zoo to the project headquarters at Newquay Zoo.

London Zoo keepers helped to set up Pig Clubs, feeding and fattening livestock on food scraps including the London police pig club, run in the empty cages of ZSL Regent's Park London Zoo, the usual occupants having been evacuated to Whipsnade. Zoo staff at London Zoo planted a 10 pole plot allotment with tomato seeds sent from America and also hosted a National Wartime Utility farm and garden exhibition was set up at ZSL London Zoo, entitled the "Off The Ration" Exhibition to encourage visitors to grow their own crops and livestock.

The Imperial War Museum exhibition in London in 2010 called Ministry of Food and the exhibition book covered the background subjects.

World War Zoo Gardens won a BIAZA British zoo award for best use of plants in 2011 recognising the educational and animal enrichment role of the allotment plot.

== Zoos and Botanic Gardens in Wartime Britain World War I ==
To coincide with the 1914 centenary, the remit of their research has extended to the impact of World War I on zoos and their associated botanic gardens. Zoos and gardens saw many of their male staff enlist or conscripted into the armed forces or munitions work, with many casualties. Female staff were used for the first time as temporary replacements, a practice repeated again in World War II.

== Zoo and botanic garden war memorials ==
Zoo staff war memorials exist at ZSL London Zoo and Manchester's Belle Vue Zoo (closed 1978). The Belle Vue zoo staff war memorial in Gorton Cemetery in Manchester is now badly damaged.

Botanic gardens such as Kew have their own staff memorials. A further list of staff casualty names from World War II were added at Kew Gardens and ZSL London Zoo after World War II.

== Zoos in Wartime Britain World War II ==
Zoos in Britain endured several weeks of closure in September 1939 like many places of entertainment. ARP Air Raid Precautions were put in place. There was also evacuation of staff and animals to quieter country areas such Chessington Zoo going to Paignton or Primley Zoo in Devon or ZSL London Zoo animals and families going to ZSL Whipsnade Zoo. However, some zoos reopened after two weeks or more as a morale booster and to support zoo finances. The expected air raids did not happen until the Blitz of Autumn 1940, followed by further bombing raids and V1 and V2 rocket damage in 1944.

Belfast Zoo was affected by the Belfast Blitz of 1941, leading to larger animals being put down to avoid escape during air raids. Others such as Sheila the elephant were moved nightly home to the suburbs by staff.

Zoological collections struggled with shortages, rationing and restrictions on everything from fuel and food to building materials for repairs such as glass. Innovative solutions to building shortages at Chester Zoo by George Mottershead included buying wartime surplus pill boxes and tank traps in 1944 in order to repair and build new enclosures.

Many zoo staff were called up, enlisted or drafted as in World War I leading to limited employment of female zoo keepers on large scale for the first time, including Women's Land Army Land Girls. June Mottershead the daughter of Chester Zoo founder published her wartime memoirs in 2008 (with Janice Batten) as Reared in Chester Zoo.

War memorials at ZSL Regent's Park London Zoo and Belle Vue Zoo [now closed] list the names of a few of the many zoo staff killed on active service in World War I and World War II.

A historical collection of wartime artifacts has been added to the Newquay Zoo archive to illustrate elements of everyday life for zoo staff, zoo animals, zoo families (including children evacuated to zoos in the countryside) and zoo visitors of the time.

Similar resource problems existed for zoos across Europe and around the world, with no animal collecting trips or exchanges on breeding loan, limited food resources and difficulties dealing with air raid and fire damage to enclosures.

== German and European Zoos during World War II and Nazi Germany ==
Some zoos in Germany such as Berlin Zoo and Dresden Zoo were badly damaged during Allied air raids in 1944. Other zoos such as Warsaw Zoo and Budapest Zoo were effectively destroyed during fighting and rebuilt after the war.

== "Dig For Victory" gardens ==
"Dig for Victory" gardens were encouraged by many governments, including the famous 1941 Ministry of Food campaign in Britain, supported by propaganda by Lord Woolton as Minister of Food and radio broadcasts by radio gardeners such as C. H. Middleton. Many of the wartime gardening publications and also cookery books by famous chefs such as Marguerite Patten have been used to research varieties and food uses at the time.

In the US the equivalent of the British Dig For Victory campaign was called a Victory garden, an echo of those from World War 1, which sprang up across America as a patriotic duty after the attack on Pearl Harbor in December 1941, to help with rationing which was brought throughout the US during 1942.

As part of the Global Plant Conservation Strategy and Global Plant Conservation Day adopted in many botanic gardens, especially members of Botanic Gardens Conservation International BGCI, period varieties of fruit and vegetables are being grown after research into surviving 1940s varieties.
