= Motty =

Individual hybrid elephant

- Breed: (African elephant–Asian elephant hybrid)
- Sex: Male
- Born: 11 July 1978; Chester Zoo, Cheshire, England
- Died: 21 July 1978 (aged 10 days); Chester Zoo, Cheshire, England
- Parents: Jumbolino (father); Sheba (mother)
- Named after: George Mottershead

Motty (11 July – 21 July 1978) was the only proven hybrid between an Asian and an African elephant. The male calf was born in Chester Zoo to Asian mother Sheba and African father Jumbolino. He was named after George Mottershead, who founded the Chester Zoo in 1931.

== Appearance ==
Motty's head and ears were morphologically like Loxodonta (African), while the toenail numbers, with five on the front feet and four on the hind, were that of Elephas (Asian). The trunk had a single trunk finger as seen in Elephas but the trunk length was more similar to Loxodonta. His vertebral column showed an Loxodonta profile above the shoulders transitioning to the convex hump profile of Elephas below the shoulders.

== Cause of death ==
Due to being born six weeks early, Motty was considered underweight by 27 kg (60 lb). Despite intensive human care, Motty died of an umbilical infection 10 days after his birth on 21 July. The necropsy revealed death to be due to necrotizing enterocolitis and E. coli septicaemia present in both his colon and the umbilical cord.

== Preservation ==
His body was preserved by a private company, and is a mounted specimen at the Natural History Museum in London.

== Other elephantid hybrids ==
African forest elephants and African bush elephants are known to hybridize with each other where their ranges overlap. Analysis of nuclear genomes reconstructed from ancient DNA indicates that members of the extinct elephant genus Palaeoloxodon, including the European straight-tusked elephant had significant (>30%) introgressed ancestry from African forest elephants and to a lesser extent mammoths. Genetic evidence suggests that the North American Columbian mammoth was the result of hybrization between two different mammoth populations, with woolly mammoths and Columbian mammoths sometimes hybridizing during the Late Pleistocene in North America.

== See also ==
- List of individual elephants
