= Chester Zoo monorail =

Transport system at Chester Zoo in England

Coordinates: 53.22685°N 2.882°W

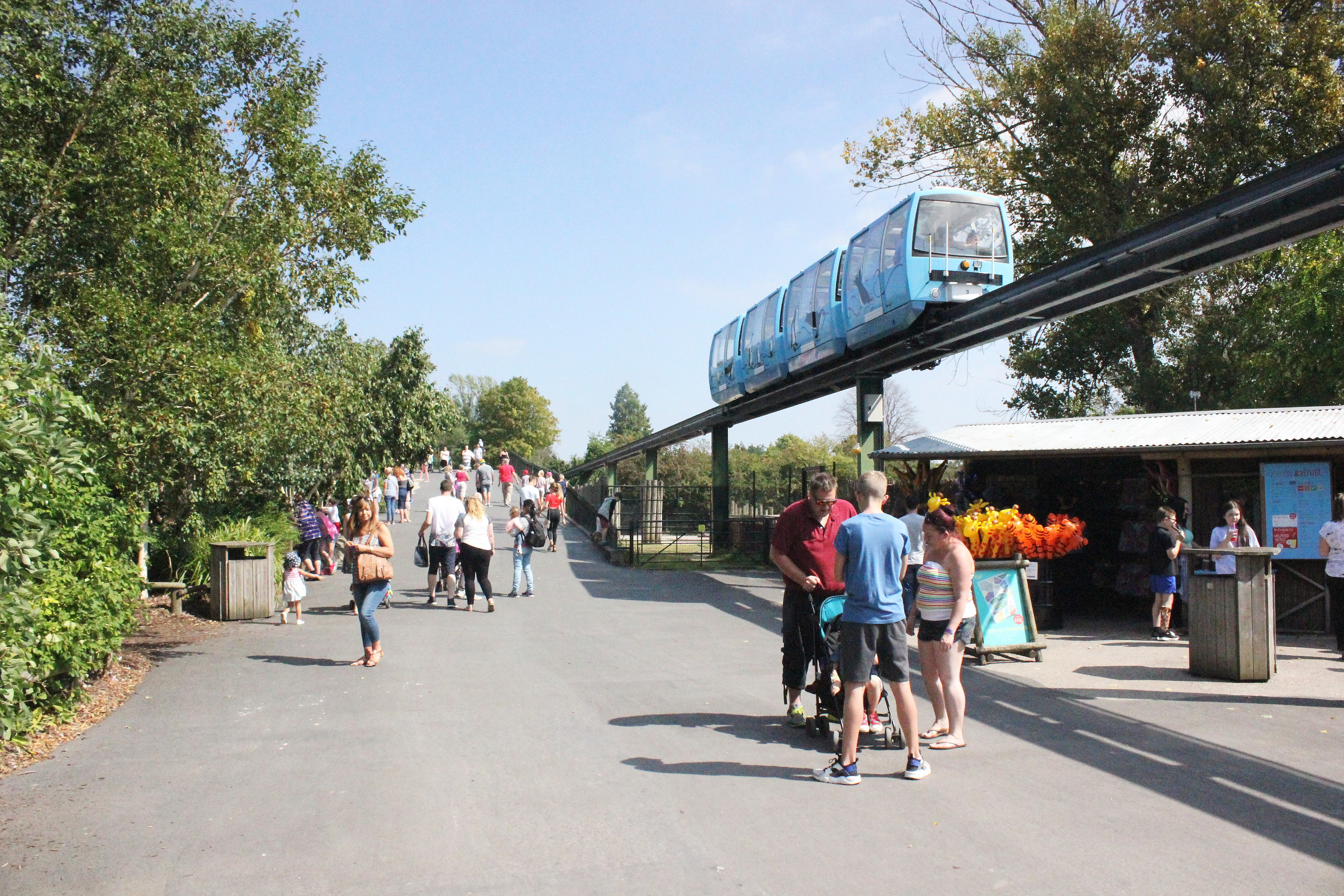
The Chester Zoo monorail

The Chester Zoo monorail was an internal transport system at Chester Zoo that operated from 1991 to 2019.

== Description ==
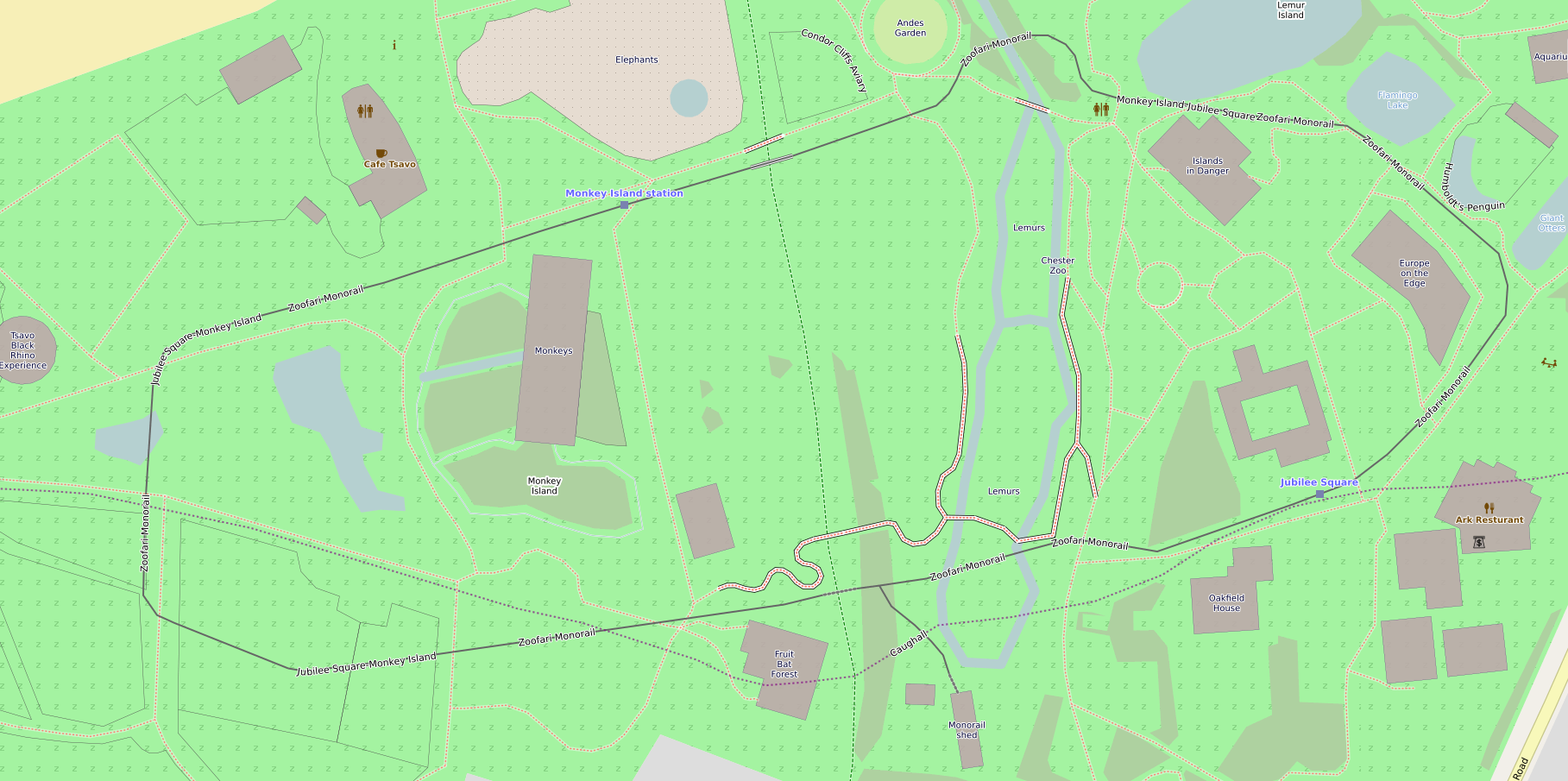
Map showing monorail in 2012

The system was 1.4 kilometres (0.9 miles) long and travelled on a single track elevated guideway, a straddle beam monorail, to give views of the zoo grounds – the track crossed Flag Lane twice on its one-way circular route. The two halves of the zoo were connected by the system and there was one station in each part, one near the lion enclosure (Jubilee Square station) and one near the monkey building (Tsavo station, formerly known as Monkey Island station from 1991 until 2015).

The system operated four trains. Each train on the system could seat 24 passengers between its four cars and a full tour took around fifteen minutes. The layout had a separate depot and control room and carried approximately 2,000 passengers per day.

T&M Machine Tool Electronics upgraded the monorail's drive system and electrics in 2009, including conversion from DC to AC electrical operation and automation improvements involving the laying of over 25 miles (40 km) of cabling, at a cost of £300,000. The upgraded system used pairs of 2.2-kilowatt (3 hp) AC motors for each carriage, with remote monitoring managed over a 5 GHz wireless link.

== History ==
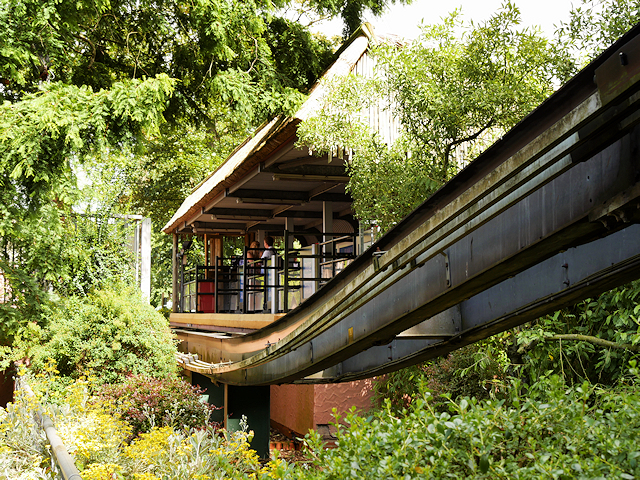
Jubilee Square station in 2016

The monorail was built and installed by Computerised People Mover International at a cost of $4 million and then opened by the Duchess of Kent in 1991. During its first trip around the zoo, the train suddenly broke down while the Duchess was still on it.

Following the major improvements in 2009, the monorail was re-launched by music producer Pete Waterman during a visit on 23 July 2009, when Waterman drove the first loop of the new system. One week later a power failure occurred, requiring the first eight visitors of the day to be escorted off the monorail using a hydraulic lift.

On 17 May 2012, Queen Elizabeth II and Prince Philip took a tour of Chester Zoo in a specially redecorated monorail set painted in a Union Flag theme for their Diamond Jubilee tour of the north-west of England.

About 2017, Redcroft Management Ltd conducted a "Monorail Future Options Appraisal & Viability Assessment" project to evaluate the commercial and practical viability of extending, replacing or closing the monorail, with options of funding by the North of England Zoological Society.

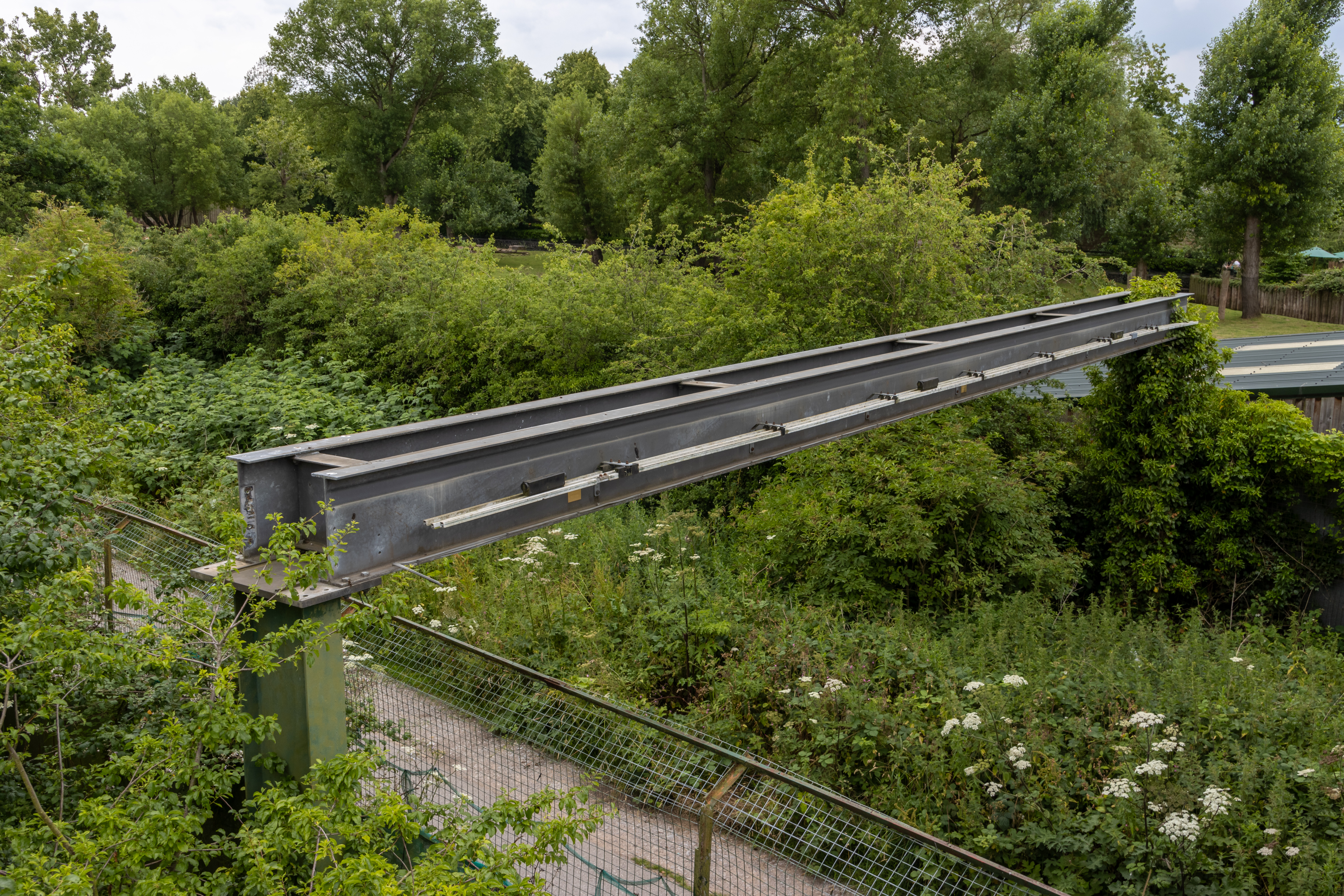
The remains of the monorail in 2023

In June 2019, Chester Zoo announced that it would be closing the monorail as it had become unreliable and now covered less than half the zoo because of expansion to over 125 acres (51 ha). The zoo also stated that it "no longer fits our vision for a world-class modern zoo". The system closed on 3 September 2019.

== List of trains ==
Train no.	Image	Paint theme	Theme years	Notes
1		Blue band on white	1991 – 2010	
1		Giraffe coat	2010 - 2016	
1		Elephants	2016 – 2019	
2		Green band on white	1991 - 2010	
2		Snake skin	2010 – 2016	
2		Cheetah	2016 - 2019	
3		Yellow band on white	1991 – 2010	
3		Zebra coat	2010 – 2012	
3		Union Jacks	2012 – 2016	The royal visitors used this train on 17 May 2012. It was repainted in this theme to commemorate this.
3		Penguins	2016 – 2019	
4		Red band on white	1991 - 2010	
4		Tiger coat	2010 - 2016	
4		Ants	2016 – 2019	
