= Chester Zoo =

Zoo in Upton-by-Chester, Chester, England

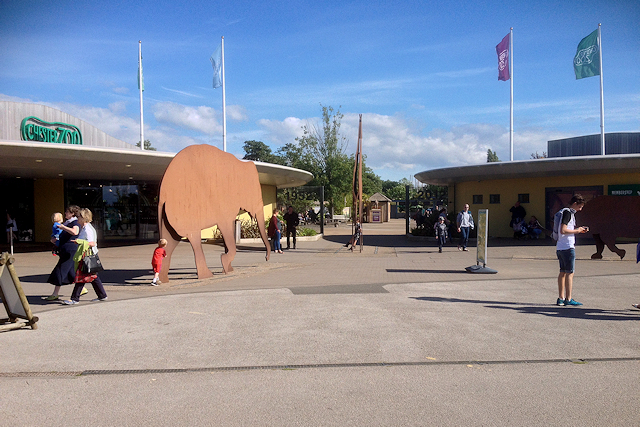
- Main Zoo Entrance
- Interactive map of Chester Zoo
- 53°13′36″N 2°53′3″W
- Date opened: 1931
- Location: Upton-by-Chester, Cheshire, England
- Land area: 51 hectares (130 acres)
- No. of animals: 35,000+
- No. of species: 500+
- Annual visitors: 1,971,178
- Major exhibits: Monsoon Forest, Islands, Heart of Africa, Mkomazi National Park Painted Dogs Conserve, Elephants of the Asian Forest, Realm of the Red Ape, Tsavo Black Rhino Experience, Spirit of the Jaguar
- Website: https://www.chesterzoo.org

Chester Zoo is a zoo in Upton-by-Chester, Cheshire, England. Chester Zoo was opened in 1931 by George Mottershead and his family. The zoo is one of the UK's largest zoos at 51 hectares (130 acres) and the zoo has a total land holding of approximately 160 hectares (400 acres).

Chester Zoo is operated by the North of England Zoological Society, a registered charity founded in 1934. The zoo receives no government funding and is the most-visited wildlife attraction in Britain with more than 2 million visitors in 2019. In 2007 Forbes described the zoo as one of the fifteen best zoos in the world. In 2017 and more recently, 2024, the zoo was named as the best zoo in the UK and as also regarded as the third best in the world by TripAdvisor.

== History ==
=== Early history ===
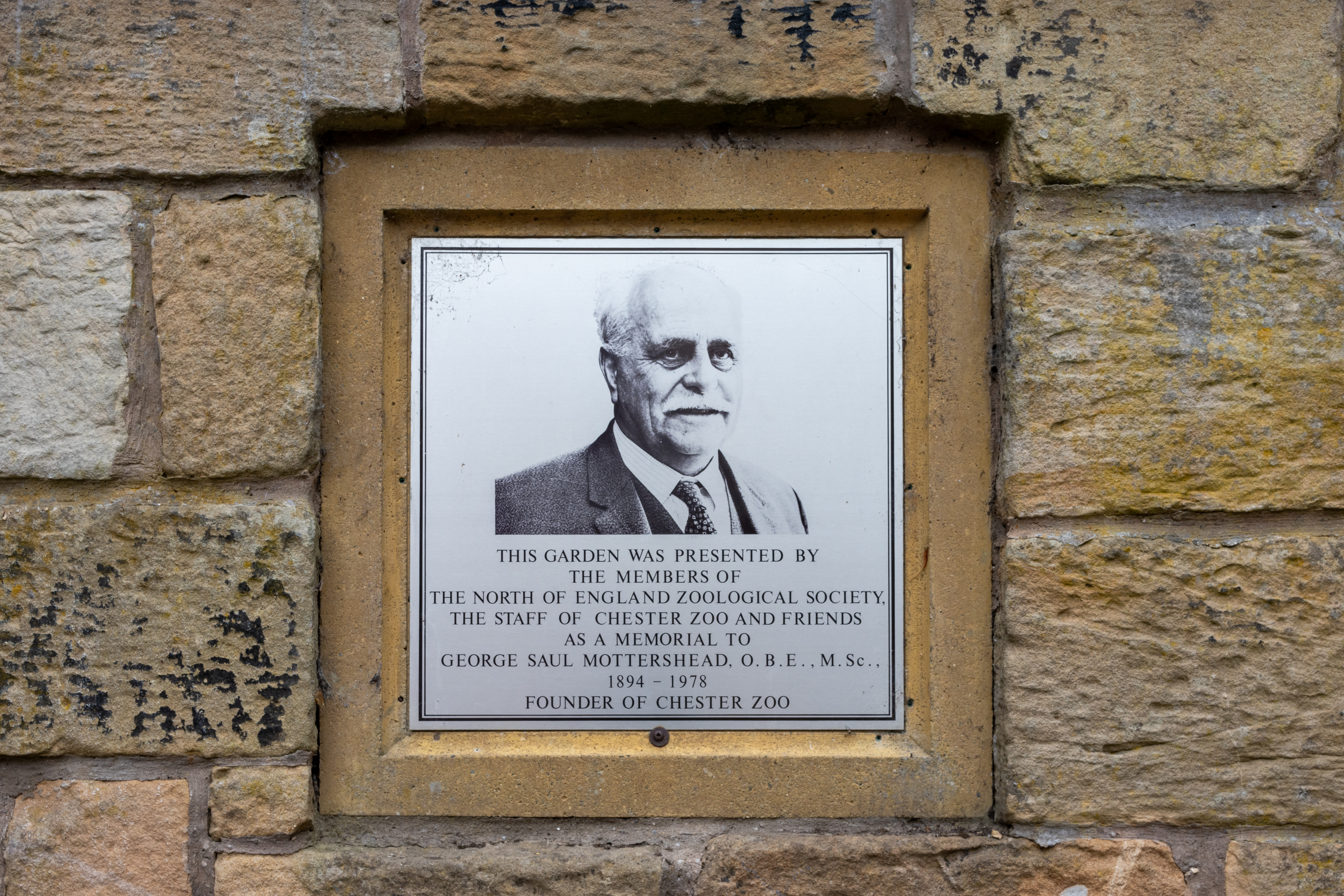
Plaque in a garden at the zoo as a memorial to the founder, George Saul Mottershead.

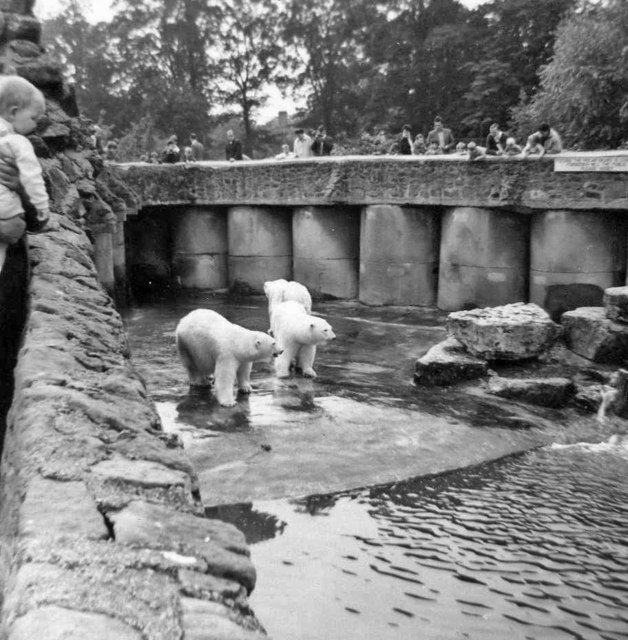
Polar bear exhibit, 1967.

The Mottershead family's market garden business was based in Shavington near Crewe. George Mottershead collected animals such as lizards and insects that arrived with exotic plants imported by the business. A visit to Belle Vue Zoo in Manchester as a boy in 1903 fuelled his developing interest in creating a zoo of his own.

Mottershead was wounded in the First World War and spent several years in a wheelchair. Despite this, his collection of animals grew and he began to search for a suitable home for his zoo. He chose Oakfield Manor in Upton-by-Chester, which was a country village then but now is a suburb of Chester. He bought Oakfield Manor for £3,500 in 1930. The house had 9 acres (3.6 ha) of gardens and provided easy access to the railways and to Manchester and Liverpool. There were local objections, but Mottershead prevailed, and Chester Zoo opened to the public on 10 June 1931. The first animals were displayed in pens in the courtyard.

An Ordnance Survey inch-a-mile map published in 1936 shows the area around as farmland and villages and marks the present Zoo area north of Oakfield as "Butter Hill".

Rapid expansion followed after the Second World War, despite the difficulty of sourcing materials. Mottershead had to be resourceful; the polar bear exhibit (1950) was built from recycled wartime road blocks and pillboxes. "Always building" was the zoo's slogan at the time. Mottershead received the OBE, an honorary degree of MSc, and served as President of the International Union of Zoo Directors. He died in 1978 aged 84.

=== Zoo design ===
Mottershead wanted to build a zoo without the traditional Victorian iron bars to cage the animals. He was influenced by the ideas of Carl Hagenbeck, who invented the modern zoo concept and by Heini Hediger, a pioneer of ethology.

At Chester, Mottershead took Hagenbeck's idea for moats and ditches as an alternative to cage bars, and extended their use throughout the zoo, often with species that Hagenbeck had not considered. For example, when chimpanzees were released into their new enclosure at Chester in 1956, a group of grassy islands, they were separated from visitors by no more than a 12-foot (3.7 m) strip of water. Nobody knew then if chimps could swim. It turned out that they could not, and today the chimp islands are a centrepiece of Chester Zoo.

In 1986 the zoo was enclosed with a fence, in line with the Zoo Licensing Act 1981.

=== 21st century ===
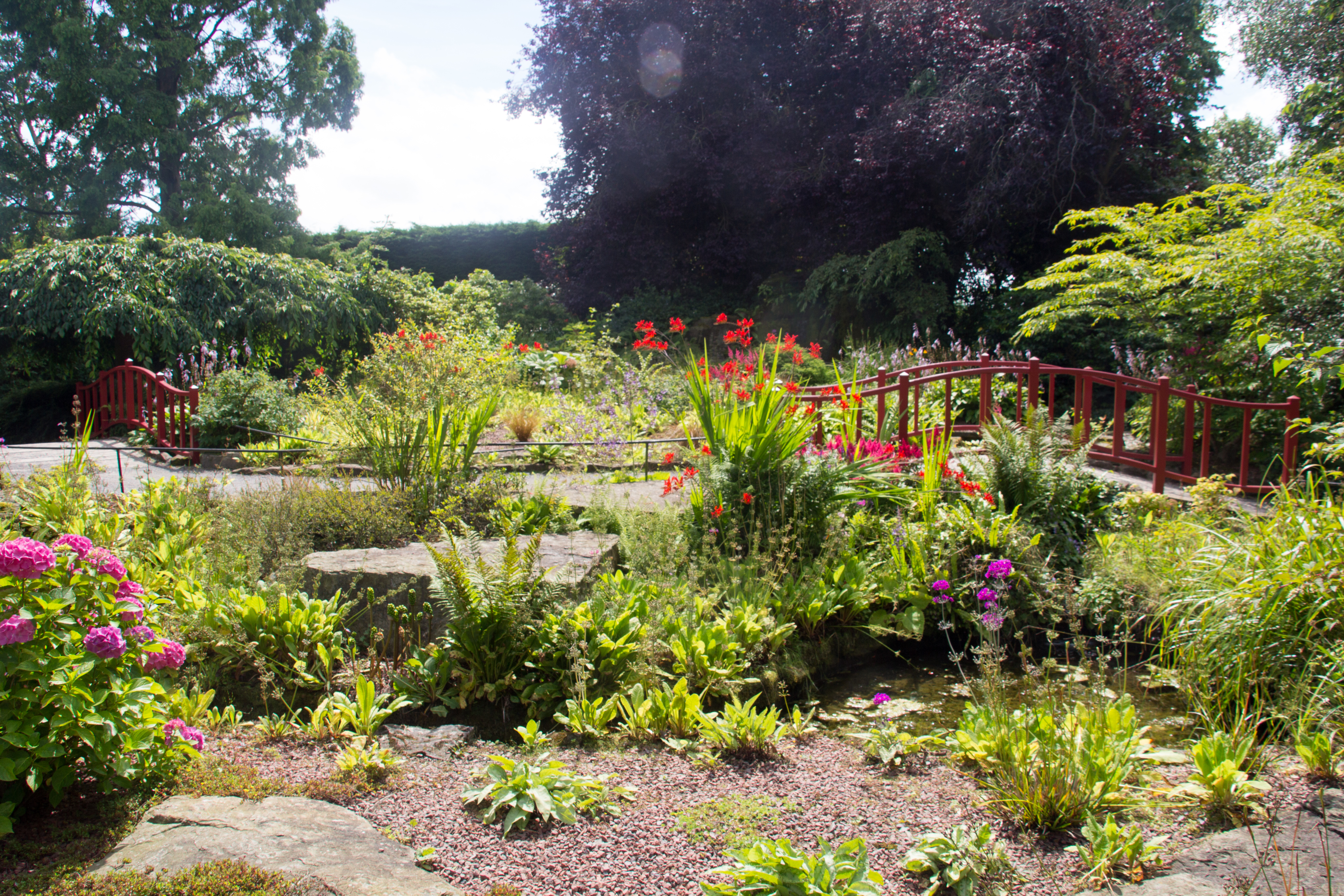
A garden area in the zoo.

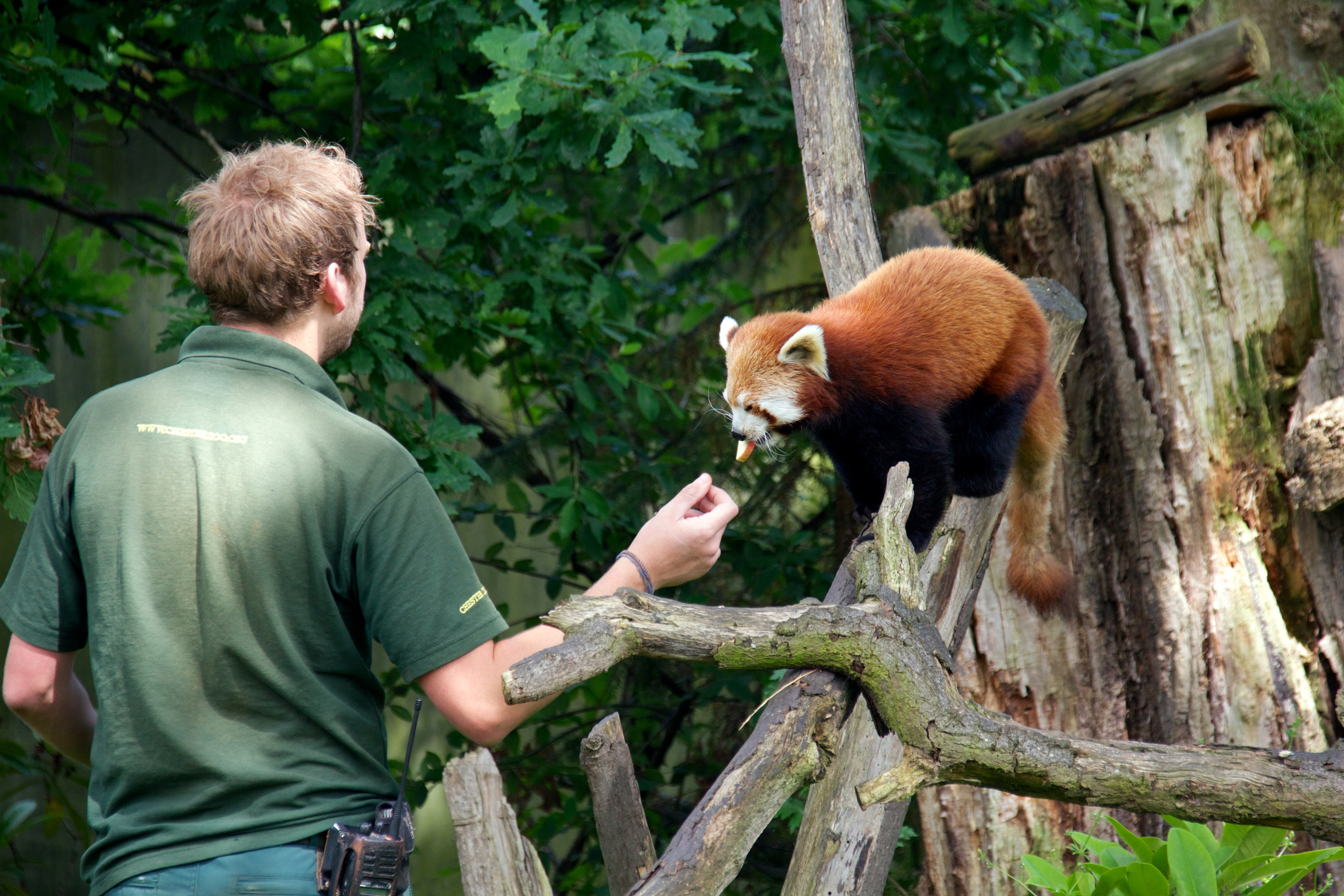
Red panda (Ailurus fulgens) with a zookeeper.

Realm of the Red Ape, an Indonesian-forest-themed exhibit, featuring threatened Sumatran and Bornean orangutans, opened in May 2007.

In January 2009, Chester Zoo unveiled Natural Vision, a £225 million plan to transform itself into the largest conservation attraction in Europe. The first phase of the plan was to be a £90 million, 56-hectare (140-acre) enclosed African-rainforest-themed sanctuary containing a band of gorillas and a troop of chimpanzees, as well as okapi and a variety of tropical birds, amphibians, reptiles, fishes, and invertebrates, moving freely among lush vegetation. It included a water ride to take visitors through the exhibit. Natural Vision was to eventually include a 90-room hotel, a Conservation College, and a revamped main entrance that would link the zoo to a marina to be developed on zoo land, all to be completed by 2018. Plans went before the public for comment in June 2009.

The projected Heart of Africa bio-dome, along with plans for the hotel, were shelved in 2011 due to the loss of £40m potential funding when the North West Regional Development Agency was abolished.

In December 2012, planning permission was gained for a later phase of the Natural Vision masterplan. One of the largest zoo developments in Europe, Islands at Chester Zoo is a £40 million redevelopment project to extend the zoo's footprint and recreate six island habitats of Southeast Asia. As of 2017 it is now open.

A 600,000 square foot nature reserve was opened in April 2018. The reserve sits outside the boundary of the main zoo and is free for people to enter.

In October 2018, two Indian elephant calves (Nandita, aged three years, and Aayu, aged 18 months), died of elephant endotheliotropic herpesvirus (EEHV). From 1995 on, this virus disease has caused many deaths of Indian elephants across the world in zoos and in the wild.

On 15 December 2018, an electrical fault caused a fire to break out at the Monsoon Forest Habitat. The zoo had to be evacuated and was closed. Fifteen fire crews attended the zoo along with two rapid response units and an ambulance. All mammals were accounted for and one person was treated for the effects of smoke inhalation. Some birds, frogs, fish and small insects were killed in the blaze. The zoo reopened on Sunday 16 December 2018.

Chester Zoo monorail was an internal transport system for visitors from 1991 to 2019, but was closed, as it had become unreliable and covered less than half the zoo due to the zoo's expansion to over 125 acres (51 ha). Land from the monorail was to be used for a new attraction called Heart of Africa, an open African savannah habitat and vulture aviary.

In March 2024, Chester Zoo announced the arrival of two snow leopards as part of a global conservation breeding programme. The zoo also announced the opening of a new Himalayan habitat for two big cats. The habitat is also home to red pandas, and a number of birds, including Himalayan monals.

In July 2025, the zoo announced the birth of its first snow leopard cub, a female named Bheri.

The Heart of Africa exhibit opened in April 2025. The 22.5 acre (nine hectare) savannah exhibit is designed to replicate the grasslands of Africa. The exhibit houses 57 species, including giraffes, zebras, naked mole-rats and 15,000 locusts.

The zoo are also, at the same time, developing The Reserve Hotel project, a collection of 51 lodges, restaurant and access into the zoo.

== Management structure ==
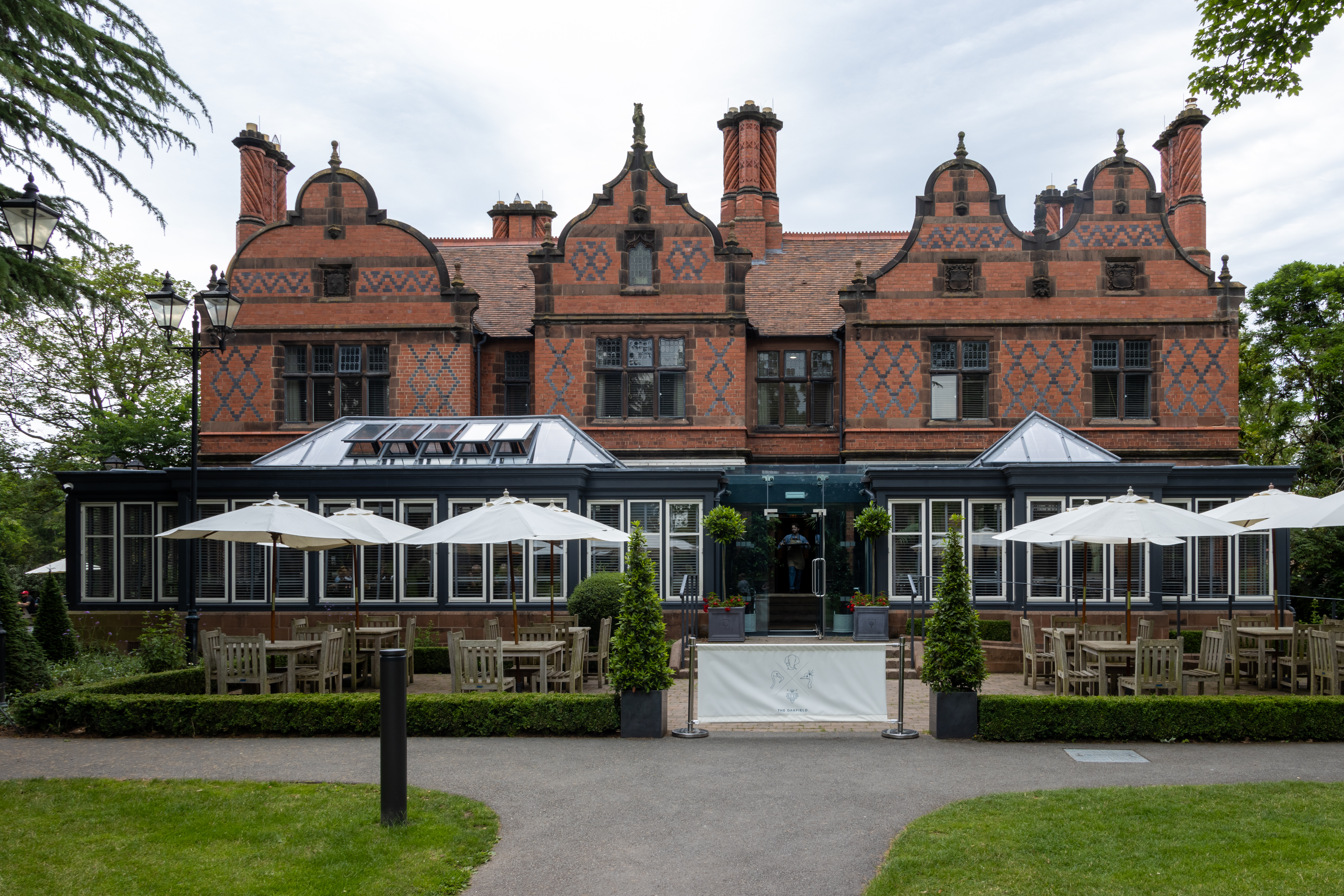
The Oakfield, gastropub serving visitors and the community of Chester outside normal operating hours.

The North of England Zoological Society (NEZS) is the organisation that runs Chester Zoo. It was formed in 1931 by the zoo's founder, George Mottershead.

The zoo is managed by a team led by CEO Jamie Christon DL and he reports to the Board of Trustees. Christon is tasked with focusing on the unified strategy which supports the Strategic Development Plan and Conservation Plan. The plan includes the development of Heart of Africa, The Reserve Hotel, new education facilities, The Square wedding venue, and from 2028 the development of African Forests. The executive focuses on education change and DEAI through its people and culture. Chester Zoo leads in public affairs and has influenced heavily at the heart of UK government.

The zoo employs over 650 permanent staff, increasing to over 1,000 during the main summer period.

== Layout and facilities ==
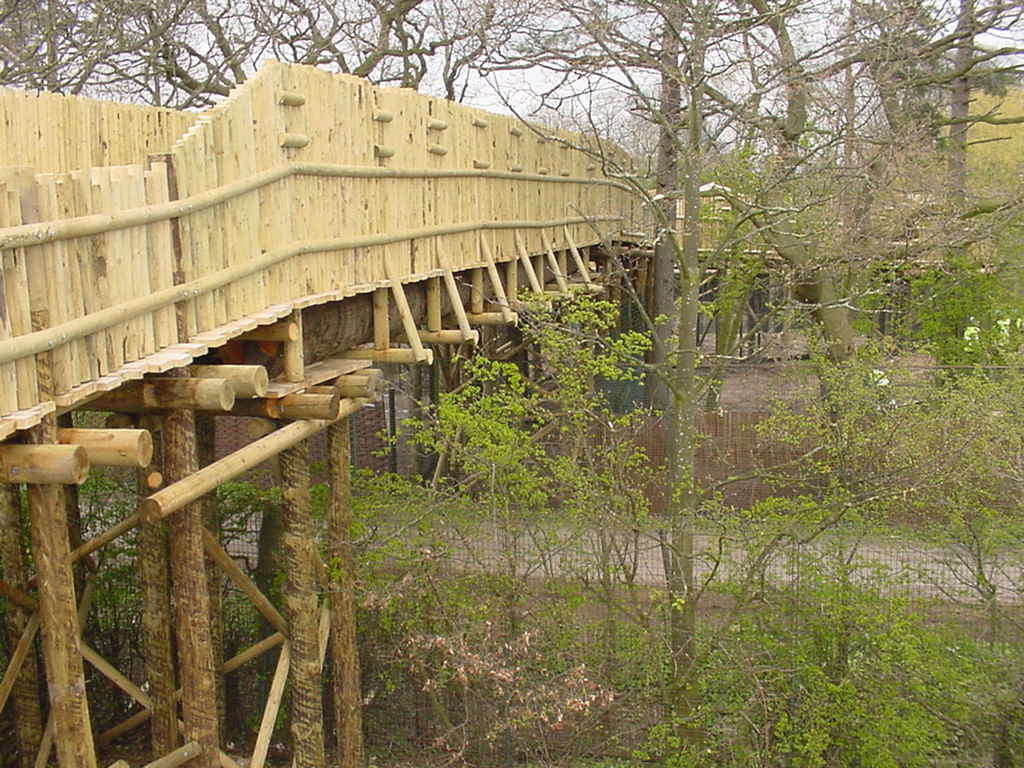
Bridge over Flag Lane

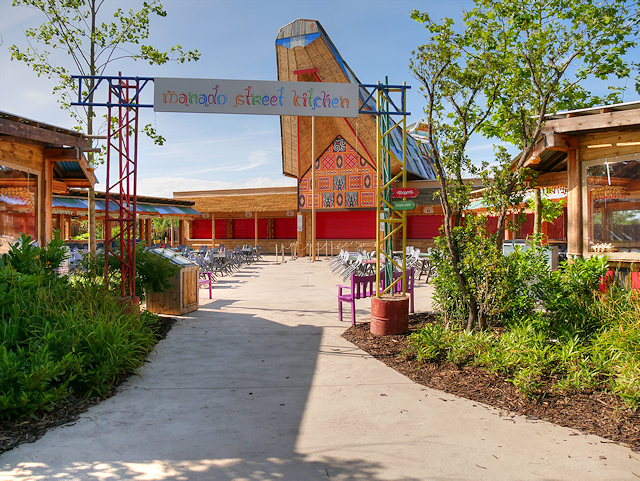
Manado Street Kitchen

The zoo is bisected by a public bridleway, Flag Lane (formerly the Millennium Cycle Path). For many years, a single bridge (now called Elephants' Bridge), drivable by zoo vehicles and powered wheelchairs, near the elephant exhibit was the only crossing place within the grounds. A second crossing, passable by pedestrians and mobility scooters, called Bats' Bridge, opened in April 2008 near the Twilight Zone (now called Fruit Bat Forest), has improved the ability of visitors to circulate. The opening of the new bridge also meant that visitors are now able to view on foot animals that were previously visible only from the monorail, as well as panoramic views of the zoo itself.

For a long time, the public entrance was at the east end off Caughall Road. In the summer of 1995, the public entrance moved to the north side with dedicated access off the A41 Chester By-Pass. A brown sign which gave visitors directions to the new entrance was installed at the junction of the former entrance, and curiously, it remained there until the 2010s. Thus, the zoo is entered in the 'newer' part west of Flag Lane, near the elephants, and the old car parks at the east end are being built over with service, admin and educational buildings. The new entrance was re-modelled in 2012 to commemorate the Queen's Diamond Jubilee. The zoo owns land outside the public area, and uses that land to grow food for its herbivorous animals.

Chester's catering facilities include Bembé Kitchen (formerly the Tsavo Café) near the main entrance which opened in 2006 to replace the former Oasis Café (formerly Mpila Snack Bar until the early 1980s). June's Pavilion (formerly the Jubilee Café and latterly the Ark Restaurant) is on the west of the zoo and Manado Street Kitchen is found on Sulawesi in the Islands exhibit. The Oakfield is a restaurant in a Victorian mansion house near the lion enclosure, and along with the Acorn Bar, are both used for private functions as well as catering to zoo visitors. There are three locations for food and drink in the Heart of Africa exhibit, including Pamoja Village.

There are children's play areas, shops, kiosks and several picnic lawns around the zoo. A second pedestrian entrance is located in the southeast corner of the zoo behind Oakfield House.

In 2025, the zoo was divided into colour zones to ease navigating the expansive site. The Yellow Zone includes the zoo's elephants, monkeys, bats and spectacled bears. The Pink Zone includes the Islands exhibit, housing animals such as southern cassowaries, Sumatran tigers and binturongs. The Orange Zone includes the Heart of Africa exhibit, housing eastern black rhinoceros, meerkats and flamingos. The Green Zone includes The Spirit of the Jaguar exhibit, as well as chimpanzees, aye-ayes, okapis and sloths. The Blue Zone includes the Dragons in Danger habitat, Himalayas and Madagascar, featuring animals such as lemurs, snow leopards and Komodo dragons.

== Species and animals ==
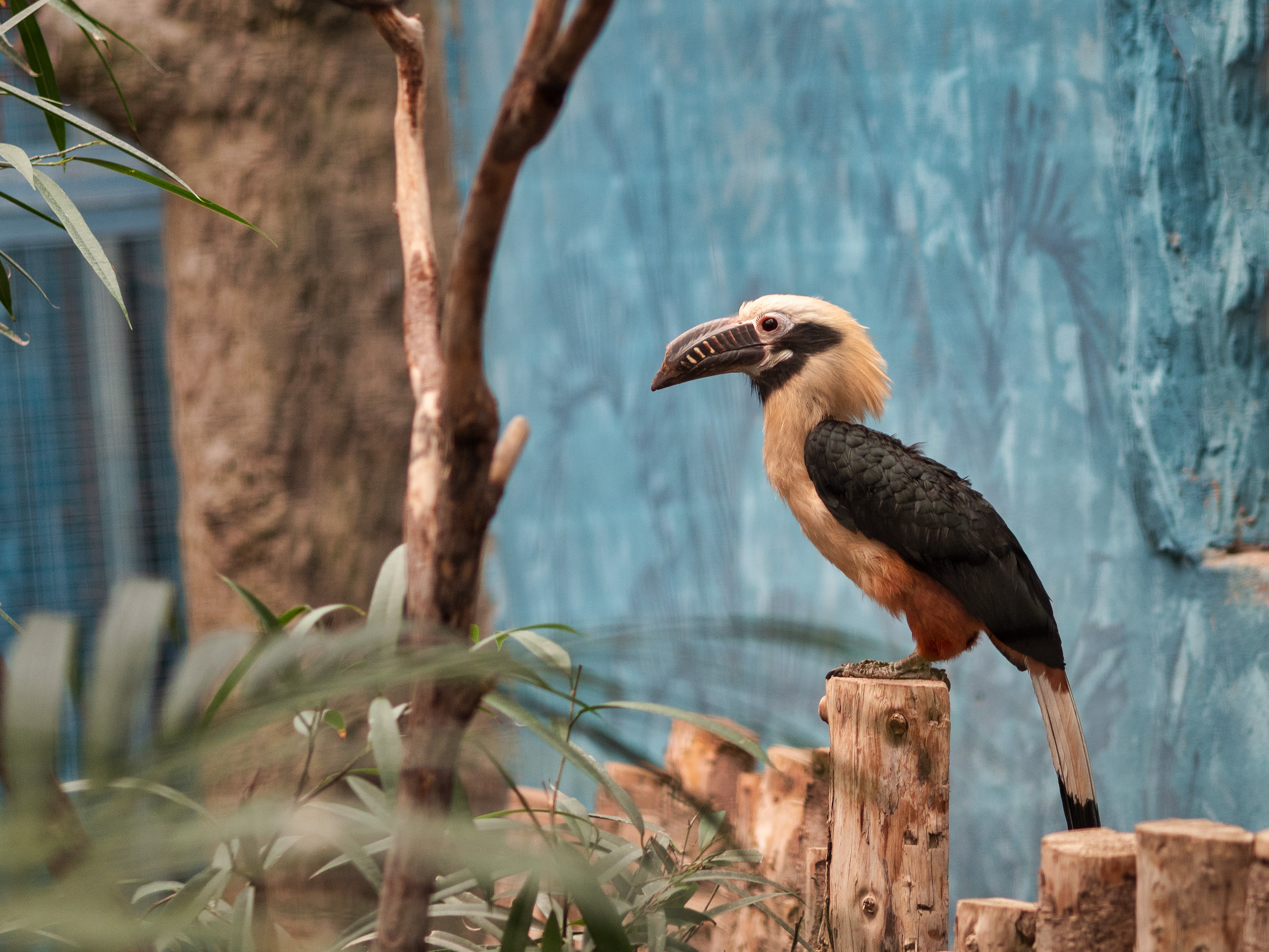
Visayan hornbill (Penelopides panini).

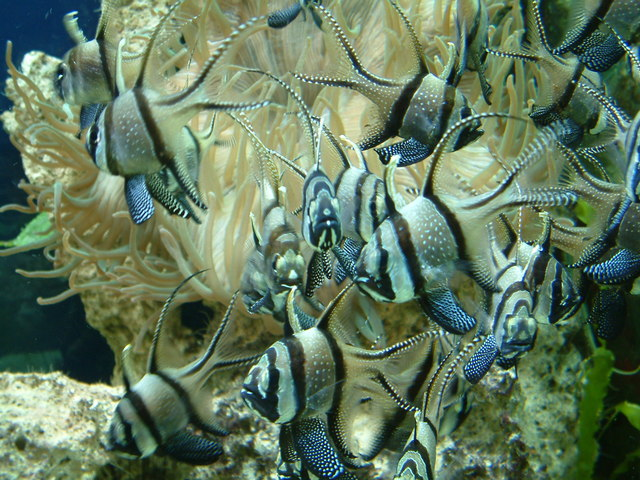
Aquariums at the zoo.

Chester Zoo holds one of the largest and most diverse zoological collections in the UK with around 30,000 animals from over 500 species. The collection includes representatives from all the vertebrate classes as well as many invertebrate groups. Rare species on exhibit include Persian onager, Coquerel's sifaka, great hornbill, Boelen's python and tuatara. For all these species, among others, Chester Zoo is the only UK holder.

The Zoo's botanical collection includes more than 400 threatened plant species and five National Plant Collections (Copiapoa, Matucana, Nepenthes, Pleurothallidinae spp. and Turbinicarpus.)

The table below shows the number of species and animals held by Chester Zoo according their 2025 animal inventory:

Group	Number of species	Number of animals
Mammals	98	1585
Birds	144	1621
Reptiles	58	521
Amphibians	26	1129
Fish	78	10044
Invertebrates	103	14699
Total	507	29599

== Conservation ==
At the end of 2007, over half the species at the zoo appeared on the IUCN Red List and 155 were classified as threatened species. 134 species were kept as part of a managed captive breeding programme. The zoo manages the studbooks for Congo buffalo, jaguar, blue-eyed cockatoo, Madagascan tree boa, gemsbok (all ESB species), eastern black rhinoceros, Ecuadorian amazon parrot, Mindanao writhe-billed hornbill, Sumatran tiger and Rodrigues flying fox (all EEP species). At the end of 2015, Chester Zoo became the first zoo outside of New Zealand to breed the tuatara.

The zoo sees its role as helping to conserves both animals and plants and has appropriate plant life in its animal locations as an aspect of this work.

== Animal exhibits ==
=== Heart of Africa ===
Orange Zone

Heart of Africa opened in 2025 and is the largest zoo habitat ever created in the UK. The expansive 22.5 acre exhibit is home to 57 species, including 15,000 locusts, a flock of 107 greater flamingos, critically endangered vultures, and a colony of naked mole rats. Built around a large open savannah with multiple species living side by side, the exhibit is also the new home to the zoo's Rothschild's giraffes, African wild dogs and sees the return of Grevy's zebra to the zoo.

The indoor habitat, Hidden Savannah, houses 11 cold-blooded species including the African bullfrog and red spitting cobra, as well as critically endangered pancake tortoises. Hidden Savannah is also home to small mammals such as Karoo short-eared sengi and pygmy mice.

The Zoo's Eastern black rhinoceros exhibit, originally opened in 2003 as the Tsavo Rhino Experience, has been incorporated into Heart of Africa. The exhibit is modelled on the Tsavo National Park in Kenya. The Zoo has a successful rhinoceros breeding programme with ten calves born between 2008 and 2018. The Zoo's latest rhino birth was a female calf, Lumi, in November 2023.

Opposite the black rhinoceros lies the Tsavo Aviary, a walk-through exhibit featuring a variety of African birds. It was originally opened in 2009 as the Tsavo Bird Safari, and is now incorporated into Heart of Africa. It currently houses von der decken's hornbills, lilac-breasted rollers, hammerkops, weaver birds and a variety of waterfowl, amongst other species.

=== Islands ===
Pink Zone

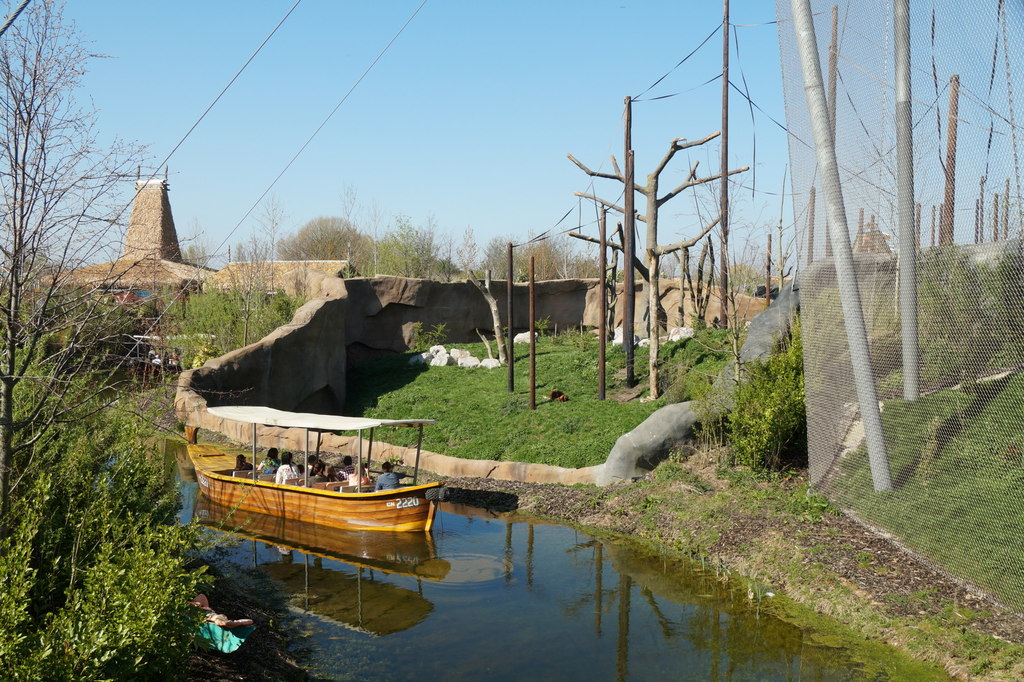
Lazy River boat ride in Islands

The Zoo opened Islands in July 2015, a project which extended its footprint by 15 acres southwards to the A41 boundary.

Islands features species from the Philippines and Indonesia, areas where the Zoo is involved in in situ conservation programmes. Visitors are able to walk through six themed "islands" (representing Panay, Papua, Bali, Sumatra, Sumba and Sulawesi) via a series of pathways, bridges and buildings. The project also includes a boat ride, educational exhibits, play areas and a restaurant, the Manado Street Kitchen.

The exhibit opened in three phases between 2015 and 2017. The first phase featured the Lazy River boat ride around open-air enclosures for Visayan warty pigs, southern cassowaries, Javan banteng, lowland anoa and North Sulawesi babirusas; plus a walk-through bird aviary featuring critically endangered Bali starlings, as well as Java sparrows, pied imperial pigeons and purple-naped lories.

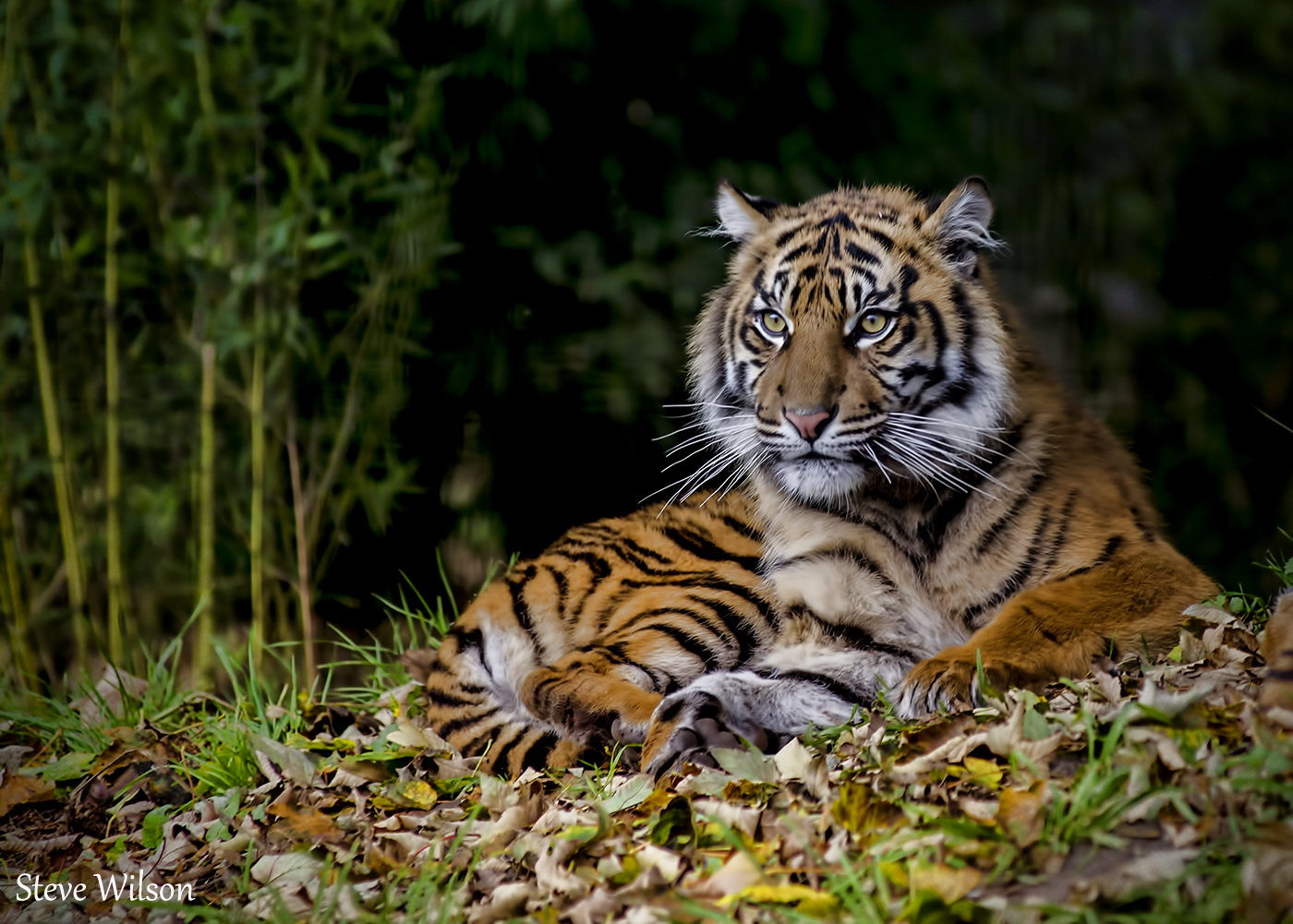
Young female Sumatran tiger

The second phase included Monsoon Forest, the UK's largest indoor zoo habitat, and the Sumatran tiger exhibit. In Monsoon Forest, visitors can view Sumatran orangutans, silvery gibbons, Sulawesi crested macaques, Sunda wrinkled hornbills, Sunda gharials and many other reptiles, amphibians, fish, invertebrates and free-flying birds. The Zoo's critically endangered Sumatran tigers are a breeding pair. Dash (male) and Kasarna (female) produced their first cubs in 2023.

The third phase included exhibits for Malayan sun bears, Palawan binturongs and Malayan tapirs, as well as a walk-through aviary featuring various Indonesian songbirds.

=== Elephants of the Asian Forest ===
Yellow Zone

Chester Zoo currently holds five Asian elephants in a purpose-built breeding and research facility. The group includes an elderly female (Maya, born in 1966), a mother and daughter pair (Karishma, born in 1998, and Elizabeth, born in 2016) and a young half-sibling pair (female Indali, born in 2016, and male Anjan, born in 2018). Maya arrived from Chessington World of Adventures in 1990 and Karishma and Elizabeth came from Whipsnade Zoo in 2025. Indali and Anjan were both born at Chester Zoo.

Elephants of the Asian Forest was completed in two phases. The outdoor exhibit was opened in 2000 and comprises a main paddock of 5,900m^{2}, a bull yard of 550m^{2} and two holding pens of 270m^{2} each. A new building replacing the previous elephant house was completed in 2006 at a cost of £3 million. It is modelled on an Assamese rainforest and has a total footprint of 2,730m^{2}. In addition to the elephant holding pens, the building contains exhibits for other indigenous Asian species, including great hornbills, azure-winged magpies, red-billed blue magpies, prevost's squirrels, belanger's tree shrews and northern Luzon giant cloud rats. There is also a 23,800 litre aquarium housing clown loach and tiger barbs.

Chester Zoo's history with Asian elephants dates back to 1941, when individuals evacuated from other British zoos during wartime were moved to Chester for their safety. A new elephant house opened in 1961 and was used to house both Asian and African elephants, as well as rhinoceroses, hippopotamuses and tapirs. In 1977, Chester became the first zoo in the UK to successfully breed the Asian species with the arrival of a calf named Jubilee. Motty, a hybrid African-Asian elephant calf was born in July 1978, but died in infancy. He has been named by Guinness World Records as "the rarest elephant on record".

Chester's Asian elephant herd has produced many more calves over the past 30 years, but several have succumbed to the deadly EEHV virus. In 2025, the zoo announced the development of a new vaccine which triggers the required immune response to protect elephants from EEHV. The vaccine was developed in partnership with the University of Surrey and the Animal and Plant Health Agency and was trialled on adult elephants at Chester. The next step is to conduct trials on younger elephants, which are at highest risk from the virus.

The zoo is bringing forward plans to increase the size of their elephant exhibit to meet the new minimum space requirements set out in the UK Government's 2025 animal welfare reforms.

=== Asian Plains and paddocks ===
Yellow Zone

In 2008, Asian Plains received its official opening. Based around a mixed-species paddock featuring Burmese brown-antlered deer, the exhibit has recently been extended to include new enclosures for greater one-horned rhinoceroses and cheetahs. The male rhino was joined by a female in 2008 to form a pair which the zoo hoped would breed. Sadly, in November 2009, the zoo's male Indian rhino, Patna, was put down due to a longstanding leg injury. The zoo obtained a replacement male from Edinburgh Zoo in March 2010. Since they were closely related, the previous female departed for a zoo in Spain shortly after, and the zoo are in the progress of creating a breeding situation – Baabu has now been exchanged for Beni from Plzeň Zoo. The paddocks formerly housed barasingha, Ankole cattle blackbuck and sitatunga.

A sandy paddock for Persian onagers lies in the centre of the Zoo. They formerly shared the space with Bactrian camels, but the camels have since moved to the old giraffe exhibit. Zebra have also been displayed here in the past. A paddock which was only visible from the monorail but can now be seen from the Bats Bridge holds a group of Philippine spotted deer.

=== Cheetah habitat ===
Yellow Zone

Cheetah returned to the Zoo in November 2025 with the arrival of a pair of one-year old brothers Kendi and Tafari from Yorkshire Wildlife Park. The subspecies held by Chester is the critically-endangered Northeast African cheetah, with fewer than 500 estimated to remain in the wild. The Zoo previously held cheetah between 2008 and 2024, with successful breeding taking place in 2011 and 2013. The 6,000m^{2} cheetah habitat can be viewed from the elevated boardwalk leading to Bat's Bridge and from a sheltered viewing area styled on an African round hut.

=== Monkey Islands and Miniature Monkeys ===
Yellow Zone

Monkey Islands was opened in 1997, replacing the old monkey house, and is currently home to four monkey species: Colombian spider monkeys, mandrills, lion-tailed macaques and roloway monkeys. Former inhabitants include golden-bellied capuchins, Campbell's mona monkeys, Sulawesi crested macaques and crested porcupines. Visitors enter the monkey house and view the animals from a central corridor. Each species has a glass-fronted indoor enclosure with climbing apparatus and an outdoor enclosure, moated and heavily planted.

Miniature Monkeys, opened in May 2004, consists of two enclosures. The first is home to a pair of pied tamarins with pygmy marmosets, and the second is shared by three emperor tamarins and three golden-headed lion tamarins. Geoffrey's marmosets, black-tailed marmosets, black lion tamarins, red titi monkeys and white-faced sakis have also been housed here in the past but have been moved out for various reasons.

=== Bears of the Cloud Forest ===
Yellow Zone

Bears of the Cloud Forest opened in 2004 and is home to a pair of spectacled bears and other South American animals. The purpose-built exhibit is designed to mimic the bear's natural habitat by providing trees and a rocky terrain. Nearby are paddocks housing capybaras, giant anteaters, and Brazilian tapirs. Guanacos and vicuñas were previously housed in this section, along with rheas.

=== Fruit Bat Forest ===
Yellow Zone

Fruit Bat Forest is the largest free-flying bat cave in Europe. The cave holds two species of bat: Rodrigues fruit bats, and Seba's short-tailed bats. It is also home to a varied collection of other species including, blind cave fish and barbary striped grass mice, and a list that formerly included species such as tailless tenrecs.

=== Asiatic lions ===
Green Zone

The Zoo's lions are the endangered Asiatic subspecies, held as part of the European conservation breeding programme. They are exhibited in a 4,790 square metre enclosure which was completed in 2019 and is modelled on the Gir Forest in India, the only place Asiatic lions are found in the wild. The zoo's current pair arrived in December 2025. The male, Nilay, was born in Cologne Zoo in January 2024 and the female, Shanti, was born in London Zoo in March 2024. Prior to their arrival, Chester had held a trio of lions (male Iblis and females Kiburi and Kumari) but they never produced cubs. The last time the zoo bred lions was in 2007, when a single male cub, Tejas, was hand-reared by keepers. On the way to and from the lion habitat, visitors pass exhibits for domestic goats and the UK's only great hornbills. The hornbill aviary previously held peafowl and Brahminy starlings.

=== Tropical Realm ===
Green Zone

Tropical Realm is Britain's largest tropical house at over 26,000 cubic metres. Opened in 1964, most of the interior is an open-plan space extending to roof level and themed with pools and mature tropical plants, with pathways for visitors through the undergrowth. Here, more than 30 species of birds are free-flying, including Nicobar pigeons, various species of starlings and ground birds such as crested partridges.

Aviaries and vivaria are arranged around the sides of the building; those on the upper level were originally designed for birds of paradise and the hornbill aviaries were originally made for gorillas. The aviaries currently house birds such as great Indian hornbills, rhinoceros hornbills, two pairs of tarictic hornbill (one pure-bred and one hybrid), writhed-billed hornbills, red-crested turacos, Palawan peacock-pheasants, Congo peafowl, Bali starlings, blue-crowned pigeons, fairy-bluebirds, white-rumped shama, white-crested turacos, snowy-crowned robin chats, Mindanao bleeding-hearts, Green aracari and Philippine scops owls. At the entrance is an aviary for Sumatran laughingthrushes and grey-winged blackbirds.

The Tropical Realm is also the centre of the reptile collection. The crocodile pools (which formerly housed dwarf crocodiles, American alligators and Philippine crocodiles) currently house spectacled caimans in one and white-winged wood ducks in the other. Near the entrance is an enclosure for tuataras. This lizard-like species from New Zealand is the last surviving sphenodont, a prehistoric group of reptiles, and Chester is the only British zoo to exhibit them. In February 2016, a tuatara hatched for the first time outside of New Zealand, leading Chester Zoo to be the only zoo to have bred them anywhere else. There were many varieties of snakes and lizards in the past (many had to depart as a result); rhinoceros ratsnakes, emerald tree boas and eyelash vipers now being the only remaining. The lizard collection is now made up of serrated casquehead iguanas, green-crested Lizards, northern caiman lizards, and a Parson's chameleon.

Tortoises are represented by Galápagos and radiated tortoises with Vietnamese box turtles. Amphibians include poison dart frogs, Golden mantellas, a Rio Cauca caecilian, false tomato frogs and Morelet's tree frogs.

From late 2015 to early 2016, the former golden-bellied capuchin exhibit at the rear of Tropical Realm was converted into a nocturnal zone housing a pair of aye-ayes and a group of Malagasy giant rats. The capuchin's moated outdoor exihibit is now home to a group of cottontop tamarins.

=== Forest Zone and Butterfly Journey ===
Green Zone

The northeast area of the zoo is where many forest-dwelling species are kept. As well as the chimpanzees, okapis, jaguars, condors and Tropical Realm, there are enclosures for Congo buffaloes, and red river hogs. Nearby is a large paddock and house for domestic Bactrian camels, which used to hold the Zoo's giraffes before their move to Heart of Africa in 2025. The area between the rear of Tropical Realm and the Spirit of the Jaguar has enclosures for various species including a group of native sand lizards, and a mixed enclosure for red-billed curassows and Inca Jays.

In 2008 the Zoo opened Butterfly Journey, a heated butterfly and invertebrate house which features free-flying butterflies and moths and free-roaming millipedes and frogs. Exotic species on show include blue morphos, giant owls, glasswings, swallowtails and Atlas moths), as well as a cabinet of cocoons and a caterpillar hatchery. A row of vivariums near the exit door hold a variety of invertebrates, including stick insects, hissing cockroaches and katydids.

Animals formerly displayed in Forest Zone include maned wolves, babirusa, warthogs, Mallorcan midwife toads, golden-bellied capuchins, visayan warty pigs and ring-tailed coatis.

=== Secret World of the Okapi ===
Green Zone

Formerly the camel house, this enclosure adjoining the giraffe house was remodelled in 2006 to house okapis. Initially two males were kept: Dicky arrived from Marwell Wildlife in 2005 and Mbuti came from Bristol Zoo in the same year. In 2006, Dicky left for London Zoo to make way for a female named Stuma from Germany. In 2009, Mbuti and Dicky were swapped back, with Mbuti going to London Zoo and Dicky coming back to Chester. Other animals that can be seen here include Red forest duikers, Gambian pouched rats, butterfly barbs, Gaboon vipers and short-eared elephant shrews. Mount Kulal spiny mice and Mesic four-striped grass mice have also been kept here in the past along with various other small species. The Okapi bred for the first time in 2012, producing a female calf named Tafari. The success was repeated in 2014 with the birth of a new male calf.

=== The Chimpanzee Breeding Centre ===
Green Zone

This pavilion was opened in 1989 by Diana, Princess of Wales and Countess of Chester, and is home to 26 Western chimpanzees. This is the largest colony of chimps in Europe, housed in the Roundhouse, a conical indoor enclosure linked to an outside moated island. The island is planted with many bushes and has large poles for the chimps to climb on. The inside area has a climbing frame that allows the chimps to stay close together on several levels of platform. There are seven interconnected off-show dens.

=== Spirit of the Jaguar ===
Green Zone

Spirit of the Jaguar opened in 2001 and was designed by McCormick Architecture. It features exhibits for jaguars and other species from the Amazon rainforest. The exhibit was updated in 2011 to focus on human/wildlife conflict.

The jaguar exhibit can hold up to four cats and is split into two sections, each with an indoor and outdoor space. The indoor areas are modelled on a rainforest and a dry savannah and the outdoor areas contain climbing features and pools for behavioural enrichment. It is currently home to three jaguars: female Bonita and her son Remi occupy the first section and melanistic female Inka occupies the second.

Spirit of the Jaguar is also home to Linnaeus's two-toed sloths, Azara's agouti and a variety of amphibians, fish and invertebrates. A centrepiece open-topped aquarium features numerous Amazonian fish including red-bellied piranhas and shoals of tetra.

=== Realm of the Red Ape ===
Green Zone

Realm of the Red Ape is a £3.5 million extension to the existing orangutan house, home to Bornean orangutans, and was the most expensive capital project in the zoo's history before the construction of Islands. The exhibit opened to the public on 26 May 2007 after a two-year construction period. It comprises a new two-story building linked to the existing orangutan house with three indoor and two outdoor enclosures, providing accommodation for a larger number of apes. The outdoor areas can be viewed from a first floor public gallery and feature mesh roofs supported by tree-like structures which act as climbing frames for the apes. A further enclosure houses a group of lar gibbons.

Animals and plants from Indonesia are exhibited inside Realm of the Red Ape in a rainforest-themed setting. Birds on display include blue-crowned hanging parrots, Timor sparrows, chestnut-backed thrushes, roul-roul partridges, superb fruit doves and black-naped fruit doves. Crocodile monitors, reticulated pythons, red-tailed racers, Bell's Angle-Head Lizards, Chinese water dragons, emerald tree monitors, white-lipped tree vipers and green tree pythons feature among the reptiles. Invertebrates include Rhinoceros beetles, giant walking sticks, common crow butterflies, jungle nymphs, praying mantises, Malaysian Katydids and leaf insects.

The zoo's Sumatran orangutans were relocated from Realm of the Red Ape to a new exhibit in the Islands development during January 2016.

=== Latin American Wetland Aviary ===
Blue Zone

The former Caribbean flamingo exhibit has been redeveloped as a mixed-species netted aviary for Latin American wetland birds. The new exhibit opened in June 2021, coinciding with the Zoo's 90th anniversary. Visitors enter the aviary along a walkway and viewing platform which project out over a lake, giving uninterrupted views of the birds. In addition to the 100-strong flock of flamingos, the aviary is home to scarlet ibises, roseate spoonbills, black-necked stilts, Orinoco geese, Muscovy ducks, ringed teals, black-bellied whistling ducks, saffron finches and other waterfowl species.

=== Giant otters and penguins ===
Blue Zone

In early 2010, the zoo's California sea lions left the collection. During this time, the pool was converted to house a new species to the zoo. The giant otters went on show for the first time on 26 March 2010. The zoo bred their first pups in 2013. On April 13 2026 Triplets were born.

In the neighbouring enclosure, a large breeding group of over 50 Humboldt penguins have their own pool, and visitors can watch the birds from an underwater viewing window.

=== Dragons in Danger ===
Blue Zone

This exhibit is primarily a herpetarium for the zoo's Komodo dragons, Jantan and Ora who arrived from Prague Zoo in 2014, originating from the Lesser Sunda Islands. It was opened in 1998 and extended in 2003 to include an outdoor enclosure used by the dragons in the warmer summer months. The exhibit is built on the site of the zoo's former bird house. In 2007, several young baby Komodo dragons were put on display after one of the zoo's two females laid eggs which hatched although the female had not been mated; this is parthenogenesis, the first such case recorded in this species. The exhibit was revamped in 2009 to house Caribbean iguanas in one section of the building. It now currently houses spiny turtles in one side and critically endangered mountain chicken frogs along with Caribbean hermit crabs in the other.

Dragons in Danger also houses various Indonesian and Philippine rainforest birds, such as Palawan peacock-pheasants, pheasant pigeons, Montserrat orioles and Visayan tarictic hornbills. Recently added was a pair of Philippine mouse deer which have successfully bred. Also housed here are Montserrat tarantulas, which Chester bred in 2016 for the first time in captivity. Species formerly kept in the exhibit include Socorro doves, Mindanao bleeding-hearts, Papuan lorikeets and Saint Lucia parrots.

=== Madagascar ===
Blue Zone

Opened in 2019 as Madagascar Forest, this development exhibits endangered species from Madagascar. Themed displays also provide visitors with information on field conservation projects supported by the Zoo. The 5,875m^{2} site is located in the centre of the zoo and was previously occupied by the Sumatran tiger exhibit and a large aviary for European birds (Europe on the Edge). Madagascar comprises three animal exhibits linked by winding visitor pathways. The first and second exhibits house fossa, which bred for the first time at the zoo in 2022, and critically endangered Coquerel's sifaka. The third and largest exhibit is a walkthrough lemur enclosure which houses ring tailed lemurs, red ruffed lemurs, crowned lemurs, red-bellied lemurs and black lemurs.

=== Himalayas ===
Blue Zone

The Zoo's Himalayan habitat opened in March 2024 and is designed around a purpose-built, immersive exhibit for snow leopards. The exihibit is modelled on the rocky terrain of the cat's natural habitat and includes rocky cliffs, air-cooled caves and two outdoor areas with glass viewing windows. Male Nashin and female Nubra are the first snow leopards to be held at Chester and were sourced from European zoos as part of a global conservation breeding programme. They produced a female cub, Bheri, in 2025. Other species on show in the Himalayan zone include red pandas and Lord Derby's parakeets.

=== Other exhibits ===
Bordering the onager and cheetah habitats is a waterway running north-south along which the water bus formerly travelled, past island groups of white-faced sakis, Alaotran bamboo lemurs and howler monkeys. A variety of callitrichids, including cotton-top tamarins, were formerly housed on the Bamboo lemur Island, whilst the howler monkey and white-faced saki exhibits were formerly home to black-and-white ruffed lemurs and red ruffed lemurs. A nearby island viewable from Bats Bridge was previously home to lowland anoa and is now home to babirusa. In the southeast corner of the zoo are enclosures housing an assortment of animals, including red pandas, Southern pudu, Cabot's tragopans and the wetland bird nursery. The former cassowary exhibit next to the anteaters was redeveloped in 2016.

Near the off-show Rare Parrot Breeding Centre is an aviary currently housing brown wood owls that was formerly home to macaws and keas. The remainder of the zoo's owl collection are house in aviaries near June's Food Court and great green macaws can be found near the Tropical Realm.

== Former exhibits ==
=== Europe on the Edge ===
This was the zoo's largest aviary, and was one of the biggest in the UK. It was opened in 1993 on the site of the former polar bear enclosure. It housed a variety of European birds, including European black vultures and griffon vultures, and the rarer of the two European storks, the black stork. Wading birds also featured, including spoonbills, ibises and egrets as well as a selection of waterfowl. Smaller birds included rock doves, northern lapwings, red-legged partridges and the native but rare red-billed chough. It was demolished in 2019 to make way for Madagascar Forest.

=== Mkomazi National Park Painted Dogs Conserve ===
In 2011, a new exhibit housing African wild dogs on the site of the former Przewalski's horse paddock was opened. In the style of an African Research Station with an African Village, the exhibit has a dry landscape with fake kopje stones. Joining the pack of African wild dogs in secondary exhibits are aardvarks and rock hyraxes. The exhibit was incorporated into the Heart of Africa development in 2025 and the aardvark exhibit relocated.

=== Aquarium ===
The aquarium, built by George Mottershead's daughter and son-in-law, was a small, traditional building which opened to the public in 1952. It housed a varied collection of freshwater and marine fish, aquatic invertebrates and amphibians. It has had notable success breeding seahorses and achieved the first captive breeding of the freshwater motoro stingray. Other notable fish include epaulette sharks, mudskippers and Lake Malawi cichlids. The aquarium closed in September 2025 due to safety concerns raised by structural engineers. All fish and aquatic species were moved to new homes around the zoo or cared for behind the scenes. The zoo has announced that a new aquarium will be developed on the site of the former orangutan house.

=== Marmot Mania/Mongoose Mania ===
Marmot Mania opened in 2002 and housed prairie dogs. In 2010, dwarf mongooses replaced the prairie dogs and it was renamed Mongoose Mania. The exhibit featured a network of tunnels beneath the enclosure through which children could crawl, then stand up in plastic domes to view the animals at eye level. The exhibit closed in 2022. Prior to the mongoose and prairie dog exhibits, the area had been a children's petting farm (closed in 2001 after an outbreak of foot-and-mouth disease) and later a picnic lawn.

=== Western paddocks ===
Prior to its redevelopment as Heart of Africa, the west side of the Zoo housed grass paddocks supporting grazing groups of Grevy's zebras, sitatunga, Kirk's dik-diks, scimitar-horned oryx, eastern bongos, lesser kudus and roan antelopes.

The zoo's Przewalski's horses left the collection in 2009 to make way for the African wild dog enclosure. Other animals previously housed here included Père David's deer, red-necked wallabies, ostriches and emus.

== Membership and adoption ==
The zoo has a service that gives people the option of adopting an animal of their choice, they are also given two complimentary tickets to allow them to visit the animals. They can also become members which allows them to visit Chester and a range of other zoos across the UK free of charge for a year. The zoo has over 145,000 members. Every three months, members and adopters receive the zoo magazine on line, which provides updates and information about what is happening at the zoo.

== Television ==
Flamingos filmed by a visitor of the zoo.

During summer 2007, television crews from Granada filmed at Chester for the documentary series Zoo Days, a behind the scenes look at the day-to-day running of the zoo, narrated by Jane Horrocks. British broadcast rights were sold to Five and the first 20-part series began airing on British terrestrial TV on 8 October 2007, transmitting on weekday evenings in a regular 6:30 pm slot. A second 20-part series of Zoo Days was swiftly commissioned and began airing on 3 March 2008. The third 20-part series was broadcast from Colchester Zoo, before returning to Chester for the fourth 20-part series on 10 November 2008.

In 2014 the zoo was the subject of BBC One drama Our Zoo, telling the story of the founding of Chester Zoo by the Mottershead family in the 1930s and featured Lee Ingleby as George Mottershead. During the six-part series, the show reached audiences in excess of five million viewers and was nominated for two national TV awards.

In January 2016, Channel 4 began broadcasting a six-part series, The Secret Life of the Zoo, following the keepers and animals at Chester Zoo and narrated by Olivia Colman from Series 1 to 5 and Tamsin Grieg since Series 6. The first series was a ratings success and was recommissioned for a second series. Series 2 aired at the end of 2016. The show has now run for ten seasons with a compilation series in 2020.

== Gallery ==
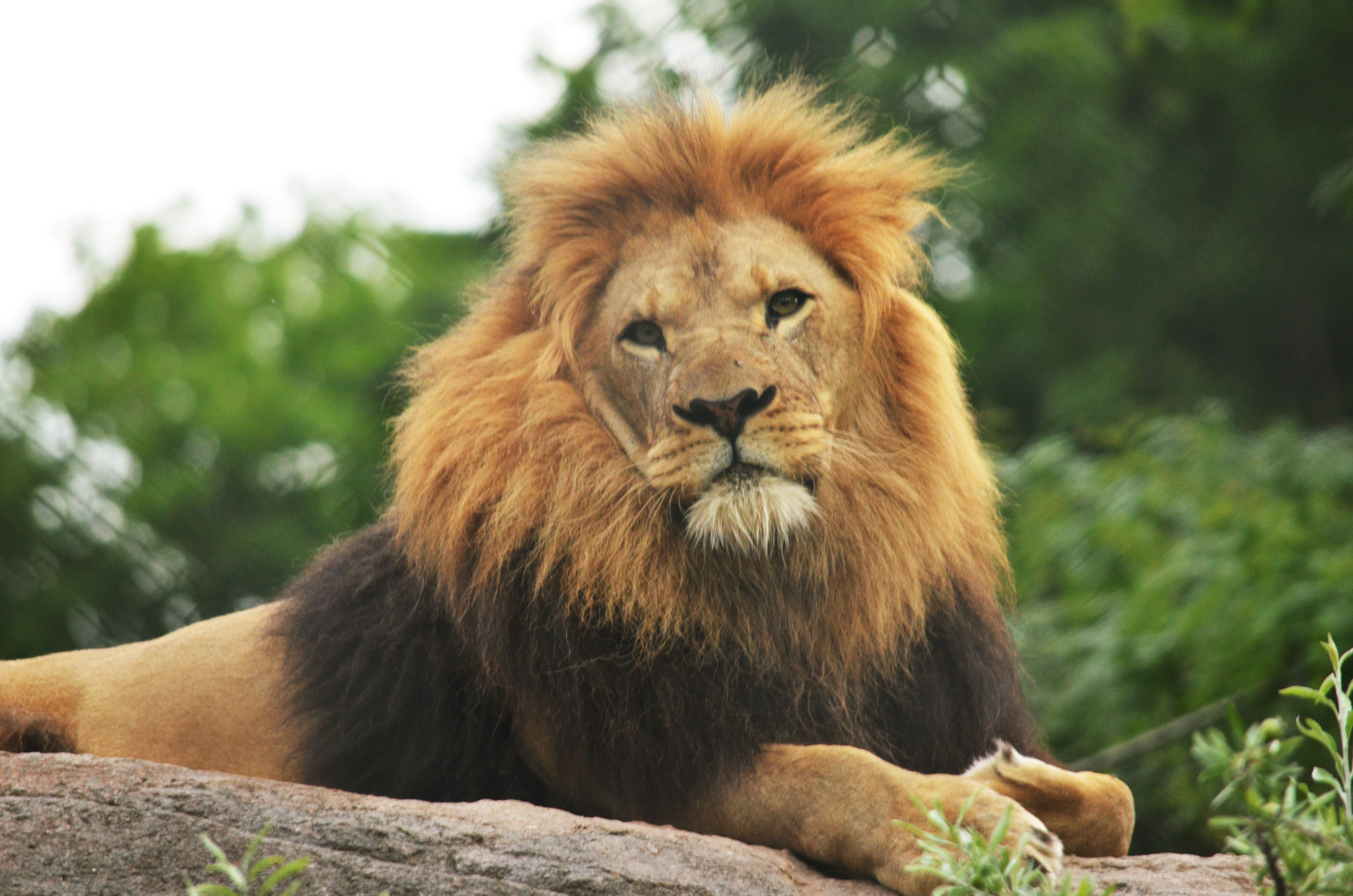
Male Asiatic lion (Panthera leo leo) 'Iblis' (2007-25)

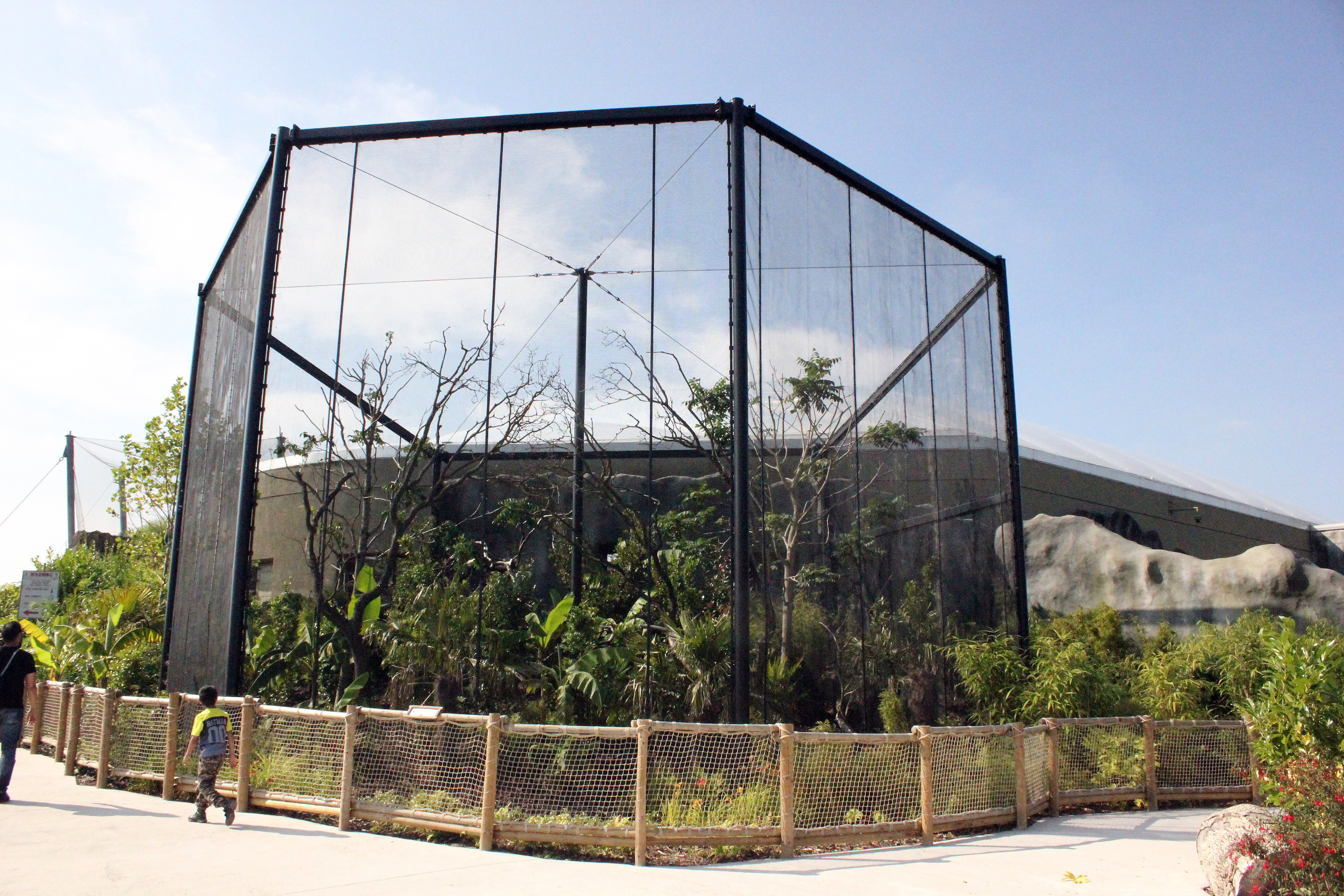
Hornbill aviary in Islands

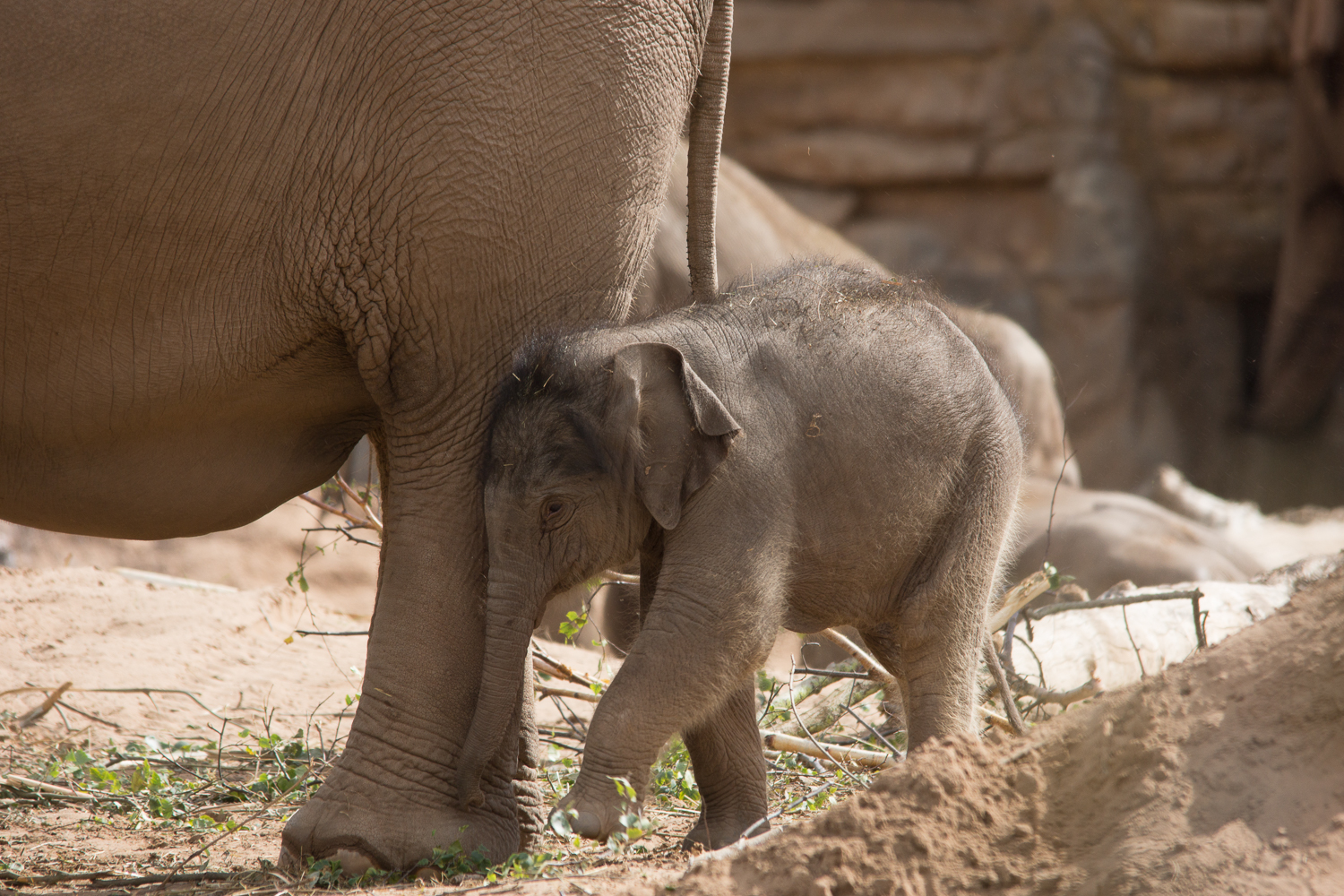
Baby Asian elephant (Elephas maximus) at the Elephants of the Asian Forest

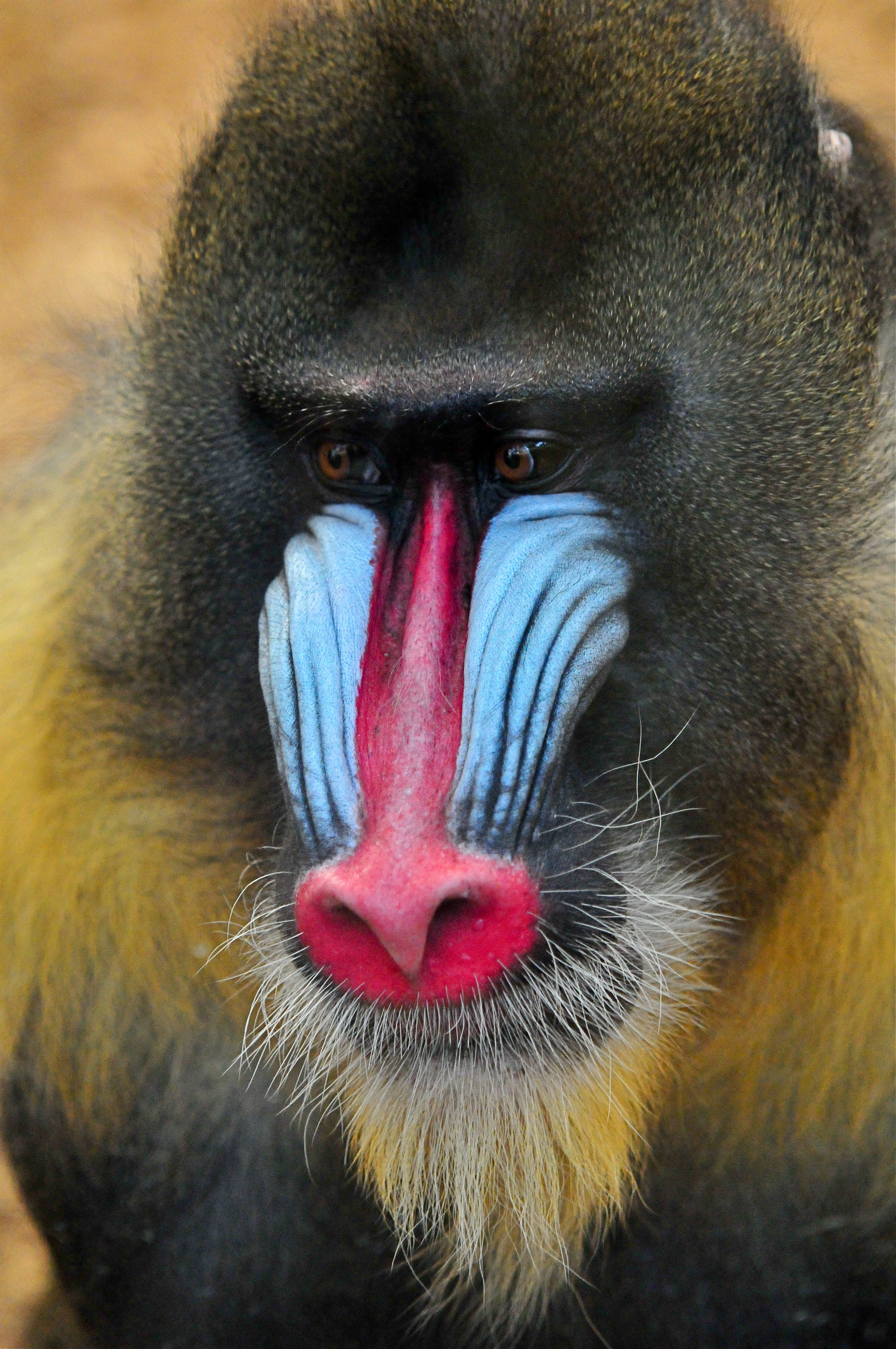
Mandrill (Mandrillus sphinx)

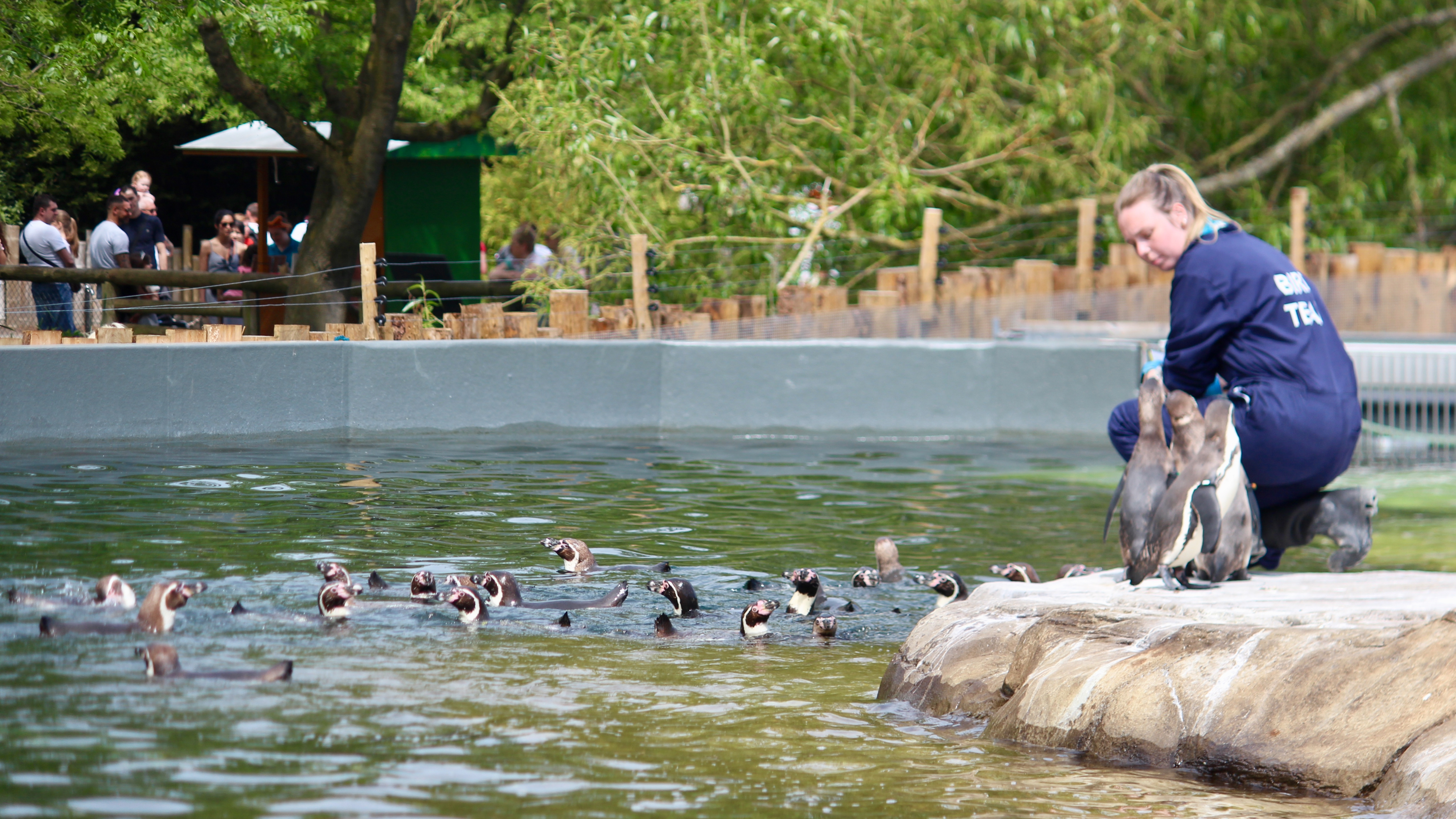
Humboldt penguins (Spheniscus humboldti) with a zookeeper

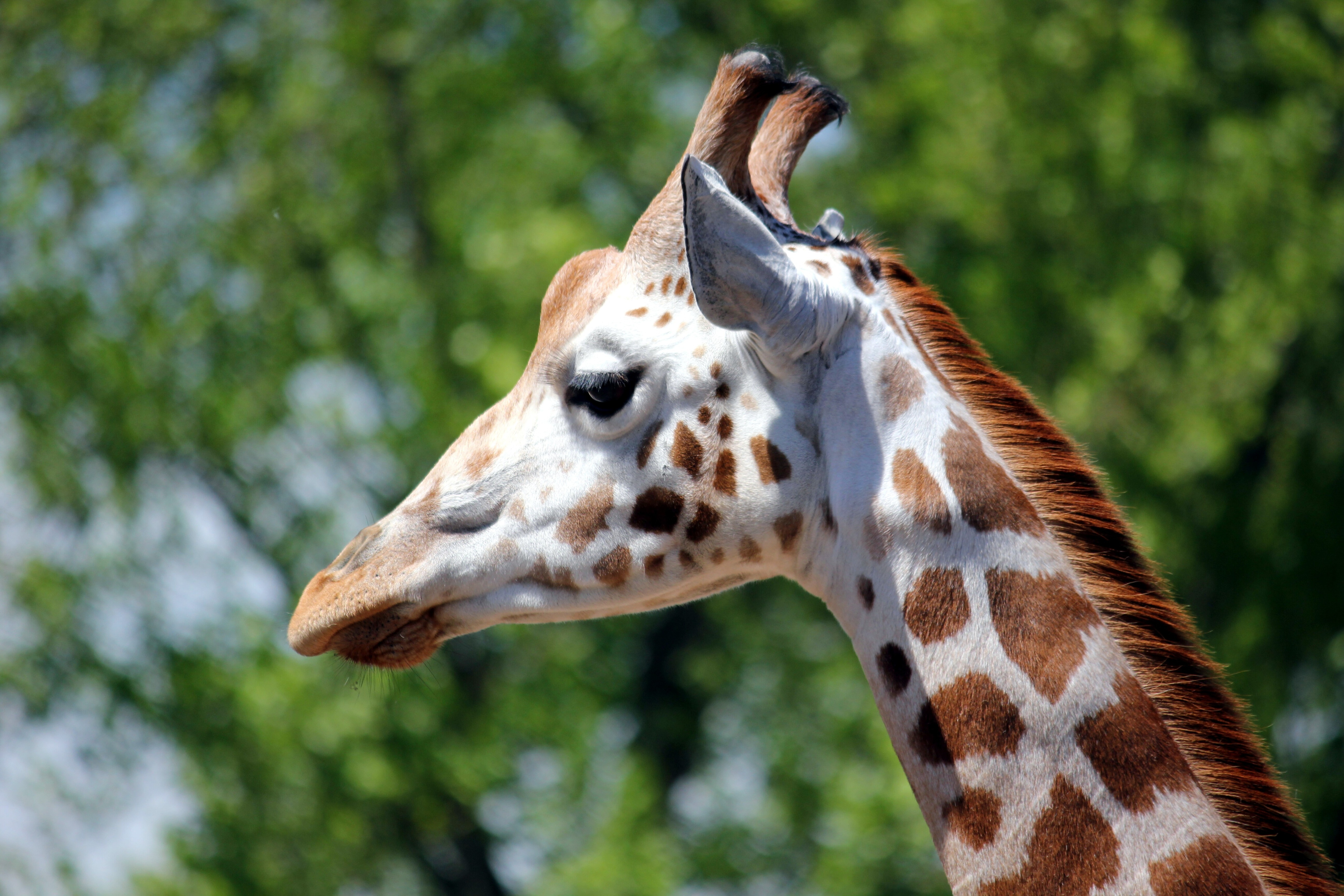
Northern giraffe (Giraffa camelopardalis)

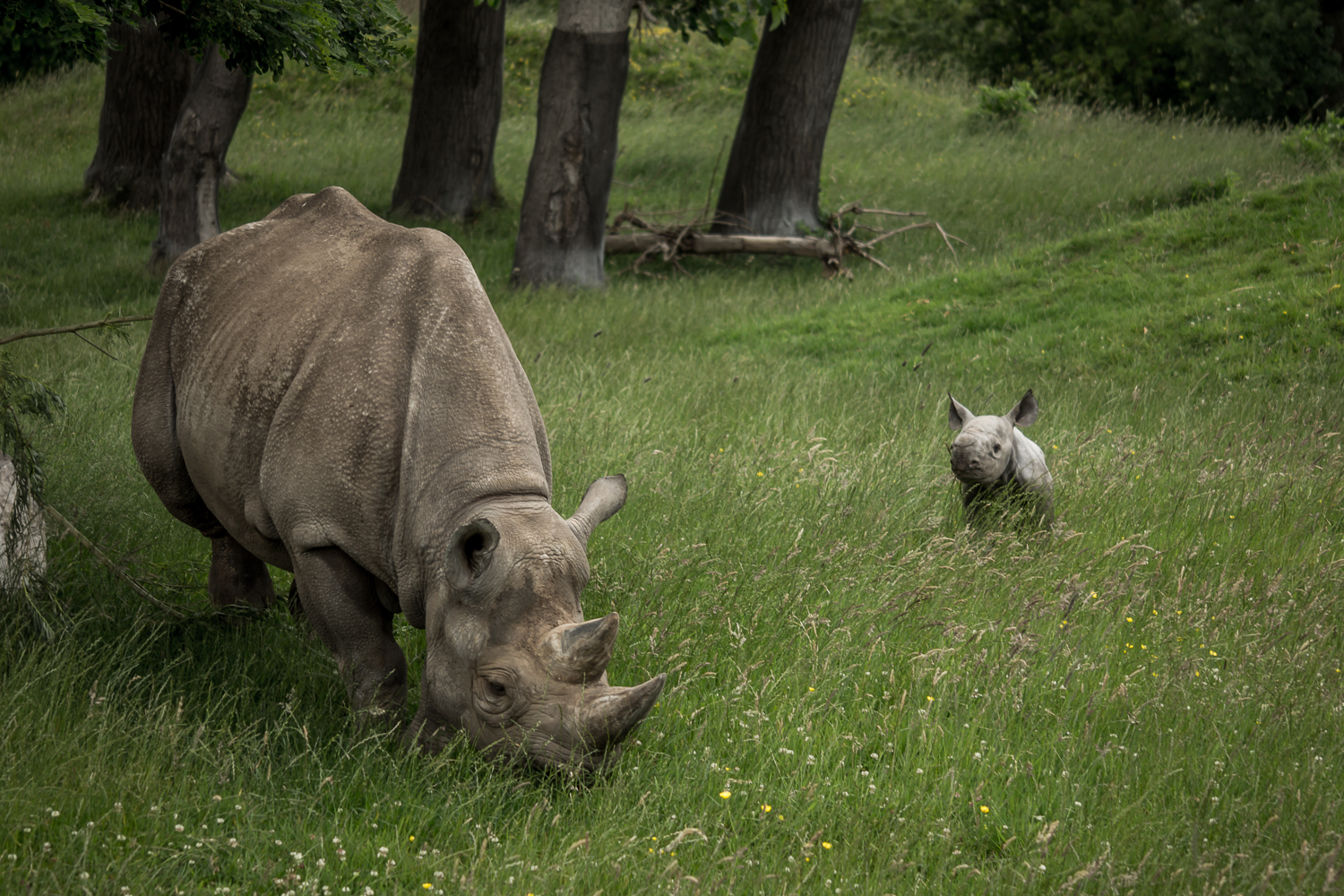
Eastern black rhinoceros (Diceros bicornis michaeli) mother and calf

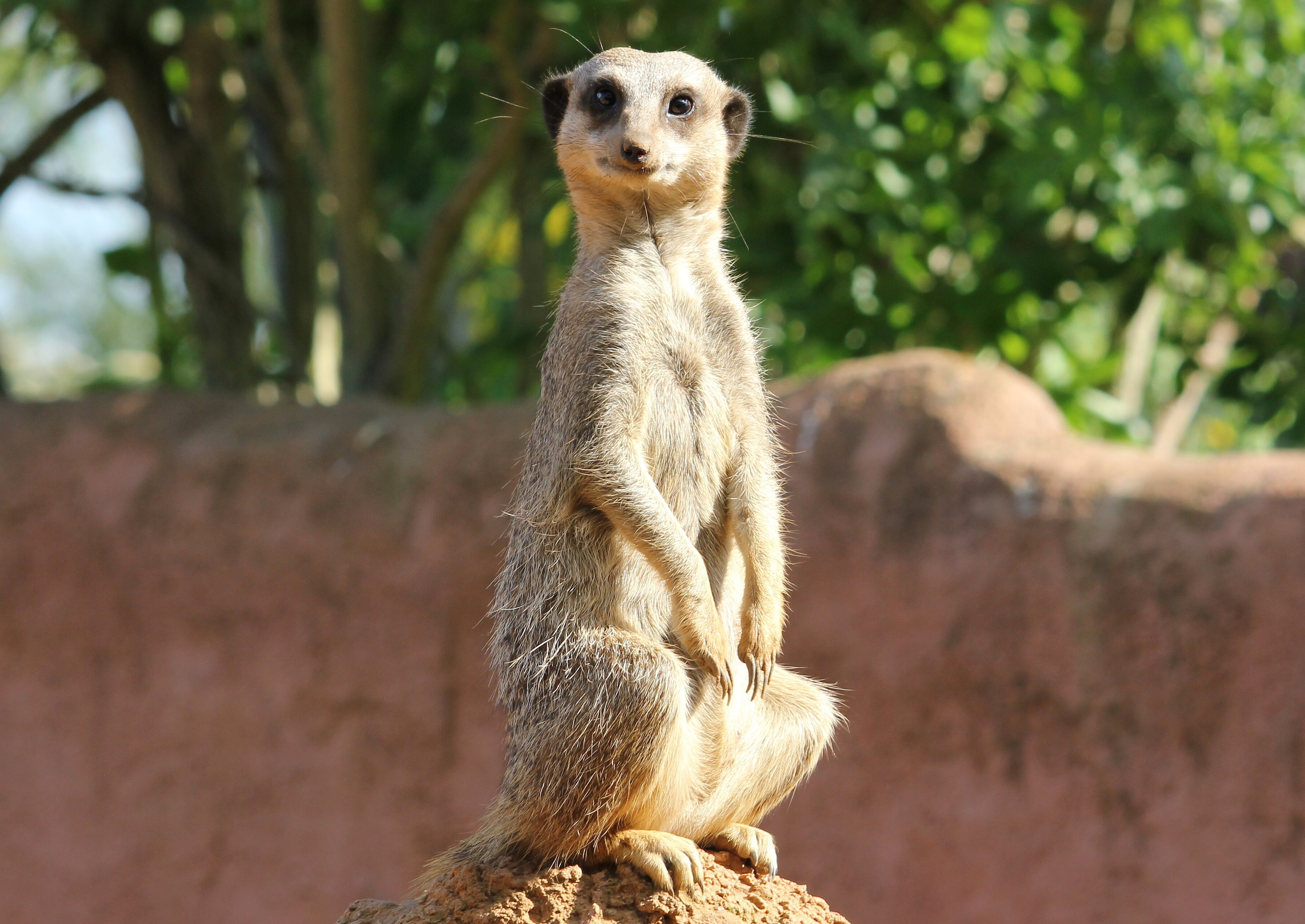
Meerkat (Suricata suricatta)

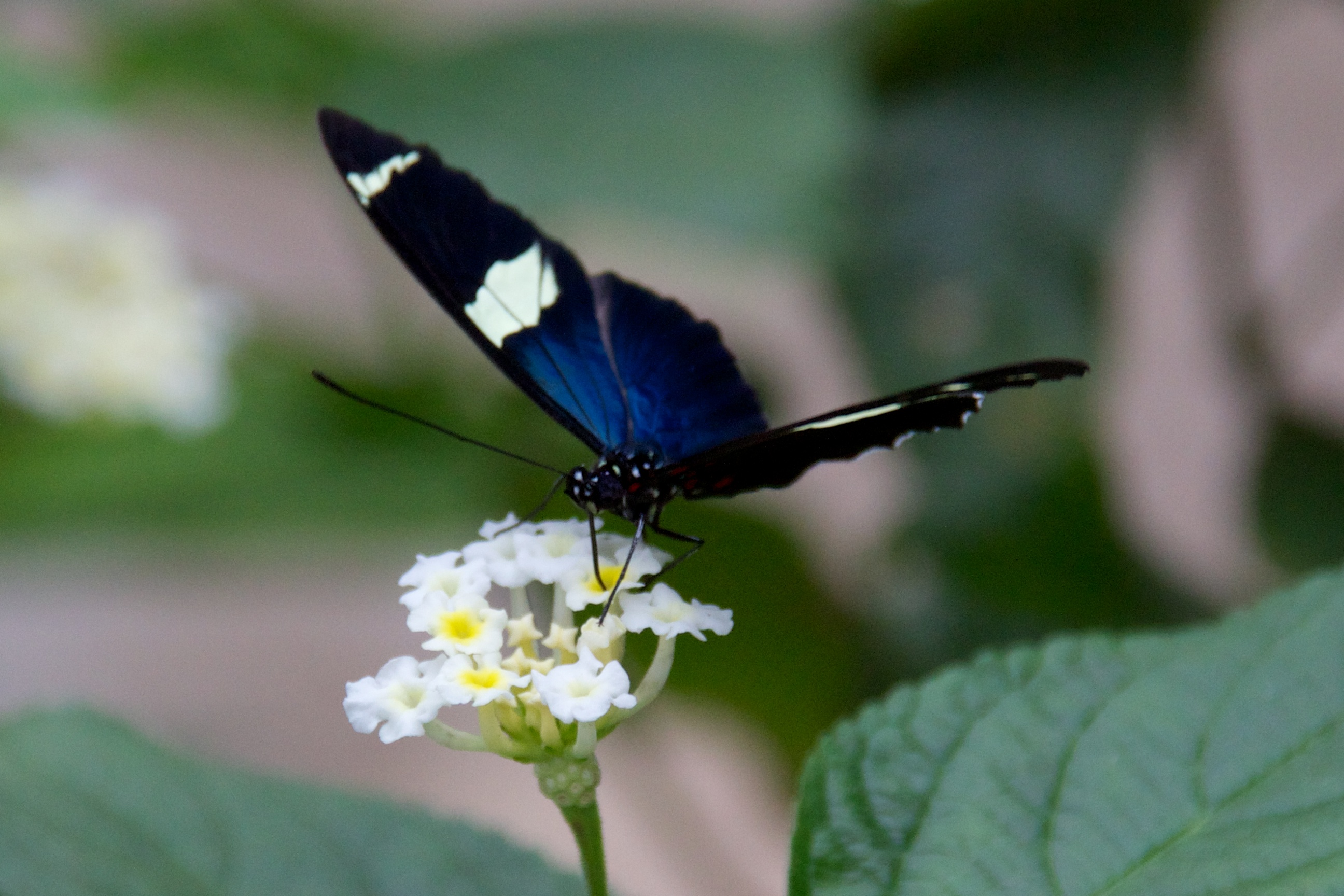
Butterfly in Butterfly Journey

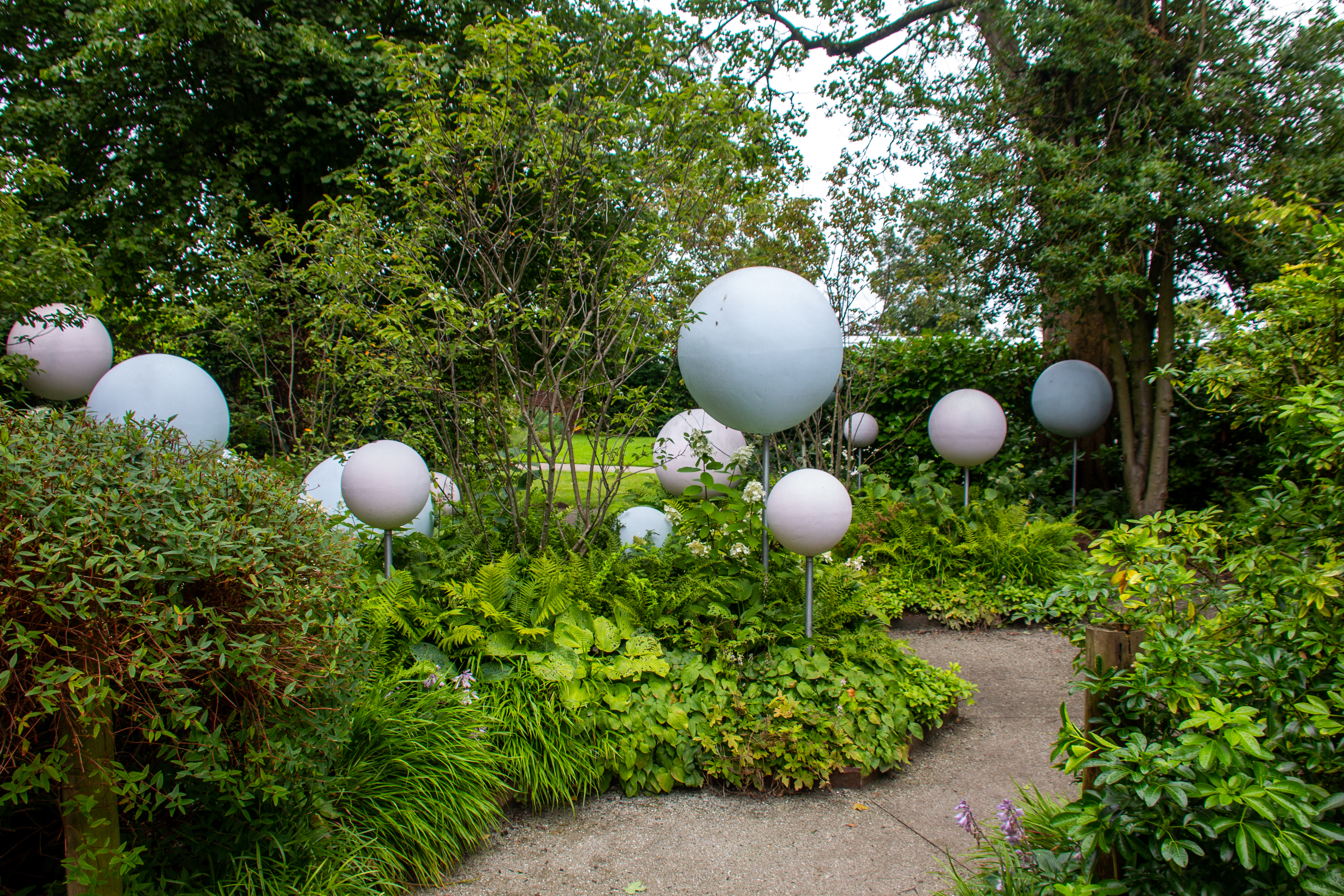
Artwork on a walking path

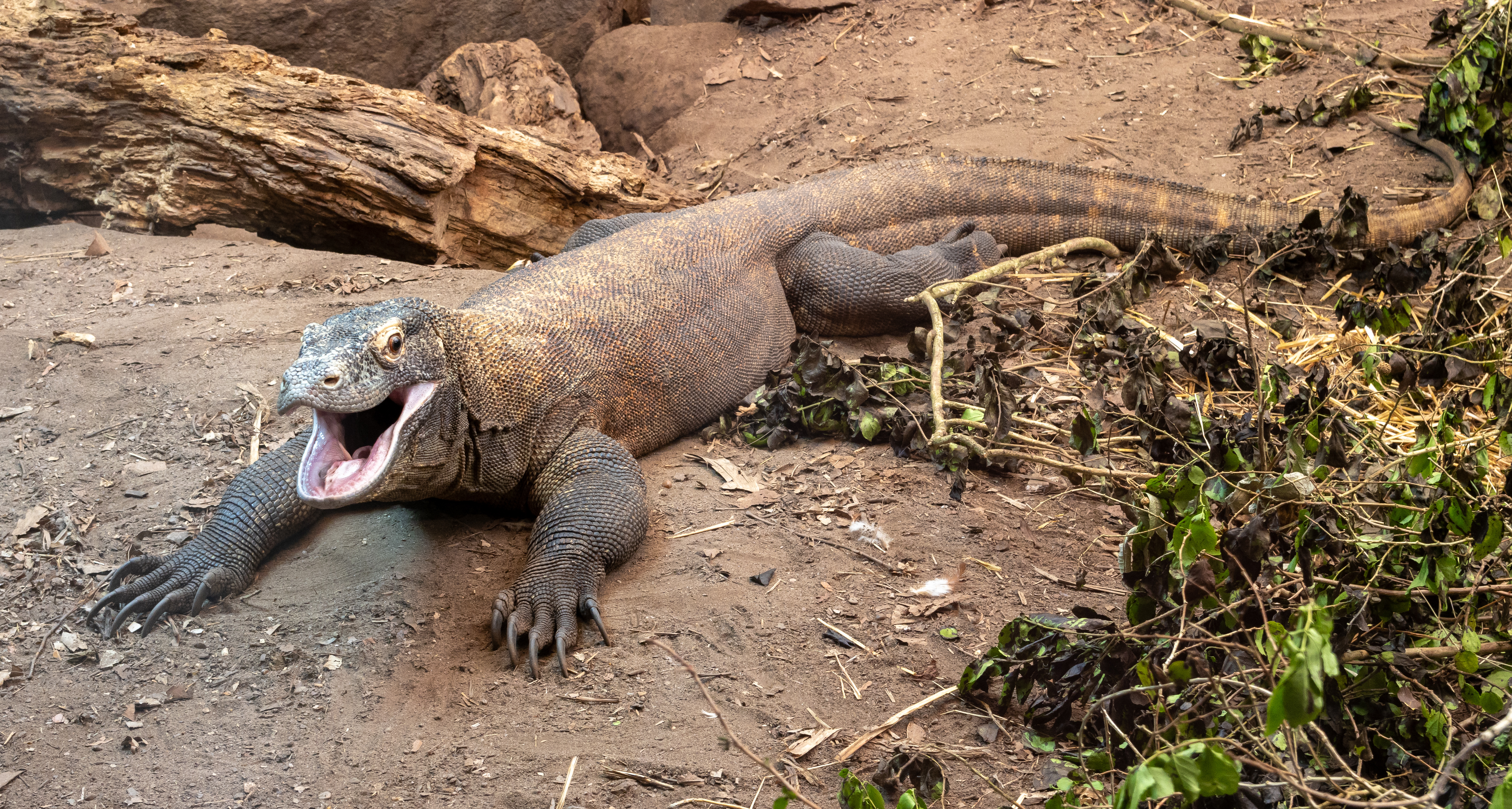
Komodo dragon (Varanus komodoensis) in Dragons in Danger
