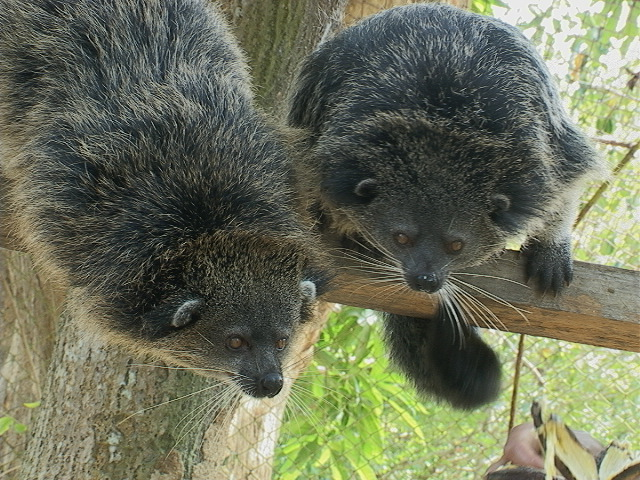

Conservation status
- Vulnerable (IUCN 3.1)

Scientific classification
- Kingdom: Animalia
- Phylum: Chordata
- Class: Mammalia
- Order: Carnivora
- Family: Viverridae
- Genus: Arctictis
- Species: A. binturong
- Subspecies: A. b. whitei

Trinomial name
- Arctictis binturong whitei J. A. Allen, 1910

= Palawan binturong =

Subspecies of carnivore

The Palawan bearcat (Arctictis binturong whitei), also commonly known as the Palawan binturong, is a subspecies of the binturong, a mammal in the family Viverridae. It is endemic to the island of Palawan in the Philippines.

== Description ==
The Palawan binturong can grow to as much as 1.4 m (4.6 ft). Distinguishing characteristics are the ears that are lined with white fur, and long, white whiskers that can be as long as the length of its head. Generally docile when handled, the bearcat nevertheless has sharp claws and teeth that can easily rip through flesh. It can suspend itself by curling its strong prehensile tail around branches. Its vertically oriented pupil indicates that it is a nocturnal animal. It has coarse, thick black-brown fur.

== Behaviour and ecology ==
The Palawan binturong inhabits tropical rainforest habitat. It is an omnivore, feeding on fruit, small animals, and carrion. It is solitary and mostly active at night; it is arboreal, living in forests, including rainforests, as well as agricultural areas and close to human settlements. It is omnivorous, eating a wide range of fruits, insects, small mammals and birds. It communicates using a range of vocalizations like as grunts, hisses, and growls; females give birth to a single young after a 90-day gestation period.The young are born with their eyes closed and are reliant on their mother for the first few months of their lives.

== Conservation ==
Due to its limited distribution, the Palawan binturong may be of conservation concern, and because of its reliance on the forest, it is threatened by deforestation, which is a severe problem in Palawan: Between 2000 and 2017, 11% of the world's forest was lost. Furthermore, Palawan is a hub for illegal wildlife trade, with Palawan binturongs being seized on a regular basis (The IUCN lists the Palawan binturong as Vulnerable; the main threats it faces are destruction and degradation of primary rainforest, hunting for meat, use in traditional medicines and as pets, and accidental or intentional snaring, which is exacerbated by negligible penalties for hunting and trade in some countries. They, like ordinary palm civets (Paradoxurus spp.), are live-trapped and kept in farms in Indonesia for the manufacture of civet coffee, with poor living conditions leading to significant mortality. This subspecies is harvested for the pet trade. In the south of its range it is also taken for human consumption.
