= George Mottershead =

Founder of the Chester Zoo (1894–1978)

George Mottershead OBE
- Born: George Saul Mottershead; 12 June 1894; Sale Moor, Manchester, England
- Died: 5 May 1978 (aged 83); Cheshire, England
- Occupations: Zoo owner; soldier; fitness instructor
- Known for: Chester Zoo
- Spouse: Elizabeth Atkinson (m. 1916; died 1969)
- Children: 2

George Saul Mottershead OBE (12 June 1894 – 5 May 1978) was the founder of Chester Zoo.

== Early life ==
Mottershead was born in Sale Moor, Manchester. His father Albert Mottershead was a botanist and nurseryman. He had two brothers Stanley Saul and Charles Saul, a sister Norah and a half-brother Albert.

Mottershead was taken to Belle Vue Zoological Gardens in Manchester in 1903 as a childhood treat. He disliked seeing the animals confined in cages, and was determined to create a zoo without bars. As a youth, he experimented with aviaries, and tanks and runs for pet lizards and snakes. He left home aged 16 to become a fitness instructor.

== First World War ==
After the outbreak of the First World War, George Mottershead joined the South Lancashire Regiment. At least two of his brothers joined the Manchester Regiment, and they all served on the Western Front in France. While on leave, Mottershead married Elizabeth Atkinson at St Mary Magdalen Church, Ashton-on-Mersey, in 1916. They had two daughters, Muriel (born 1917) and June (born 1926).

In October 1916, at the Battle of the Somme, Mottershead suffered a bullet wound to his neck, injuring his spine. He was initially paralysed, and recuperated at Highfield Military Hospital in Knotty Ash. Contrary to the expected medical prognosis he eventually recovered the ability to walk (with a limp) after three years in a wheelchair.

His brothers, Albert and Stanley Mottershead, were killed in the war. Lance Corporal Albert Mottershead was killed in October 1916 and is commemorated on the Tyne Cot Memorial; Private Stanley Mottershead died in December 1916 and is buried at Douchy-lès-Ayette war cemetery. Both are also commemorated on the war memorial at St Anne's Church, Sale Moor and the Sale war memorial.

His brother Charles served with the Royal Flying Corps's School of Technical Training.

== Chester Zoo ==
With his parents and young family, Mottershead moved to Shavington in the 1920s, and operated a successful market garden and florist, later selling pet birds. He started to show his stock of birds and his private collection of animals to the paying public.

The Mottershead family moved to the Oakfield Estate in Upton-by-Chester in December 1930, paying £3,500 for a 9 acres (3.6 ha) site including Oakfield Manor, built around 1885 for Benjamin Chafers Roberts and now a Grade II listed building. They acquired two Himalayan black bears from a wildlife park in Matlock, and added monkeys, chimpanzees, birds, and reptiles. The local residents were concerned about the potential dangers of escaped animals but, after a public inquiry, the Ministry of Health granted permission to open the zoo in April 1931, and Chester Zoo opened to the public on 10 June 1931. Mottershead founded the "North of England Zoological Society" in 1934. The zoo continued through the Second World War, accepting its first pair of elephants from a circus in 1941.

== Recognition ==
Mottershead was appointed an Officer of the Order of the British Empire (OBE) in the 1973 New Year Honours. He was also awarded an honorary degree of Master of Science, and served as president of the International Union of Directors of Zoological Gardens (now the World Association of Zoos and Aquariums).

After his death, his ashes were scattered on the zoo memorial garden dedicated to his wife Elizabeth who died in 1969. The garden is now the Chinese garden at the zoo.

The story of George Mottershead's founding of Chester Zoo is the subject of a 2014 BBC television drama serial, Our Zoo. Mottershead is portrayed by Lee Ingleby.
