= Bluecoat school =

Type of charity school in England

A bluecoat school is a type of charity school in England and Ireland the first of which was founded in the 16th century. Most of them have closed; some remain open as schools, often on different sites, and some of the original buildings have been adapted for other purposes. They are known as "bluecoat schools" because of the distinctive blue uniform originally worn by their pupils. The colour blue was traditionally the colour of charity and was a common colour for clothing at the time. The uniform included a full-length blue coat and yellow stockings with white bands.

== History ==
The first bluecoat school to be established was Christ's Hospital. This was founded by King Edward VI in Newgate Street, London, in 1552, as a foundling hospital to care for and educate poor children. Between the 16th and late 18th centuries about 60 similar institutions were established in different parts of England. These were not connected with Christ's Hospital, but if their pupils wore the blue uniform, they were known as bluecoat schools. The original Christ's Hospital, while retaining its name, has moved its site to West Sussex and developed into an independent school, with much of its costs being met by a charitable foundation.

== Schools ==
Name	Location	Founded	Closed	Notes	Refs
St Mary's School	Banbury	1705		A primary school	
Basingstoke Blue Coat School	Basingstoke	1646 by Richard Aldworth	1888		
Bluecoat School	Bath	1711 by Richard Nelson	By 1921	The building was replaced in 1859.	
Birmingham Blue Coat School	Birmingham	1722		An independent junior prep school	
Queen Elizabeth's Hospital	Bristol (Clifton)	1586		also known as The City School	
Bluecoat School	Parish Lane, Penge, Bromley, London	1841	1968	Alexandra Nursery (Garden Centre)	
Bluecoat School	Chester	1717	1949	Its name has been incorporated in Bishops' Blue Coat Church of England High School, Chester.	
Oliver Whitby School	Chichester	1702	1949	Foundation now supports scholars at Christ's Hospital and at Chichester Prebendal School.	
Coventry Blue Coat Church of England School	Coventry	1714		a comprehensive school	
The King's Hospital	Dublin (Palmerstown)	1669		also known as The Blue Coat School	
Bluecoat School CofE Junior School	Durham	1708		Founded in 1708 by local traders and began above a pub ("Ye Bull's Head") in the corner of the market place near St Nicholas' Church and stayed there until 1811. Now housed in a modern building in Newton Hall. Serves ages 7-11 as the Junior School for Newton Hall Infants.	
The Blue Coat School	Dudley	1869	1989		
Sir Thomas Rich's School	Gloucester	1666		a grammar school	
Bishop of Hereford's Bluecoat School	Hereford	1973			
Christ's Hospital	Horsham	1552 by King Edward VI		the first and oldest surviving bluecoat school, known as The Bluecoat School	
Stanhope School	Lewisham	1715 by George Stanhope	1894	Merged with Addey School in 1894 to form Addey and Stanhope School, still extant	
Lincoln Christ's Hospital School	Lincoln	1602/1614		Set up under the will of Dr Richard Smith, who died in 1602, but established in 1614 in the St Mary's Guildhall, Moved to Christ's Hospital Terrace Lincoln in 1623 where the boys school continued until 1883, when the endowment was transferred to a new Christ's Hospital Girls school. Became Grammar School in 1906 and a state comprehensive in 1974	
Liverpool Blue Coat School	Liverpool	1708 by Bryan Blundell		a grammar school formerly at Bluecoat Chambers, moved to Wavertree in 1906	
Blue Coat School	Northampton	1755 by the Earl of Northampton	1811	Merged with the Orange School and the Green Coat School to form the Corporation Charity School. In 1923 this closed and funded the Blue Coat Corporation Charity School Foundation	
The Nottingham Bluecoat Academy	Nottingham	1706		a church school	
The Blue Coat School	Oldham	1834			
Pilton Bluecoat Academy	Pilton, Devon			a junior school	
Reading Blue Coat School	Reading	1646		a secondary school	
Boys' Charity School	Sheffield	1706	1939	Popularly known as the Bluecoat School	
Bluecoat Primary School & Nursery	Stamford, Lincolnshire	18th century			
Old Swinford Hospital	Stourbridge	1667		Formerly sometimes called "Foley's Blue Coat School" or "Foley's Blue Coat Hospital"	
Old Bluecoat School	Thatcham	1707	1914	Housed in a former chapel built in 1304	
Blue Coat Church of England Academy	Walsall	1656		"Founded in 1656 as a charity school for orphans and deprived children in the borough."	
Warrington Blue Coat School,	Warrington	1665	1948		
The Blue School	Wells, Somerset	1641 by Ezekiel Barkham			
Blewcoat School	Westminster	1709	1926	During World War II, the building was used by the American services as a store. Afterwards, the Girl Guides used it as a youth club. When the National Trust bought it in 1954, it was used as their membership and head office. Later, it was converted into a gift shop. June 2014 saw the opening of British designer Ian Stuart's boutique in the building, selling bridal gowns, special occasion wear and evening gown collections.	
Blue Coat Church of England School	Symn Lane, Wotton-under-Edge, Gloucestershire	1693			
York Bluecoat School	York	1705	1947		

== See also ==
- Bluecoat, type of school uniform
- Bluecoat (disambiguation)
