= List of the oldest schools in the United Kingdom =

This list of the oldest schools in the United Kingdom contains extant schools in the United Kingdom established prior to 1800. The dates refer to the foundation or the earliest documented contemporary reference to the school. In many cases the date of the original foundation is uncertain. For concision, schools whose date is cited on their own page in Wikipedia are not cited again here. Though not in the United Kingdom, one school (Elizabeth College) in Guernsey – a Crown dependency – is included in this list.

== England ==
=== Sixth century ===
- The King's School, Canterbury (abbey founded in 597, new royal charter in 1541)

=== Seventh century ===
- The King's School, Rochester (founded in 604, new royal charter in 1541)
- St Peter's School, York (627, new royal charter 1550s)
- Thetford Grammar School (631, mentioned 1114, refounded 1566)
- Hereford Cathedral School (676, mentioned 1384)
- The Pilgrims' School, Winchester (676)
- Royal Grammar School Worcester (685, first conclusive evidence 1291, Royal charter 1561)
- Trinity School, Carlisle, formerly Carlisle Grammar School (priory school founded 685)
- Beverley Grammar School (c.700)

=== Eighth century ===
- Sherborne School (705, royal charter 1550)

=== Tenth century ===
- Warwick School (914, royal charter 1545)
- Wells Cathedral School (909)
- St Albans School (c.948, refounded 1549)
- The Minster School, Southwell (minster founded 956, first mention 1313, refounded 1547)
- King's Ely (970)

=== Eleventh century ===
- Bedford School (1086, refounded 1552)
- Salisbury Cathedral School (1091)
- Norwich School (1096, refounded 1547 as "King Edward VI Grammar School")
- Abingdon School (possibly as old as 1100, endowed 1256, refounded 1563)

=== Twelfth century ===
- St Paul's Cathedral School (founded 1123)
- The High School of Glasgow (founded 1124)
- Colchester Royal Grammar School (1128, Royal Charters 1539, re-founded 1584)
- Reading School (1125 as the school of Reading Abbey, refounded 1486, Royal charter 1541, closed in the 1860s, re-opened 1871)
- The King's School, Pontefract (1139, refounded 1548)
- Bristol Cathedral School (abbey founded 1140, refounded 1542)
- Exeter Cathedral School (founded 1179)

=== Thirteenth century ===
- Lancaster Royal Grammar School (mention of master 1235, endowed 1472)
- Kingston Grammar School (chapel founded 13th Century, refounded 1561)
- Louth Grammar School (earliest reference 1276, refounded 1551 as King Edward VI Grammar School, Louth)
- King Edward VI School, Stratford-upon-Avon (1295 The Guild of the Holy Cross School, refounded 1553 as King Edward VI School, Stratford-upon-Avon)

=== Fourteenth century ===
- Stamford School (1309, re-endowed 1532)
- Northallerton School (1323)
- Hanley Castle High School (chantry school 1326, charter 1544)
- The King's School, Grantham (1329, refounded 1528)
- Hull Grammar School (1330 and endowed 1479 by John Alcock, Bishop of Worcester. Renamed Tranby School in 2021)
- Bourne Grammar School (earliest record of existence 1330, endowed 1636)
- The King's School, Ottery St Mary (1335, refounded 1545)
- St George's School, Windsor Castle (1348)
- Doncaster Grammar School now Hall Cross School, (first record of existence 1350)
- Beauchamp College (first record of existence 1359)
- Westminster School (first record of existence 1371, Royal charter 1541 and 1560)
- Prince Henry's High School (c. 1376, refounded 1605)
- New College School (1379)
- Wisbech Grammar School (1379, Royal charter 1549)
- Winchester College (1382)
- Katharine Lady Berkeley's School (Royal licence in 1384)
- Penistone Grammar School (1392)
- Ipswich School (1399, Royal Charter 1566)

=== Fifteenth century ===
- Oswestry School (1407)
- Durham School (1414, refounded 1541)
- Chorister School (1416)
- Royal Latin School (first mention 1423, Royal charter 1548)
- Sponne School (chantry founded 1430)
- Sevenoaks School (1432)
- Chipping Campden School (c1440)
- Eton College (1440)
- King's College School, Cambridge (1441)
- City of London School (1442)
- Bridlington School (1447)
- Hartismere School (founded 1451)
- St. Bartholomew's School, Newbury (1466)
- Bromsgrove School (record of a chantry school 1476, re-founded 1553)
- Magdalen College School, Oxford (1480)
- Thomas Rotherham College (1483)
- Stockport Grammar School (1487)
- Pott Shrigley Church School (1492)
- Ermysted's Grammar School (record of a chantry school 1492, re-founded 1548)
- Lichfield Grammar School (1495, refounded as King Edward VI School, Lichfield )
- Loughborough Grammar School (1495)
- The Prebendal School (1497)
- Queen Elizabeth's School, Wimborne Minster (1497)
- Giggleswick School (1499, Royal charter 1553)

=== Sixteenth century ===
- The King's School in Macclesfield (1502)
- Bridgnorth Endowed School (1503)
- Queen Elizabeth's Grammar School, Blackburn (1509)
- St Paul's School (London) (1509)
- Royal Grammar School, Guildford (1509)
- Wolverhampton Grammar School (1512)
- Lewes Old Grammar School Lewes, East Sussex founded as Southover Grammar School (1512)
- Holy Trinity Church of England Primary School, Cuckfield, West Sussex founded as Cuckfield Grammar School (1512)
- Hutton Grammar School, Lancashire (1512)
- Nottingham High School (1513)
- Pocklington School (1514)
- Manchester Grammar School (1515)
- Gillingham School (1516)
- Bolton School (before 1516)
- Cranbrook School, Kent (1518)
- King's School, Bruton (1519)
- Coleshill School (1520)
- Hackney Free (1520) later renamed The Urswick School
- John Mayne School, Biddenden (1522)
- Kirkbie Kendal School founded as Kendal Grammar School (1525)
- Royal Grammar School, Newcastle (1525)
- Sedbergh School (1525)
- Boteler Grammar School (1526)
- Bishop Vesey's Grammar School (1527)
- Queen Elizabeth's Grammar School, Faversham (1527)
- Bingley Grammar School (1529)
- Dame Bradbury’s, Saffron Walden, England (1521), refounding school present at site since 1317
- Magnus C of E School (1531)
- Bristol Grammar School (1532)
- Stamford School (1532)
- The College of Richard Collyer (1532)
- Coopers' Company and Coborn School (1536)
- Elizabethan Grammar School now Wyggeston and Queen Elizabeth I College (1536)
- The Crypt School, Gloucester (1539)
- Berkhamsted School (1541)
- The King's School, Chester (1541)
- The King's School, Gloucester (1541) (Dates from the 11th century)
- The King's School, Peterborough (1541)
- The King's School, Worcester (1541)
- Northampton Grammar School (1541) - later renamed to Northampton School for Boys
- Dauntsey's School (1542)
- Prescot Grammar School (1544)
- King Henry VIII School, Coventry (1545)
- Christ Church Cathedral School (1546)
- Archbishop Holgate's School, York (1546)
- Colyton Grammar School (1546)
- King James's School, Almondbury (1547)
- Malton School (1547)
- Queen Elizabeth's School, Crediton founded as 'The Kyng's Newe Gramer Scole of Credyton' (1547)
- Bradford Grammar School (1548)
- Magdalen College School, Brackley (1548)
- Maidstone Grammar School (1549)
- Kirkham Grammar School (1549)
- King Edward VI Academy, Spilsby (1550)
- King Edward VI School (Bury St Edmunds) (1550)
- Sherborne School (1550, early 8th century)
- King Edward VI Grammar School (Chelmsford) (1551)
- Royal Grammar School, High Wycombe (1551) (Royal Charter 1562)
- King Edward VI Grammar School, Louth (1551) (possibly 1276)
- King Edward VI Grammar School, Retford, currently Retford Oaks Academy (1551)
- Bedford School (1552, earliest record 1086)
- Christ's Hospital (1552)
- King Edward VI College, Nuneaton (1552)
- King Edward's School, Bath (1552)
- King Edward's School, Birmingham (1552)
- King Edward VI Grammar School, Stourbridge (1552) (formerly a chantry school 1430) (became Sixth Form College 1976)
- The King Edward VI School, Morpeth (1552) (formerly a chantry school, established in the 14th century, abolished in 1547)
- Leeds Grammar School (1552)
- Shrewsbury School (1552)
- Hutton Grammar School (1552)
- King Edward's School, Witley (1553)
- King Edward VI School, Southampton (1553)
- Tonbridge School (1553)
- Clitheroe Royal Grammar School (1554)
- King Edward VI Community College, Totnes (1554)
- Queen Mary's Grammar School, Walsall (1554)
- Boston Grammar School (1555)
- Gresham's School (1555)
- Ripon Grammar School (refounded 1555, although thought to date from the 7th century)
- Hampton School (1556)
- Oundle School (1556)
- Queen Mary's College, Basingstoke (1556)
- Tadcaster Grammar School (1557)
- Repton School (1557)
- Hampton School (1557)
- Sir John Deane's College, Northwich, Cheshire (formerly Sir John Deane's Grammar School) (1557)
- Brentwood School (1558)
- Enfield Grammar School (1558)
- Alleyne's High School, Stone, Staffordshire (1558)
- The Thomas Alleyne School, Stevenage, Hertfordshire (1558)
- Thomas Alleyne's High School, Uttoxeter, Staffordshire. (1558)
- Bablake School (1560)
- Solihull School (1560)
- Westminster Abbey Choir School (1560)
- Kingston Grammar School (1561)
- Merchant Taylors' School (1561)
- Queen Elizabeth's Academy (1561)
- Prior Pursglove and Stockton Sixth Form College (1561) (initial founding of Guisborough Grammar School, became Prior Pursglove College 1971, merged with Stockton College 2016)
- St Saviour's Grammar School (1562) (merged with St Olave's Grammar School in 1896)
- Sir Roger Manwood's School (1563)
- Queen Elizabeth Grammar School, Penrith (1564)
- Felsted School (1564)
- Bungay Grammar School (1565)
- Highgate School (1565)
- Huntingdon Grammar School (1565) (now Hinchingbrooke School)
- King Charles I School (1566)
- Queen Elizabeth's Grammar School, Alford (1566)
- Rivington and Blackrod Grammar School, Rivington (1566) (now Rivington and Blackrod High School)
- Bedford Modern School (1566)
- Ashby School (1567)
- Rugby School (1567)
- Richmond Grammar School (1568) (Earliest record 1361)
- Colfe's School (1568) refounded (1652)
- St Edmund's College (1568) (Oldest Catholic school in England)
- The Thomas Hardye School, Dorchester, Dorset (1569) (formerly Dorchester Free School)
- Bury Grammar School (1570)
- Queen Elizabeth's Grammar School, Horncastle (1571)
- St Olave's Grammar School (1571)
- St Mary Redcliffe School (1571) (merged with Temple Colston School for girls (1709) and is now St Mary Redcliffe and Temple School)
- Burford School (1571)
- Harrow School (1572)
- Netherthorpe School (1572)
- Queen Elizabeth's Grammar School, Barnet (1573)
- Appleby Grammar School (charter granted by Elizabeth I in 1574)
- Pate's Grammar School (1574)
- Lord Williams's School (1575)
- Dartford Grammar School (1576)
- Sutton Valence School (1576)
- Woodbridge School (1587)
- The Dronfield Henry Fanshawe School (1579) (endowed 1564)
- St. Bees School (1583)
- Oakham School (1584)
- Uppingham School (1584)
- Queen Elizabeth's Grammar School, Ashbourne (1585)
- Ashton Grammar School, Seneley Green (1588)
- Joyce Frankland Academy, England (1588) (formerly Newport Free Grammar School)
- Spalding Grammar School (1588)
- Queen Elizabeth's High School (1589)
- Conyers' School (1590)
- Queen Elizabeth's Hospital (1590)
- Queen Elizabeth School, Kirkby Lonsdale (1591)
- Queen Elizabeth Grammar School, Wakefield (1591)
- Lymm High School (1592)
- Stonyhurst College (1593)
- Emanuel School (1594)
- Wellingborough School (1595)
- Whitgift School (1596)
- Aldenham School (1597)
- Heath Grammar School (1597) (merged with former The Crossley and Porter School (1881) and is now The Crossley Heath School)
- King Alfred's Academy, Wantage (1597)
- Aylesbury Grammar School (1598)
- Queen Elizabeth High School, Hexham (1599)
- Kimbolton School (1531, earliest references, 1600 accepted)

=== Seventeenth century ===
- Dixie Grammar School (1601)
- Burnsall Primary School (1602), founded as grammar school, then became "all-age" (5–13) and now primary.
- Blundell's School (1604)
- Carre's Grammar School (1604)
- Newcastle-under-Lyme School (c.1604)
- Sheffield Grammar School (1604) (became King Edward VII School in 1905)
- Downside School (1606)
- Marlwood School (1606)
- Paston College (1606)
- Clarke's Grammar School (1606)
- Ilkley Grammar School (1607)
- Prince Henry's Grammar School, Otley (1607)
- Charterhouse School (1611)
- Batley Grammar School (1612)
- Dame Alice Owen's School (1613)
- Heversham School (1613)
- Steyning Grammar School (1614)
- Wolsingham School (1614) originally Wolsingham Grammar School
- Godshill Primary School (1615), originally Godshill Grammar School
- The Perse School (1615)
- Wilson's School (1615)
- Richard Hale School (1617)
- King James's School, Knaresborough (1616)
- William Parker School (1619)
- Alleyn's School (1619) (founded as ”the College of God’s Gift”)
- Dulwich College (1619) (also founded as "the College of God's Gift")
- Merchant Taylors' School, Crosby (1620)
- Sibford Gower Endowed Primary School (1623)
- Dr Challoner's Grammar School (1624)
- The Latymer School (1624)
- Latymer Upper School (1624)
- Sir William Borlase's Grammar School (1624)
- Chigwell School (1629)
- Caistor Grammar School (1630)
- The Norton Knatchbull School (1630)
- Hitchin Boys' School (1632)
- Sir John Leman High School (1632)
- Exeter School (1633)
- Red Maids' School (1634) (all girls)
- Calday Grange Grammar School (1636)
- Lady Manners School (1636)
- Rye College, founded as Rye Grammar School (1636)
- The Blue School, Wells (1641)
- Eggar's School (1642)
- The King's School (1642), Westminster City School Formed and refounded in 1877
- Cheam School (1645)
- The Palmers School (1645), Westminster City School Formed and refounded in 1877
- Reading Blue Coat School (1646)
- The Emery Hill School (1647), Westminster City School Formed and refounded in 1877
- Thomas Adams School (1650)
- Earls High School (1652)
- Colfe's School (1652), formerly Colfe's Grammar School
- Chetham's Hospital (1653)
- Adams' Grammar School (1656)
- Blue Coat School, Walsall (1656)
- Hele's School, formerly Plympton Grammar School (1658); moved site in 1937
- The Maynard School (1658), all girls
- Henry Box School (1660)
- Bere Alston Primary School (1665)
- Sir Thomas Rich's School (1666)
- Mirfield Free Grammar School (1667)
- Old Swinford Hospital (1667)
- Read School, Drax (1667)
- Brigg Grammar School (1669), since 1976 Sir John Nelthorpe School
- Chard Grammar School (1671)
- Midhurst Rother College founded as Midhurst Grammar School (1672)
- The Harvey Grammar School, Folkestone (1674)
- Reigate Grammar School (1675)
- Lady Boswell's Church of England Primary School (1675)
- The John Roan School (1677)
- Sandbach School (1677)
- Sir James Smith's School (1679)
- Davenant Foundation School (1680)
- Parmiter's School (1681)
- All Saints Roman Catholic School, York (1686) (oldest Catholic girls' school, becoming coeducational in 1985)
- Haberdashers' Boys' School (1690), formerly Haberdashers' Aske's Boys' School, dropped 'Aske' in 2021
- Robert May's School (1694)
- The Royal Hospital School (1694)
- Grey Coat Hospital (1698)
- Perins School (1698)
- Sidcot School (1699)

=== Eighteenth century ===
- Sir Joseph Williamson's Mathematical School (1701)
- Dame Allan's School (1705)
- St Mary's CE School, Banbury (1705)
- Bluecoat Aspley Academy, Nottingham (1706)
- Warminster School (1707)
- Blue Coat Junior School, Durham (1708)
- Box Primary School, Wiltshire (1708)
- Liverpool Blue Coat School (1708)
- Lucton School (1708)
- Imberhorne School, founded as East Grinstead Grammar School (1708)
- Collegiate School, Bristol, founded as Colston's Hospital (1710)
- Coventry Blue Coat Church of England School (1714)
- Nelson Thomlinson School, founded as Wigton Grammar School (1714)
- Bluecoat School, Chester (1717)
- Baines School, Poulton Le Fylde (1717)
- Birmingham Blue Coat School (1722)
- Churcher's College (1722)
- Sir William Perkins's School (1725)
- Godolphin School, Salisbury (1726)
- Portsmouth Grammar School (1732)
- Sir Henry Fermor Church of England Primary School, Crowborough (1734)
- Kingswood School (1748)
- St Edmund's School Canterbury (1749)
- St Luke's C of E Primary School, Lowton (1751)
- Ackworth School (1779)
- The Mount School, York (1785)
- Cheney School (1797)
- Chatham and Clarendon Grammar School (1797), was Chatham House Grammar

== Wales ==
=== Sixteenth century ===
- Christ College, Brecon (1541)
- King Henry VIII School, Abergavenny (1542)
- Friars School, Bangor (1557)

=== Seventeenth century ===
- Ysgol David Hughes Ynys Môn, founded as Beaumaris Grammar School (1603)
- Hawarden High School (1606)
- Ysgol Dyffryn Conwy, founded as Llanrwst Grammar School (1610)
- Monmouth School (1614)
- Botwnnog School (1616)
- Bishop Gore School, Swansea (1682)

=== Eighteenth century ===
- Ysgol y Berwyn, founded as Bala Grammar School (1712)

== Scotland ==
=== Twelfth century ===
- High School of Glasgow (pre-1124)
- Royal High School, Edinburgh (1128)
- Stirling High School (High School of Stirling) (1129)
- Lanark Grammar School (1183)
- Kirkwall Grammar School (1200)

=== Thirteenth century ===
- Ayr Academy (1233)
- High School of Dundee (1239)
- Aberdeen Grammar School (possibly c. 1257, earliest mention 1418)

=== Fourteenth century ===
- Knox Academy (Haddington Grammar School) (1379)

=== Fifteenth century ===
- Brechin High School (1429)
- Dunfermline High School first founded in 1120 refounded (1468)
- Dumbarton Academy (earliest reference 1485)

=== Sixteenth century ===
- Montrose Academy (c. 1534, earliest evidence of schooling 1329)
- Leith Academy (1560)
- The Royal School of Dunkeld (1567)
- Paisley Grammar School (1576)
- Kirkcudbright Academy (earliest record of existence 1582)

=== Seventeenth century ===
- Musselburgh Grammar School (1626)
- George Heriot's School (1628)
- Kilmarnock Academy (as Kilmarnock Grammar School, 1630)
- Hutchesons' Grammar School (1641)
- Dunoon Grammar School (1641)
- Campbeltown Grammar School (1686)
- The Mary Erskine School (1694)
- Perth Academy (1696)

=== Eighteenth century ===
- George Watson's College, Edinburgh (1723)
- Wallace Hall (1723)
- Robert Gordon's College, Aberdeen (1750)
- Inverness Royal Academy (1792)

== Northern Ireland ==
=== Seventeenth century ===
- Royal School, Armagh (1608)
- Royal School Dungannon (1614)
- Foyle College (1617)
- Enniskillen Royal Grammar School (successor to Portora Royal School, founded 1618)

=== Eighteenth century ===
- Rainey Endowed, Magherafelt (1713)
- Friends' School, Lisburn (1774)
- Belfast Royal Academy (1785)

== Channel Islands ==
=== Sixteenth century ===
- Elizabeth College (1563)

== See also ==
- List of English and Welsh endowed schools (19th century)
- List of founders of English schools and colleges
- List of the oldest schools in the world
- Education in England
- Education in Scotland
- Education in Wales
- Education in Northern Ireland
- Armorial of schools in the United Kingdom
