= Bluecoat (disambiguation) =

Bluecoat is a style of school uniform used in some British schools.

Bluecoat or Blue Coat may also refer to:

== Education ==
- Bluecoat school, any of several individual British schools
- Charity school in UK, formerly known as Blue Coat school
- A House at The King's Hospital school, Dublin

== Companies ==
- Blue Coat Systems, a proxy-server manufacturer previously known as CacheFlow
- Bluecoat Press, a Liverpool-based publisher

== Buildings ==
- Blue School, Dublin which housed the Irish Houses of Parliament before 1729
- Law Society of Ireland offices, in the former Blue Coat School buildings
- Bluecoat Chambers, oldest building in central Liverpool and home of the Bluecoat arts centre

== Other uses ==
- Operation Bluecoat, a British offensive during World War II in 1944
- Bluecoats Drum and Bugle Corps, based in Canton, Ohio
- Bluecoats, members of the entertainment staff at Pontin's holiday camps in the United Kingdom
- American soldiers, marines or sailors who traditionally wore blue uniforms
- Les Tuniques Bleues, a comic about American Civil War soldiers
