= R. M. Fraser =

British painter

Robert Macdonald Fraser (11 July 1870 – 18 February 1947), known as R. M. Fraser, of Scottish descent, was a landscape and coastal painter.

== Life ==
He was born in Liverpool. During the period between 1910 and 1938, he showed some fifty paintings at Liverpool’s Walker Art Gallery, and had work accepted at seven Royal Academy summer exhibitions. Other venues included the Royal Cambrian Academy of Art, the Manchester Art Gallery and The Bluecoat in Liverpool. He became Vice President of the Liverpool ‘Artists Club’ in 1929.

== Artistry ==
His subjects were predominantly the landscapes of North Wales and the North West of England. During the 1930s the family-owned holiday cottages in North Wales, firstly at Rowen in the Conway Valley and then at Beddgelert where the surrounding hills and coastline of Snowdonia provided inspiration for his work. At the opening its 1937 exhibition at Liverpool’s Bluecoat Gallery, R. M. Fraser’s Menai Straits was acclaimed as being ‘a lovely episode of the sea and coast as seen from Anglesey’. As well as the seascapes and hills of Wales and the moorlands of Lancashire, he was also drawn to the flat landscapes and wide skies of south Lancashire close to his home in Crosby (a north Liverpool suburb). His working method was to paint initially ‘En plein air’, with oil sketches providing the basis for larger studio paintings.

This catalogue brings together images of his paintings inherited by family members, but it does not represent a complete collection as it would appear that many were sold. A number of the photographs taken by the artist of his own paintings prior to sale still exist together with handwritten notes indicating the price and title. Little is known of his formative years but it is possible that his interest in painting developed during his secondary school years at the Liverpool Institute and Art School, this being the first educational establishment to specialise in the visual arts outside London. RM Fraser’s early career was in commerce but certainly by the age of thirty he had become involved Liverpool art circles. He left his job as a company secretary during his forties and then concentrated on his artistic career. Married to Eve Brown, herself an accomplished artist, they had four children, James, Marion, Beatrice and Robert, three of whom became practicing artists. Marion was to graduate from the Royal College of Art in London, Robert attended the Liverpool Art College, and James in later life set up a Studio in Dent, West Yorkshire.

Fraser died in Crosby England, in 1947.
