= Bluecoat =

Style of dress code traditionally worn in bluecoat schools

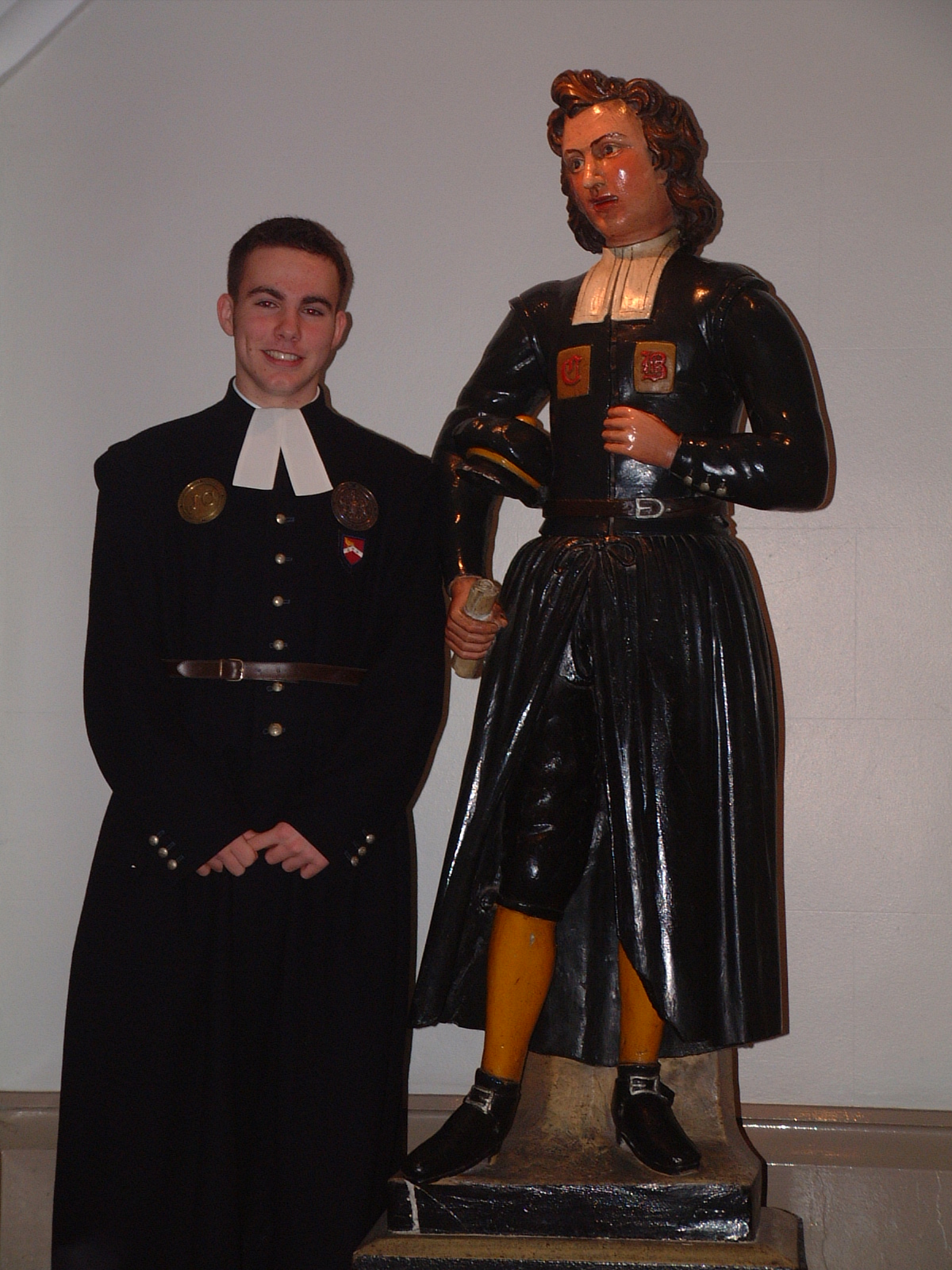
Queen Elizabeth's Hospital Captain of School 2002/3, dressed in traditional bluecoat uniform, standing by the statue of a pupil in bluecoat uniform.

The bluecoat is a style of dress code, traditionally worn in bluecoat schools (English private schools deriving from charity schools).

The main element of the bluecoat is a long (dark blue or black) coat, belted at the waist, with white neck decoration. Underneath a white shirt and grey breeches are worn, with knee-length stockings and smart shoes.

== History ==
The uniform has its origin in the 16th-century dress of foundlings housed at Christ's Hospital, then in the City of London. Bluecoat schools based on the model of Christ's Hospital were set up in emulation in other urban centres. The last bluecoat school to be founded was that in Wigan in 1773.

The essayist Leigh Hunt (educated at Christ's Hospital from 1791 to 1799) described the bluecoat uniform: "Our dress was of the coarsest and quaintest kind, but was respected out of doors, and is so. It consisted of a blue drugget gown, or body, with ample coats to it; a yellow vest underneath in winter-time; small-clothes of Russia duck; worsted yellow stockings; a leathern girdle; and a little black worsted cap, usually carried in the hand. I believe it was the ordinary dress of children in humble life, during the reign of the Tudors. We used to flatter ourselves that it was taken from the monks..."

Most bluecoat schools have abandoned the uniform and replaced it with more modern styles. There are a few schools however that still retain the uniform, but use it for special occasions only. Only one school in England, Christ's Hospital, still uses bluecoat uniform as normal day wear.

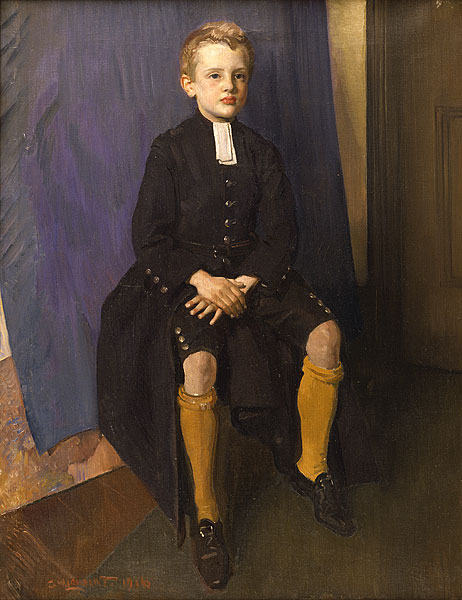
The bluecoat uniform as worn at Christ's Hospital in Horsham, West Sussex

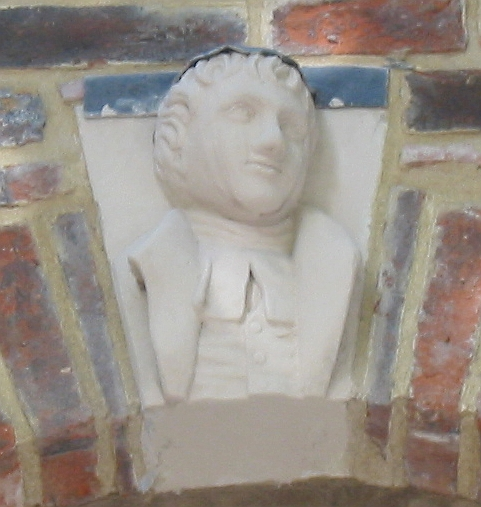
The Liverpool Blue Coat School used to have a bluecoat uniform, as shown by this sculpted detail on the former building at Bluecoat Chambers

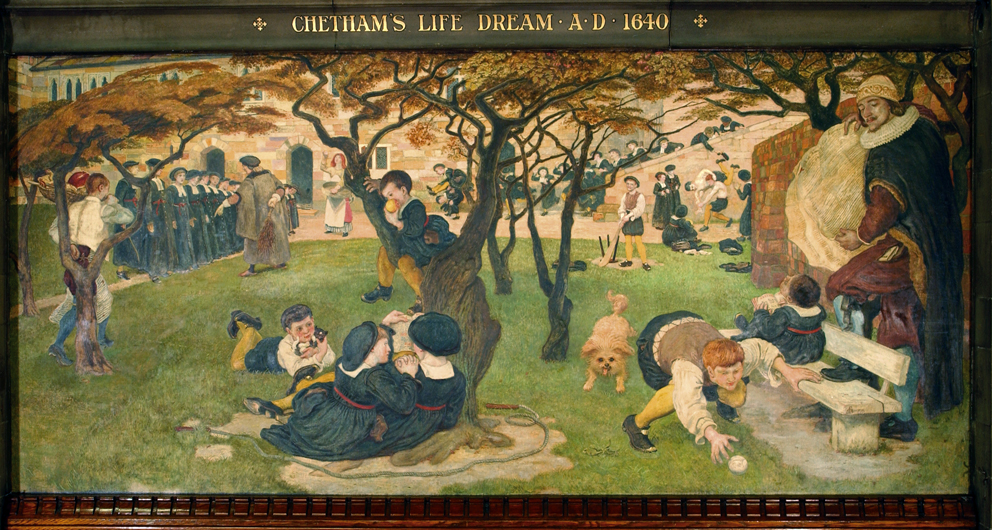
Chetham's School of Music in Manchester was formerly a bluecoat school

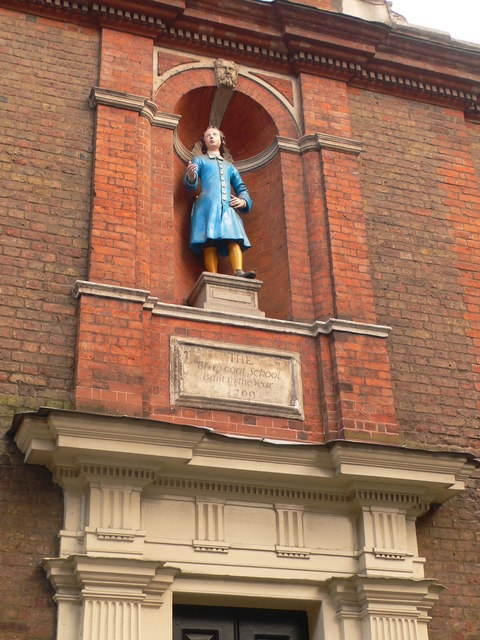
Former Blewcoat School, London; now a shop

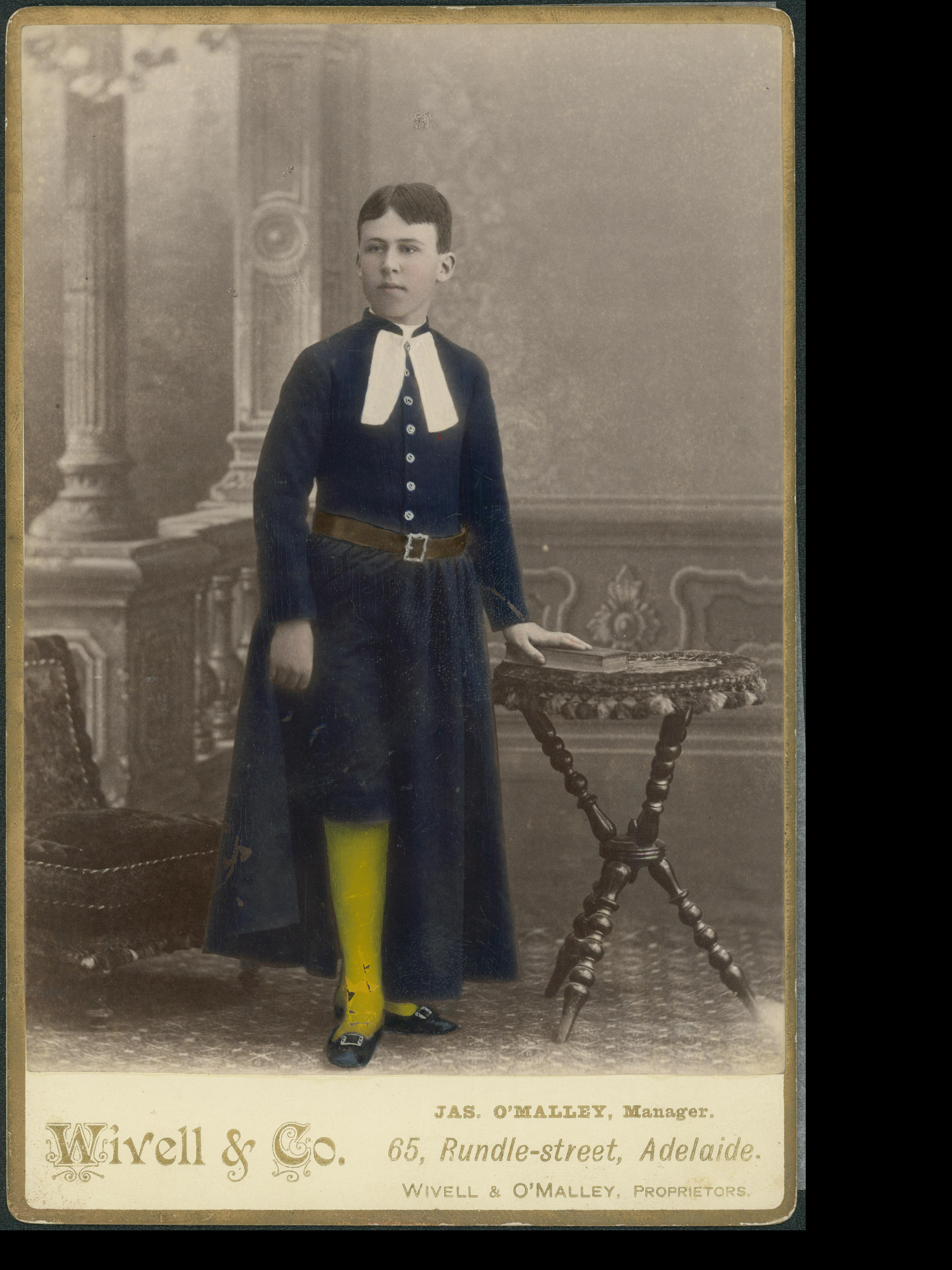
A photograph of bluecoat costume in 1887
