= Blewcoat School =

Former charitable school in London, England

The Blewcoat
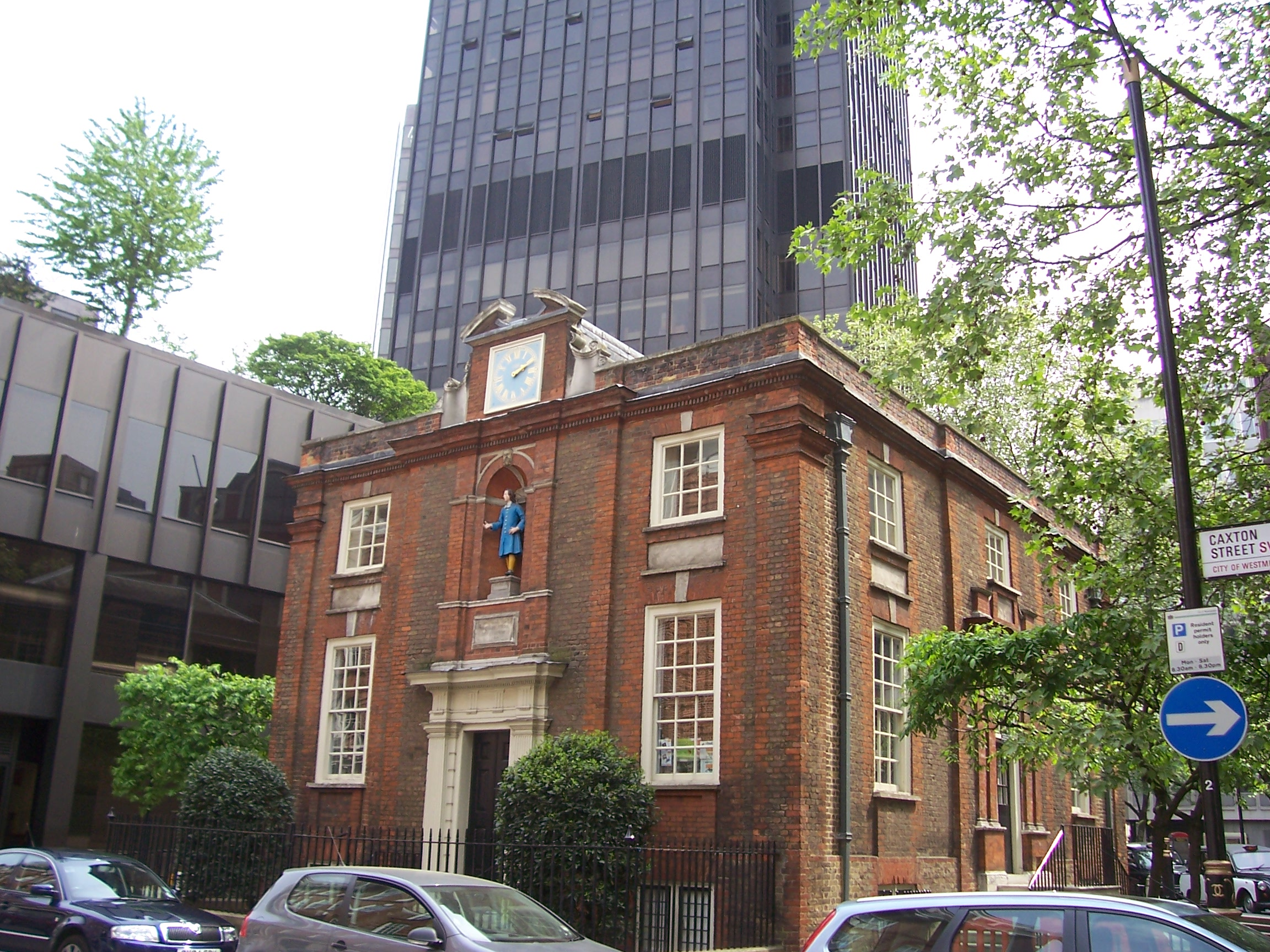
- Blewcoat School, May 2008
- Interactive map of the The Blewcoat area

General information
- Type: School
- Location: City of Westminster; London, SW1, United Kingdom
- Coordinates: 51°29′54.3″N 0°8′9.9″W
- Current tenants: Ian Stuart
- Construction started: 1709

Blewcoat School is a building in Caxton Street, London, that was built in 1709 as a school for the poor (a Bluecoat school). It was used as a school until 1926. In 1954, it was purchased by the National Trust who used it as a gift shop and information centre. In 2013 the building was refurbished as The Blewcoat, a store for fashion designer Ian Stuart.

== School ==
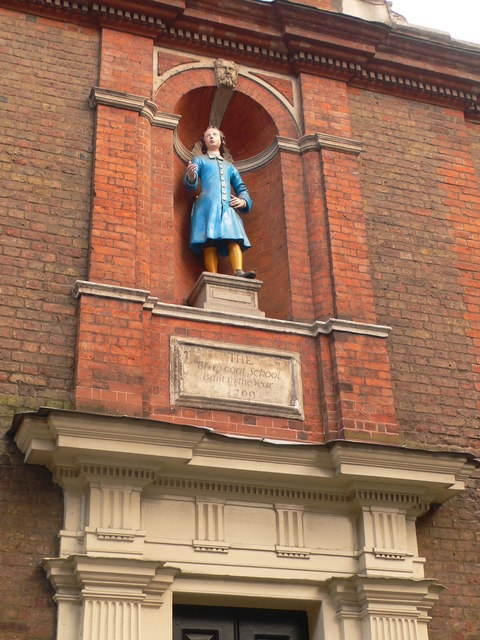
Statue above door

The school was founded in Duck Lane in about 1688 by voluntary subscription as a charity school for the education of poor boys to teach them reading, writing, religion, and trades. It moved to purpose-built premises in Caxton Street. From 1714 to about 1876, it also admitted girls. In 1899, it was agreed that the school should move to a site that had been owned by the Christ Church National Schools Trust, and the Caxton Street site was then used for an elementary school. The school closed in 1926.

== Later uses ==
During World War II, the building was used by the American services as a store. Afterwards, the Girl Guides used it as a youth club. When the National Trust bought it in 1954, it was used as their membership and head office. Later, it was converted into a gift shop. June 2014 saw the opening of British designer Ian Stuart's boutique in the building, selling bridal gowns, special occasion wear and evening gown collections.
