= Sonia Harris =

British High Court judge (born 1974)

The Honourable Ms Justice Harris DBE KC
- Royal coat of arms of the United Kingdom

Justice of the High Court
- Incumbent
- Assumed office 30 September 2024
- Appointed by: Charles III

Personal details
- Born: Sonia Ruth Harris; 12 September 1974 (age 52) Coventry, UK
- Education: University of Oxford; University of British Columbia

Dame Sonia Ruth Harris (born 12 September 1974) is a British High Court judge.

== Education ==
Harris attended Coventry Blue Coat Church of England School. In 1993, she received a BA degree in jurisprudence from Christ Church, Oxford, graduating with first-class honours.

In 2009, she earned an LLM degree at the Peter A. Allard School of Law of the University of British Columbia. Harris had visiting appointments at University of Victoria, Canada, and University of New South Wales, Australia, supported by a British Academy research grant.

== Career ==
=== Academic ===
Harris was called to the bar (Lincoln's Inn) in 1998. From 1999 to 2006, she was a senior lecturer at Durham University. From 2006 to 2014, she was reader and then professor of family law and policy at Birmingham School of Law. Between 2012 and 2014, she was head of the University of Birmingham's Centre for Employability, Professional Legal Education and Research (CEPLER). While at Birmingham, she was an honorary door tenant at St Philips Chambers. In 2008, she became director of the Birmingham Law School LLM programme. Between January and April 2010, she was a visiting scholar at Stockholm University. In 2012, she was appointed special adviser to the House of Lords' Select Committee on Adoption. She is an honorary professor at the University of Birmingham.

=== Judge ===
In 2010, Harris was appointed a deputy district judge. In 2014, she was appointed a district judge. In 2018, she was appointed as circuit judge and was authorised to sit as a High Court judge in the Family Division. In 2019, she was appointed the designated family judge for Stoke-on-Trent and Staffordshire. In 2024, she was appointed senior circuit judge and designated family judge at Wolverhampton Combined Court Centre. Harris was on the advisory group of the Children's Rights Judgement. She is a member of the United Kingdom Association of Women Judges and the International Association of Women Judges.

On 30 September 2024, Harris was appointed a judge of the Family Division of the High Court following several retirements. She received the customary damehood in 2025.

== Publications ==
=== Author ===
- Family Law: Text, Cases and Materials with Joanna Miles (2011) Pub. OUP ISBN 9780199563821
- Aboriginal Child Welfare, Self-Government and the Rights of the Indigenous Children: Protecting the Vulnerable Under International Law (2012) Pub. Routledge ISBN 9781409419549

=== Contributor ===
- Accommodating Cultural Diversity ed. Stephen Tierney (2007) Pub. Routledge ISBN 9781317185918
- Judicial Reasoning under the UK Human Rights Act Ed. Helen Fenwick, Gavin Phillipson, Roger Masterman (2009) Pub. CUP ISBN 9781139466769
- The Legal, Medical and Cultural Regulation of the Body Ed. Stephen W Smith, Ronan Deazley (2009) Pub. Routledge ISBN 9781138260320
- Feminist Judgements: From Theory to Practice ed. Clare McGlynn, Erika Rackley, Rosemary Hunter (2010) Pub. Bloomsbury ISBN 9781847317278
- Fifty years of Family Law: Essays for Stephen Cretney Ed. Rebecca Probert, Chris Baron (2012) Pub. Cambridge ISBN 9781780680521
- The UN Convention on the Rights of the Child: A Commentary Ed. John Tobin (2019) Pub. OUP ISBN 9780191544170

=== Editor ===
- The Futures of Legal Education and the Legal Profession with Hilary Sommerlad (2015) Pub. Hart Publishing ISBN 9781849466554

=== Articles ===
Harris has contributed articles to:

- British Yearbook of International Law
- Child and Family Law Quarterly
- Human Rights Quarterly
- The International and Comparative Law Quarterly
- International Journal of Law, Policy and the Family
- Journal of Law and Society
