= Bourne Grammar School =

Location
- South Road; Bourne, Lincolnshire, PE10 9JE; England; 52°45′45″N 0°22′24″W

Information
- Type: State school Grammar School
- Motto: Vigila et Ora (Watch and pray)
- Religious affiliation: Non-religious
- Established: 1330
- Founder: Lincoln Cathedral
- Department for Education URN: 137793 Tables
- Ofsted: Reports
- Chairman of Governors: I Mears
- Headmaster: Mark Brunker
- Staff: 130
- Gender: Coeducational
- Age: 11 to 18
- Enrolment: 1600+ (Over 400 in Sixth Form)
- Houses: Behn, Meitner, Tinbergen, Rorschach
- Colours: Red and Gold
- Publication: BGS Bulletin
- Former pupils: Old Brunnians
- School Song: Christian, seek not yet repose
- Re-Endowed: 1636
- Website: Official website

Bourne Grammar School (BGS) is a co-educational grammar school on South Road (A15), in Bourne, Lincolnshire, England. The school was founded in 1330. It previously held Arts College Status, and was awarded Academy status in January 2012, although it retains its former name.

== History ==
The original foundation dates from no later than 1330, when a new headmaster was admitted to the school by the Lincoln Cathedral chapter. It was re-endowed in 1636 by a bequest of William Trollope, who had built the old school building in 1626. That building still exists in the Abbey Churchyard, although it was re-roofed and partially rebuilt in 1736, and is now Grade II listed.

It continued to be used until 1904, but it was feared the coming railways would have made better-equipped schools more accessible causing the school to fade away. Efforts were made to reinstate it once the First World War was over, and in 1920, it opened in the building of the former National School, in North Street, moving to its present site in July 1921.

In 1921, once its longer-term premises (where the school continues to be based) in South Road were usable, it moved there. At this stage, it was run by trustees under the name of the 'Harrington and Trollope Secondary School', after Robert Harrington and William Trollope, two local seventeenth-century philanthropists whose bequests had been made for the poor and the school of Bourne respectively. Kesteven County Council topped up the funds required with an annual grant and by paying for free places at the school for pupils who qualified for assistance.

In 1947, following the end of the Second World War and the Education Act 1944, management was taken over by the Kesteven County Council and the current name was adopted. Since 1974, the county council concerned has been Lincolnshire, previously being controlled by the Kesteven Education Committee at Sleaford. In the 1970s, the school roll was around 400.

In 2018 a new £3.5 million building opened for the Science department. The block included fifteen laboratories, a staff room, toilet facilities, and a climate-control system. It created 600 new spaces at the school.

== Houses ==
There is a house system and Form Groups within the school designated by the letters A to H from years 7-11, and A to J in the sixth form. All students are assigned 1 of 4 houses: Behn (Aphra Behn), Meitner (Lise Meitner), Rorschach (Hermann Rorschach) and Tinbergen (Nikolaas Tinbergen). Each house's name was chosen by its original leader in 2012 (the four members of staff coming from the Drama, Physics, Psychology and Biology departments of the school respectively). This replaced the system of five houses ('V', 'W', 'X', 'Y', 'Z') to match the five form groups in each year (everyone in each form being from one house) that existed before the school's expansion in 2012.

== Badge ==
The school badge is a red shield with two gold bars and three gold discs above (Gules, two bars Or, in chief three bezants). Some of the heraldry is common with that of the Bourne Town Council (formerly Bourne UDC) ie an escutcheon Or on a Fess Azure between in chief three Torteaux and in base a Wake Knot. Both the arms of the school and the council are derived from the arms of the Wake family, medieval lords of the Manor of Bourne. The school shares the town motto Vigila et Ora, meaning "Watch and Pray". The reference is Christ's injunction to His disciples in St Matthew's Gospel: "Watch and pray so that you will not fall into temptation. The spirit is willing, but the flesh is weak."

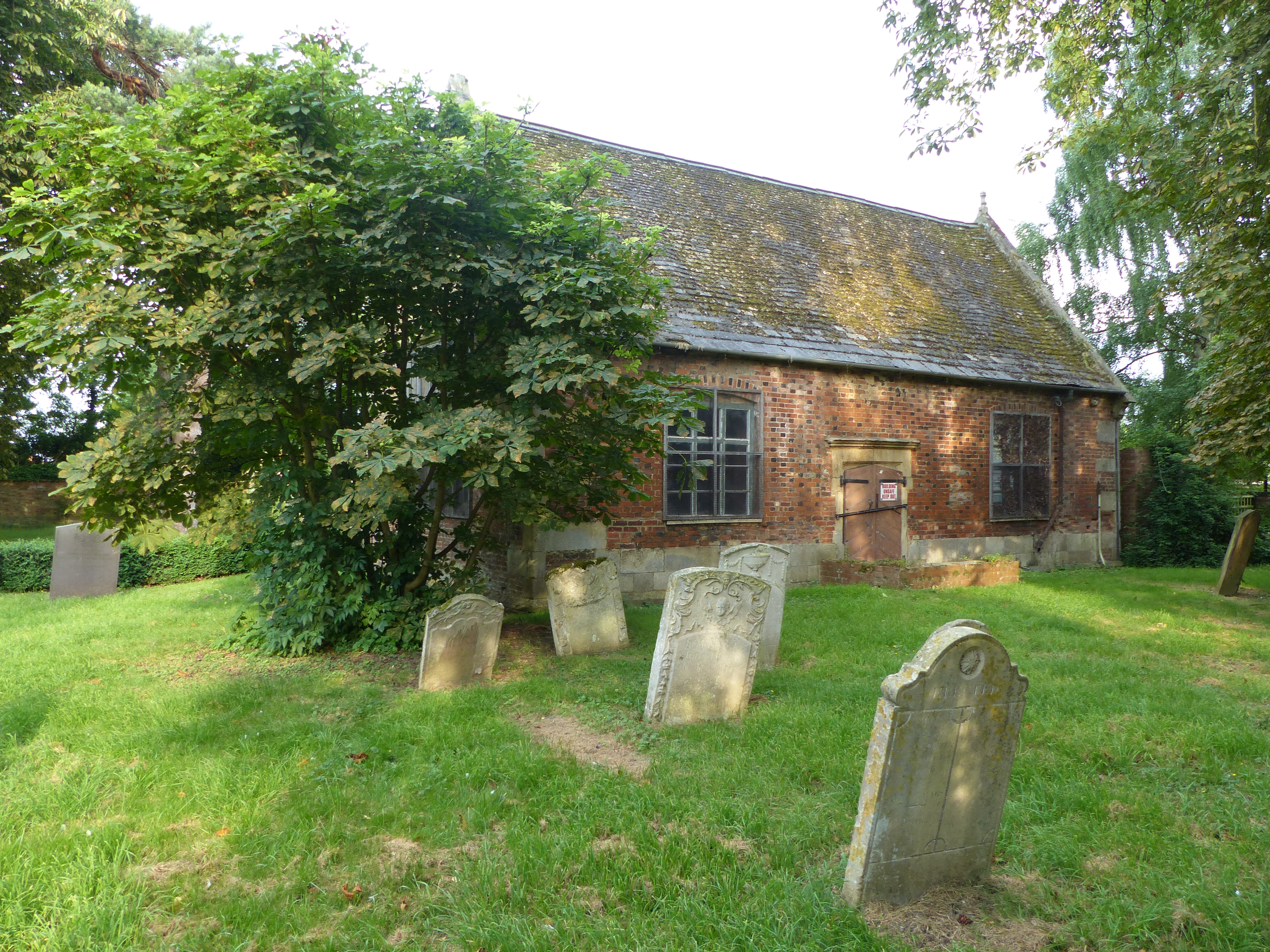
Old grammar school in Bourne Abbey churchyard

== Recognition ==
The school states it achieves "Advanced level" results in the top three for schools in the East Midlands. Its headmaster reported in his weekly bulletin that their 2017 GCSE results placed them second in Lincolnshire. The school's Progress 8 benchmark for the 2022/23 academic year was +0.60, indicating a high improvement of student ability across their time at the school.

== Notable alumni ==
- Charlie Hopkins, first-class cricketer
- Neil Mallender, England cricketer
- Pat Brown, England cricketer
- Mark Sedwill, Baron Sedwill, National Security Advisor (UK) April 2017-September 2020, Cabinet Secretary and Head of the Civil Service
- Claire Steels, racing cyclist
- Blake Fielder-Civil, previous partner of the late Amy Winehouse, dropped out at 17.
- Iain Mansfield, former civil servant, winner of a £100,000 award in 2014 for an essay detailing a "blueprint for Brexit".

== See also ==
- Bourne Abbey
- Bourne Academy
- List of the oldest schools in the United Kingdom
