= Charlie Hopkins =

English cricketer

Personal information
- Full name: Charles Edward Heughan Hopkins
- Born: 12 June 1987 (age 39); Peterborough, Cambridgeshire, England
- Batting: Right-handed
- Bowling: Right-arm medium

Domestic team information
- Years: Team
- 2007–2010: Lincolnshire
- 2010: Cambridge MCCU
- 2010: Cambridge University

Career statistics
Competition	First-class
Matches	3
Runs scored	34
Batting average	8.50
100s/50s	–/–
Top score	14
Balls bowled	366
Wickets	2
Bowling average	152.50
5 wickets in innings	–
10 wickets in match	–
Best bowling	1/66
Catches/stumpings	–/–
- Source: Cricinfo, 15 February 2019

Charles Edwin Heughan Hopkins (born 12 June 1987) is an English former first-class cricketer.

Hopkins was born at Peterborough and was educated at Bourne Grammar School, before going up to the University of Nottingham to study bioscience. He then undertook postgraduate studies at Jesus College, Cambridge. While at Cambridge he made his debut in first-class cricket for Cambridge MCCU against Surrey at Fenner's in 2010. (Note: Cambridge MCCU differs from Cambridge University Cricket Club in that it is open to students at Anglia Ruskin University, whereas Cambridge University Cricket Club is exclusively for students of the constituent colleges of the University of Cambridge.) He played a further first-class match in 2010 for Cambridge MCCU against Leicestershire, before making a first-class appearance in 2010 for Cambridge University against Oxford University at Oxford. He played three first-class matches while at Cambridge, scoring 34 runs and taking 2 wickets with his right-arm medium pace bowling. He gained a blue in cricket.

Hopkins played minor counties cricket for Lincolnshire, debuting against Norfolk in the 2007 Minor Counties Championship. He played minor counties cricket for Lincolnshire from 2007–2010, making five appearances in the Minor Counties Championship and two appearances in the minor counties one-day tournament.
