= Coventry Blue Coat Church of England School =

Blue Coat Church of England School
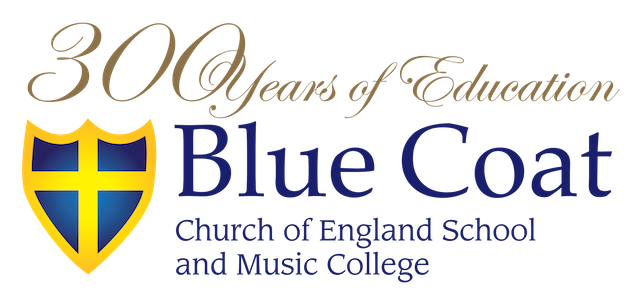

Location
- Terry Road; Coventry, West Midlands, CV1 2BA; England; 52.4003°N 1.4925°W

Information
- Type: Academy
- Motto: Christian education with care
- Religious affiliation: Church of England
- Established: 1714; 312 years ago
- Local authority: Coventry City Council
- Trust: Inspire Education Trust
- Department for Education URN: 137272 Tables
- Ofsted: Reports
- Head teacher: Lisa Henden
- Gender: Coeducational
- Age: 11 to 18
- Enrolment: 1,495 as of April 2021
- Capacity: 1,634
- International peace link: Cross of nails school
- Website: http://www.bluecoatschool.com/

The Blue Coat Church of England School is a specialist secondary school and sixth form located in Coventry, England. It is an International Cross Of Nails (ICON) school, with links to schools all over the world. The school is funded by the state, with academy status. It is a specialist Music, Maths and Science academy.

== History ==
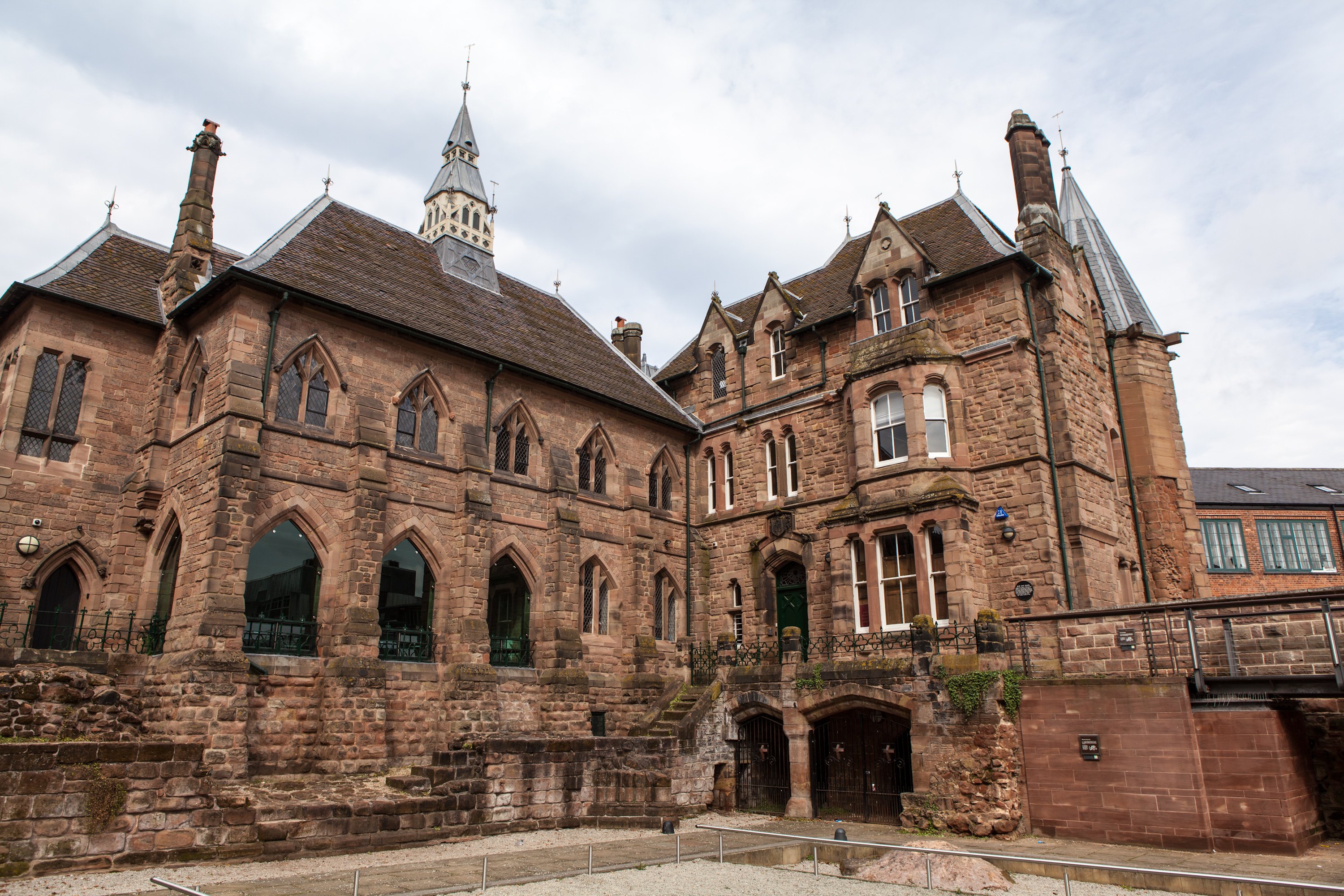
Part of the old site of Blue Coat School

Blue coat schools were mainly founded in the 16th century across England as charity schools, where they were known as "bluecoat schools" because of their distinctive blue uniform. Blue was traditionally the colour of charity and was a common colour for clothing. The uniform included a blue frock coat and yellow stockings with white bands.

The Original Blue Coat school was founded as a school for girls in 1714, close to Holy Trinity Church in the city centre of Coventry, and the ruins of St Mary's Priory and Cathedral. It was re-built on the same location in 1856. The original building as it stands today was designed by James Murray in a Gothic style to resemble a French château, and is currently used by Holy Trinity Church.

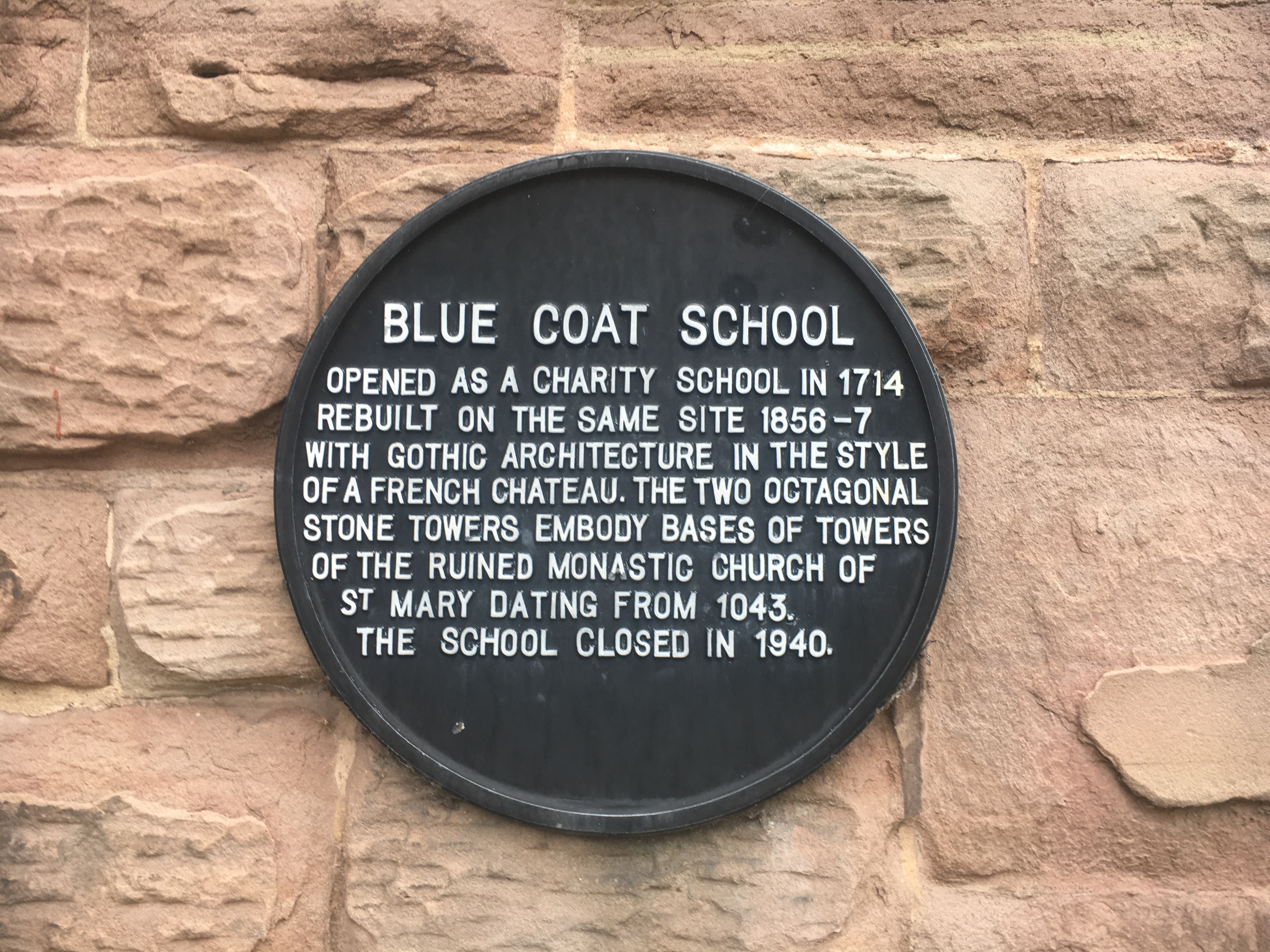
Plaque on the site of the original school

The school occupied the site until 1964, when it moved to its current site at Terry Road, Coventry. In 2011 the school secured a 125-year lease to the historic Charterhouse Fields in a bitterly contested six-year process. In the same year, the school was granted academy status. It also opened a football academy for talented female footballers in conjunction with Coventry City Ladies Football.

The school marked its tercentenary in 2015. Justin Welby, the Archbishop of Canterbury, visited the school in 2016.

== Heads ==
- 1964–1980 – William J Grimes
- 1980–1986 – Rev R. Lewie
- 1986–1999 – D. Lewin
- 1999–2008 – Stephen Timbrell
- 2009–2015 – Dr Julie Roberts
- 2015–2016 – Francis Peacock (interim head)
- 2016–2024 – Victoria Shelley
- 2024– Lisa Wright

== Ethos ==
At the start of the school year, each form elects several representatives to serve on the year council. Two or three of these year council representatives are elected to serve on the school council. The year councils discuss issues regarding school life and pass their findings to the school council, who consider them. The school council has a budget to facilitate resolution of these issues as long as they support the Christian ethos of the school.

=== International Cross of Nails School ===
In the latter part of the Second World War, Coventry Cathedral was heavily bombed during the Coventry Blitz. Three large medieval nails recovered from the ruins of the cathedral were subsequently shaped into a cross. This cross was replicated and became a symbol of peace. Many were presented worldwide to schools and organisations.

== Awards ==
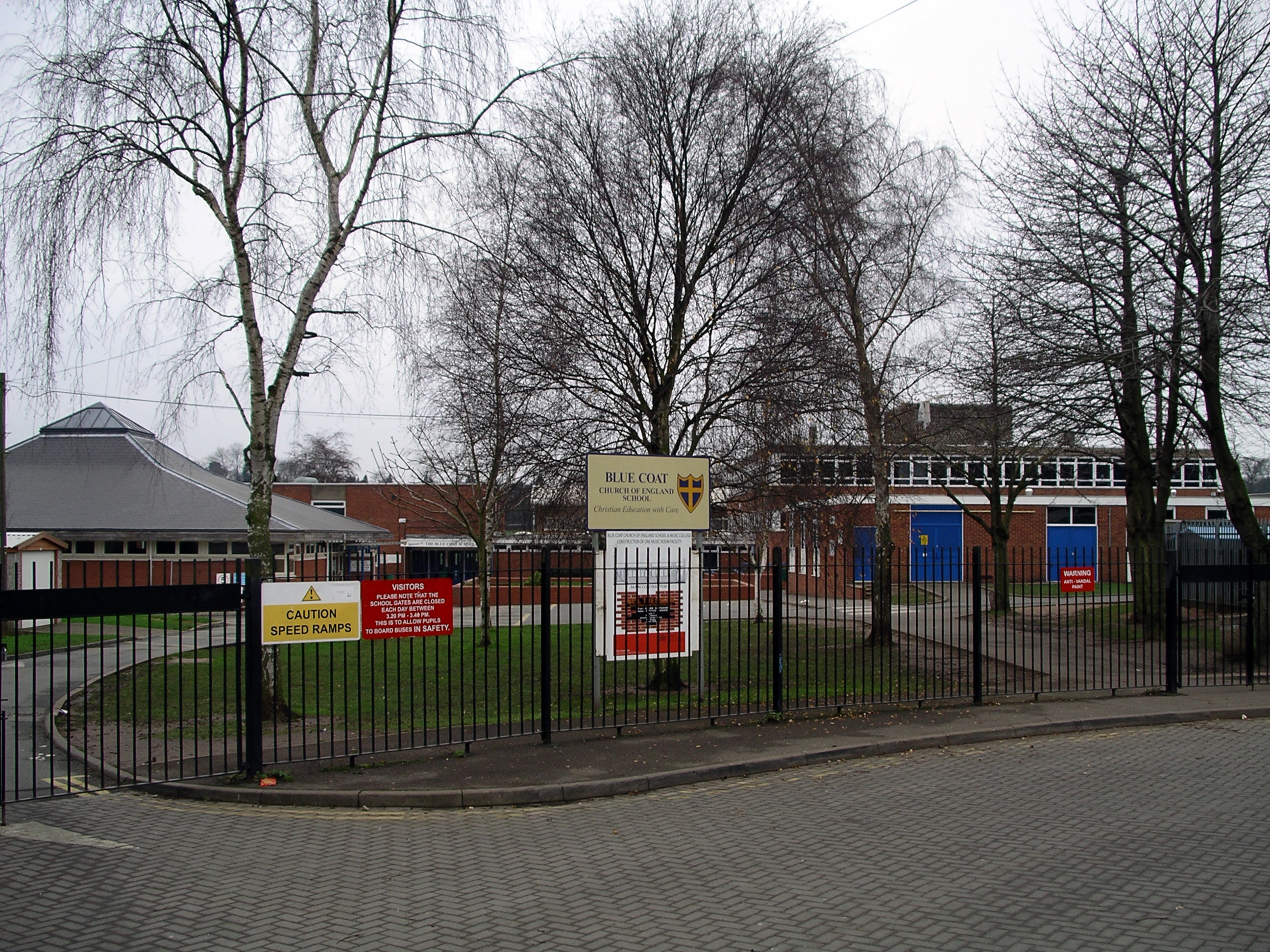
Current Terry Road site

- 2009 – Impact and Innovation Award to recognise the staff's efforts in working with other schools
- 2015 – Educational Outcomes Award from education charity SSAT for coming in the top 10% of England's non-selective schools.
- 2021 – Lord Mayor's Peace and Reconciliation Award.

== Choir ==
The school has an award-winning eight-part (SSAATTBB) choir which in its current format was established in the 1976. It can trace its roots back to the 18th century. It performs choral works ranging from Thomas Tallis through Joseph Haydn to John Tavener. The choir has performed for the Archbishop of Canterbury and the Bishop of Coventry. The choir marked its 60th anniversary at Holy Trinity Church, Coventry in July 2024.

=== Performing venues ===
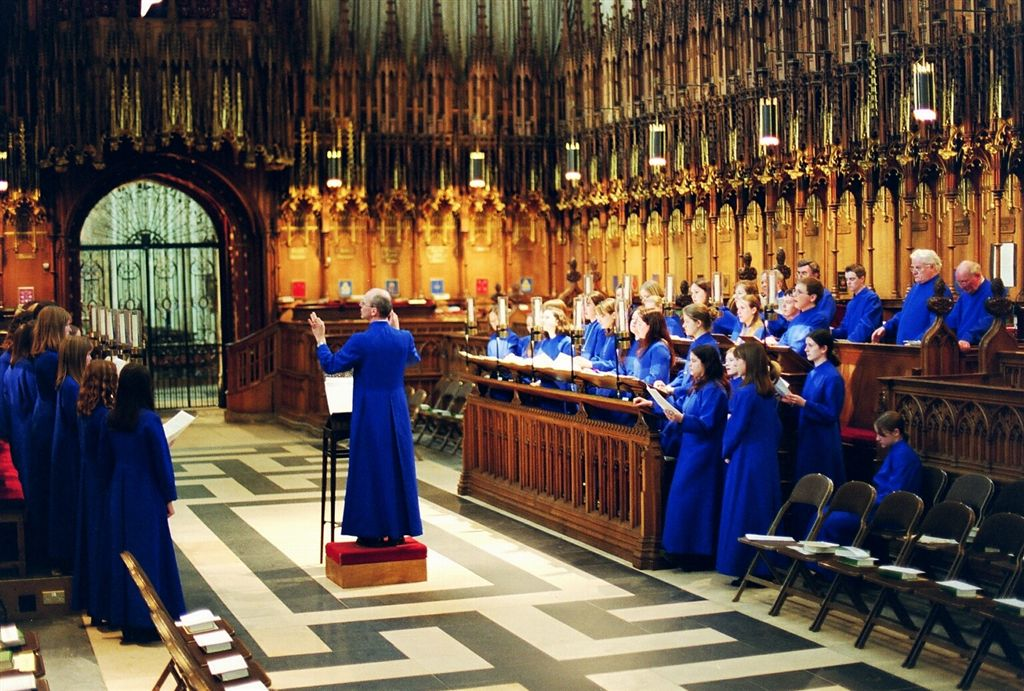
Blue Coat School Choir singing at York Minster

The choir has sung at Holy Trinity Church, Coventry many times. It visits cathedrals each year to sing services for the week while the resident choir is away. Venues have included:

- Coventry Cathedral
- Wells Cathedral
- Chester Cathedral
- York Minster
- Blackburn Cathedral
- Salisbury Cathedral
- Worcester Cathedral
- Liverpool Cathedral
- St Paul's Cathedral
- Westminster Abbey

Other locations include:

- Ricoh Arena – singing Coventry City Football Club's anthem
- Oban and the Western Isles
- Strasbourg and the Black Forest
- Symphony Hall, Birmingham
- St Mark's Basilica, Venice
- Stoneleigh Park where the choir performed in front of 2000 people in 2014
- 2012: As part of the Coventry Cathedral Golden Jubilee celebrations, a group of senior members performed in front of a congregation of 2000, which included the Princess Royal and the Archbishop of Canterbury.

=== Awards and competitions ===
- 1998 – won Royal Society of St George Award for services to youth
- 2008 – the choir won the BBC Songs of Praise School Choir of the Year competition with their performance of Bright Morning Stars Are Rising and How Great Thou Art

=== Television and film ===
- 1980s – Kilroy Silk (the same episode featured Shakin' Stevens and Flavor Flav)
- BBC Songs of Praise
- 2011 – The boys section were selected to appear in the film Nativity 2: Danger in the Manger. Part of the storyline involved David Tennant as conductor.

=== Radio ===
The choir has appeared on:

- BBC Radio 2 Sunday Half Hour
- BBC Radio 4 including The Daily Service
- BBC World Service
- BBC CWR

=== Recordings ===
- Blue Coat Church of England School Choir in Coventry Cathedral
- Angel Voices Ever Singing
- Songs of Praise – The School Choir of the Year (2011) pub. EMI

=== Alumni ===
- Matthew Sandy (tenor)
- Helen Daniels (mezzo)
- Imogen Russell (soprano)

== Dramatic productions ==
The school has at least three annual dramatic productions. There is an annual musical open to all students, with productions including We Will Rock You, The Wiz, Les Miserables, The Sound of Music, Oliver and Hairspray. There is a production for students in key stages 4 and 5 such as Sleeping Beauty, Lord of the Flies, The Lady Killers and The Good Person of Schezuan. Also, an annual production for students in key stage 3, including The Comedy of Errors, Ignite and The Canterbury Tales. There are also bespoke community drama projects in partnership with a range of organisations and student directed productions.

In 2017 a production of One Good Soul, with script by an English teacher and score by a sixth form student, made a debut at the Edinburgh Festival Fringe.

== Uniform ==
The current Blue Coat School uniform for Years 7–11 consists of: School blazer, white shirt, black trousers or regulation skirt, House tie, black, grey or white socks, black shoes. The school changed to clip-on ties in 2013, citing neatness and safety.

== House system ==
Under Victoria Shelley, the school implemented a new house system. The houses are named Cavell, Dorsey, Lewis, Parks and Wilberforce. These were chosen to reflect the schools six values: Care, Hard work, Respect, Integrity, Servanthood and Togetherness, an acronym for CHRIST. Tutorials are based on house systems, and contain students from a variety of years to promote inter-year coherence. It also affects the tie a student wear – each house is designated a colour, and each tie has different coloured stripes.

Much like other schools with house systems, there are heads of each house, and prefects (student support members) under each head.

Previously when joining the school (from primary schools) all students were placed in the lower school which was identified by the colour green. In the following year students were placed into one of three traditional houses named after Bishops of Coventry: Neville Gorton, Mervyn Haigh, and Cuthbert Bardsley. The houses were identified by the colours red, yellow, and blue respectively. The houses were localised individually into the three main buildings of the school, but tuition took place across the site (based on academic streaming). Tutor groups were based on the house system and only contained students in the same year group. However, they contained students from each of the different academic streams. The house system was not used in the sixth form which was divided into a "lower sixth" and "upper sixth".

The academic streaming was initially based on a student's 11+ performance. However, students could move streams based on the school's end of year examinations in the lower school. The streams consisted of classes A and B (equal top stream), C and D (equal second stream), E and F.

== Financial crisis 2015 ==
It was announced in a letter home to parents on 5 March 2015 that the whole governing body of the school was to stepping down to make way for an interim governing body as the school was facing "serious financial issues". A number of support posts were at risk.

On BBC CWR's radio Breakfast show on 5 March 2015 there were calls from parents for Julie Roberts to stand down. The BBC reported that there was a £1.4 million shortfall in funding. Roberts was put on special leave and in May 2015, she resigned. F. Peacock became interim headteacher and in 2016 Victoria Shelley became the new headteacher, and Peacock reverted to his role in the History department.

As of the end of 2018, the school remained £668,000 in debt to the Education and Skills Funding Agency.

== Notable alumni ==
- Jeremy Filsell - pianist, organist and composer
- Stewart Harcourt - screenwriter and playwright
- The Hon. Mrs Justice Harris - High Court judge and legal academic
- Jen Ledger - drummer and co-vocalist for Christian rock band Skillet
- Ben Amanna - CEO of BOXRAW
