= Bryan Blundell =

English merchant who served as Mayor of Liverpool

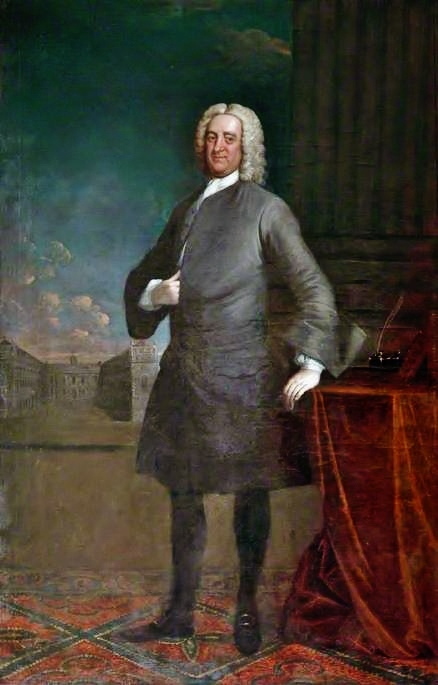
- Born: c. 1675; Liverpool, United Kingdom
- Died: 27 January 1756; Liverpool, United Kingdom
- Occupations: Mayor of Liverpool, Founder and treasurer of the Liverpool Blue Coat School, Slave trader
- Children: Richard Blundell, Jonathan Blundell, Henry Blundell

Bryan Blundell (c. 1675 – 1756) was an English slave trader who served as Mayor of Liverpool. Blundell founded the Liverpool Blue Coat School in 1708 in conjunction with the Rector of Liverpool, the Reverend Robert Styth, to provide an education for the city's destitute children and orphans.

Blundell was also involved in the trade and transportation of African slaves. He was the owner of the Tarleton, which landed 236 slaves in Barbados having embarked them on the Gold Coast. Blundell's sons were heavily involved in the transatlantic slave trade before and after his death and throughout the 18th century.

== Life and career ==
=== Maritime career ===
Blundell first went to sea aged eleven and kept a detailed journal chronicling contemporary political events and their impact on transatlantic trade. This document also contains his amateur colour drawings of ships and detailed drafts of their rigging plans, which enabled him to have vessels constructed in Virginia at a far lower cost than in England.

After his early exposure to the sea, Blundell made a career as a merchant. Blundell owned The Mulberry, which was the first ship in the Old Dock in Liverpool in 1715 and transported a large number of indentured English workers to Virginia.

=== Philanthropy ===
In 1708, Blundell founded a Bluecoat school in Liverpool in conjunction with the Reverend Robert Styth. Both Blundell and Styth were members of the Society for Promoting Christian Knowledge. Fifty boys were admitted to the school in its first year and a school building (Bluecoat Chambers) was dedicated in 1717 to provide boarding facilities for the growing number of students, towards which Blundell gave £500.

After Robert Styth's death in 1714, Blundell was appointed treasurer of the school, an appointment he held for forty two years until his own death in 1756. Upon gaining this position Blundell finally resigned himself from the sea, though he continued to operate as a merchant and slave trader. Blundell expressed a desire in his accounts to "see as many charity schools as there are churches" as well as to see one hundred boys and girls in the Bluecoat before his death - a goal which was indeed accomplished.

Blundell died on 27 January 1756 and was interred at the Church of Our Lady and Saint Nicholas. His memorial stone now resides in the chapel of the Liverpool Blue Coat School after the church was damaged during the Liverpool Blitz. His sons succeeded him as treasurers of the Bluecoat.
