= Blue Coat Church of England Academy =

Coordinates: 52.5812°N 1.9758°W

Location
- Birmingham Street; Walsall; West Midlands, WS1 2ND; England

Information
- Type: Academy
- Religious affiliation: Church of England
- Local authority: Walsall
- Department for Education URN: 138606 Tables
- Ofsted: Reports
- Gender: Mixed
- Age: 11 to 18
- Enrolment: 686 as of April 2016
- Website: http://www.bluecoatacademy.org/

Blue Coat Church of England Academy (formerly Blue Coat Church of England Comprehensive School) is a mixed Church of England secondary school and sixth form located in Walsall in the West Midlands of England.

== History ==
A bluecoat school was founded in Walsall towards the end of the 17th century, to provide children of poor families with an education free of charge. The school had (and still has) strong connections to St Matthew's Church in Walsall, where private contributors and collections funded the school in the early days.

Originally for younger children, the school began educating older pupils in 1884. In 1965 the senior part of the school relocated to its current location in Birmingham Street. The school converted to academy status in 2012, and today forms part of the Walsall Blue Coat Foundation along with Blue Coat Infant School and Blue Coat Junior School. The Walsall Blue Coat Foundation is administered by the Diocese of Lichfield.

== Academics ==
Blue Coat Church of England Academy offers GCSEs and BTECs as programmes of study for pupils, while students in the sixth form have the option to study from a range of A-levels and further BTECs.
