= Ian Stuart (designer) =

British fashion designer

Ian Stuart (1967 – 18 October 2022) was a British fashion designer, noted for his wedding dresses and evening and occasion wear.

Born Ian Stuart Humphreys in Leiden, The Netherlands, Ian was protégé of Bellville Sassoon, who counted numerous socialites and the royal family as amongst their clients. He was based at The Blewcoat in Westminster from 2014 to 2022 and was part of a Channel 4 television series The Posh Frock Shop, which featured one customer purchasing a gown from his store in each episode in 2018.

Stuart won the Bridal Designer of the Year at the Bridal Buyer Awards in 2004, 2005, 2006, 2007, Outstanding Contribution to the Industry 2008, and UK Bridal Designer of the Year in 2010. His collections included Lady Luxe, Supernova, Frill Me, Killer Queen, Revolution Rocks!, Paramount and Belle Epoque. His label Ian Stuart Bride was sold all over the world from 2003 to 2020. Ian's design Flower Bomb was featured in the V&A Exhibition Wedding Dresses 1775–2014.

Ian succumbed to Systemic Sclerosis (Scleroderma), an autoimmune disease on 18 October 2022.
