= Bluecoat School, Chester =

School in Cheshire, England

Blue Coat School, Chester
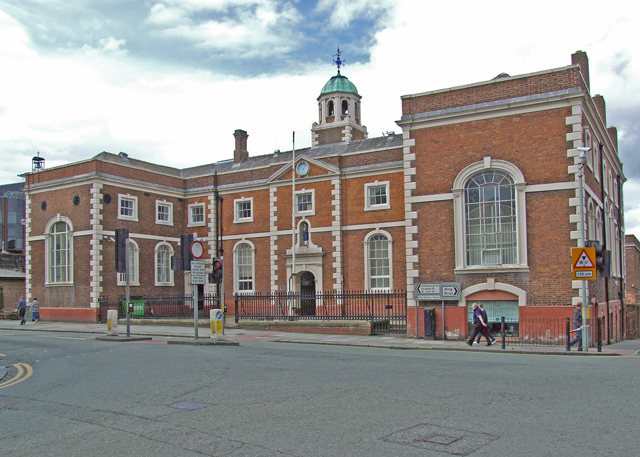
- Blue Coat School, Chester

- Location in Cheshire
- 53.1940°N 2.8938°W
- Location: Upper Northgate Street, Chester, Cheshire, England
- OS grid reference: SJ 404 667

History
- Built: 1717

Listed Building – Grade II*
- Designated: 28 July 1955
- Reference no.: 1375966

The Blue Coat School was located on Upper Northgate Street, Chester, Cheshire, England. It was housed in the Bluecoat building, which is recorded in the National Heritage List for England as a designated Grade II* listed building.

== History ==
Before the school was built, it was the site of a medieval hospital. In 1700 a charity school was built in the precincts of Chester Cathedral; it was the first school outside London to be established by the Society for Promoting Christian Knowledge. The charity school was moved to the Blue Coat School, which was built in 1717. Almshouses were built behind the school. The school was originally an L-shaped building, with its main wing on Upper Northgate Street, and a south wing looking towards Chester city walls. The south wing contained a chapel, and the main wing the schoolroom and dormitories. In 1733 a north wing was added. A new façade was added to the main wing in 1854, and new almshouses were built. The clock was added the following year. The school closed in 1949, and the buildings were occupied by the Chester College of Higher Education (now part of the University of Chester). The Bluecoat building is owned by The Chester Bluecoat Charity and is currently a charity hub, home to many Chester based charities. Its name has been incorporated in the title of Bishops' Blue Coat Church of England High School.

== Architecture ==
The building has a symmetrical U-shaped plan, and is constructed in brick with stone dressings. It has a hipped roof in grey slate, and is in two storeys. The main block has five bays, with the entrance bay in the centre; the second and fourth bays are recessed. Between the bays, and on the corners of the building, are rusticated quoins. The entrance bay leads to a through passage. The entrance is surrounded by a Tuscan-style doorcase with a basket arch. Above it is a niche containing the painted statue of a Blue Coat boy sculpted by Edward Richardson. In the upper storey is a six-pane sash window, above which is a pediment containing a circular clock face. The recessed bays contain a basket-arched 19-pane sash window, and each lateral bay has a doorway with pilasters, above which is a blank panel. Between the storeys is a stone band. Every bay in the upper storey has a sash window similar to that in the central bay. Centrally on top of the block is an octagonal cupola with a copper roof. The internal faces of the lateral wings have fenestration similar to that in the main block. Their front faces have basket-arched sash windows, and the north wing has an additional basement window.

== See also ==
- Grade II* listed buildings in Cheshire West and Chester
