= Bishops' Blue Coat Church of England High School =

The Bishops' Blue Coat Church of England High School, Chester

Location
- Vaughans Lane; Chester, Cheshire, CH3 5XF; England; 53°11′03″N 2°51′59″W

Information
- Type: Academy
- Motto: Known. Nurtured. Inspired
- Religious affiliation: Church of England
- Established: 1984
- Local authority: Cheshire West and Chester
- Department for Education URN: 136543 Tables
- Ofsted: Reports
- Chair: Ralph Mainard
- Head teacher: Helen Cairns
- Staff: 144
- Gender: Coeducational
- Age: 11 to 18
- Enrolment: 1,022
- Colours: Navy Blue / Mint Green
- Website: https://www.bishopschester.co.uk

The Bishops' Blue Coat Church of England High School is a coeducational secondary school and sixth form located in Chester, United Kingdom. It is an academy and has STEM Assured status.

Ofsted rated the School 'Good' in an inspection in March 2015. It is also one of ten schools in the UK to have achieved STEM assured status.

== School history ==
The Bishops' Blue Coat Church of England High School was founded in 1984 after an agreement between Cheshire County Council and the Church of England. The Bishops of Chester and Birkenhead were instrumental in the school's foundation. It had actually been built as the Dee County High School which had opened in 1977. The then Education Secretary Keith Joseph as well as the LEA was involved in the transfer of the school from Council to Voluntary Aided status in 1984.

The Bishops' High School is the only Anglican secondary school in the Cheshire West & Chester Local Authority and at present one of only two within the Chester Diocese. The other, Sir Thomas Boteler Church of England High School, is in Warrington.

Since 1984 the school has grown in size. In 2016/17, there were 1,022 pupils.

== Academy status ==
The results of a consultation between 14 December 2010 and 13 January 2011 indicated a clear majority of parents, staff and the wider community to be in favour of the school applying for Academy Status. The Bishop of Chester, the Diocesan Board of Education and the Blue Coat Foundation expressed their support for the change of status, and The Bishops' Blue Coat Church of England High School became an Academy on 1 April 2011.

== 2017 Exam Results ==
In 2017, 74% of A Level students obtained A* to C grades. 447 A and A* grades were awarded in 2017, with 72% of GCSE students achieving 5+ A* to C grades.

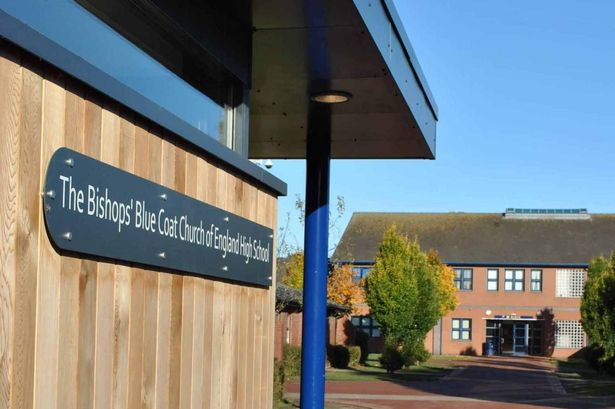
The School Reception and the "W" Block

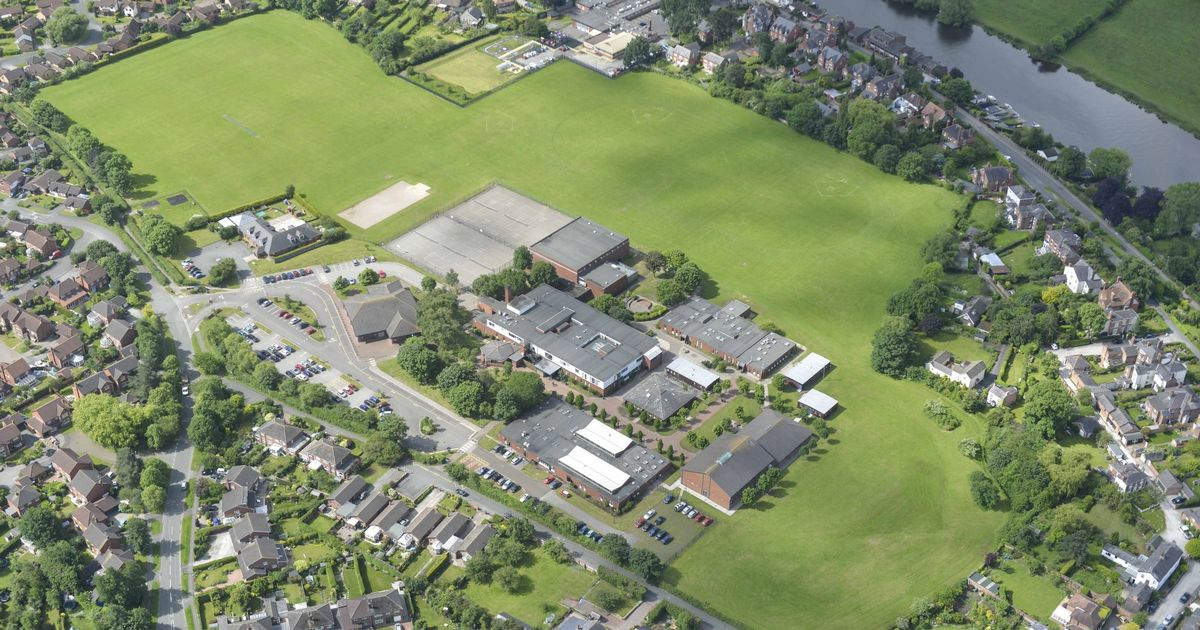
