= Liverpool Blue Coat School =

Location
- Church Road; Wavertree, Liverpool, L15 9EE; England; 53.393°N 2.916°W

Information
- Type: Grammar school Academy
- Motto: Non Sibi Sed Omnibus (Not for Oneself but for All)
- Established: 1708; 318 years ago
- Founders: Bryan Blundell and Rev. Robert Styth
- Department for Education URN: 137916 Tables
- Ofsted: Reports
- Headteacher: Kevin Sexton (Interim)
- Chaplain: Interregnum
- Gender: Coeducational (since 2002)
- Age: 11 to 18
- Enrollment: 1107
- Alumni: Old Blues
- Houses: Curie; Franklin; Roscoe; Seacole; Tod; Turing
- Website: bluecoatschoolliverpool.org.uk

The Liverpool Blue Coat School is a selective, co-educational, state secondary school with academy status in Liverpool, England. It was formerly a grammar school, founded in 1708 by Bryan Blundell and the Reverend Robert Styth as the Liverpool Blue Coat Hospital and was for many years a boys' boarding school before restoring in 2002 its original policy of accepting boys and girls.

The school holds a long-standing academic tradition; the acceptance rate to be admitted is around fifteen per cent. Examination results consistently place the Blue Coat top of the national GCSE and A-level tables. In 2015 it was The Sunday Times State School of the Year. And in 2016 the Blue Coat was ranked as the best school in the country based on GCSE results.

== History ==
=== The Bluecoat School ===
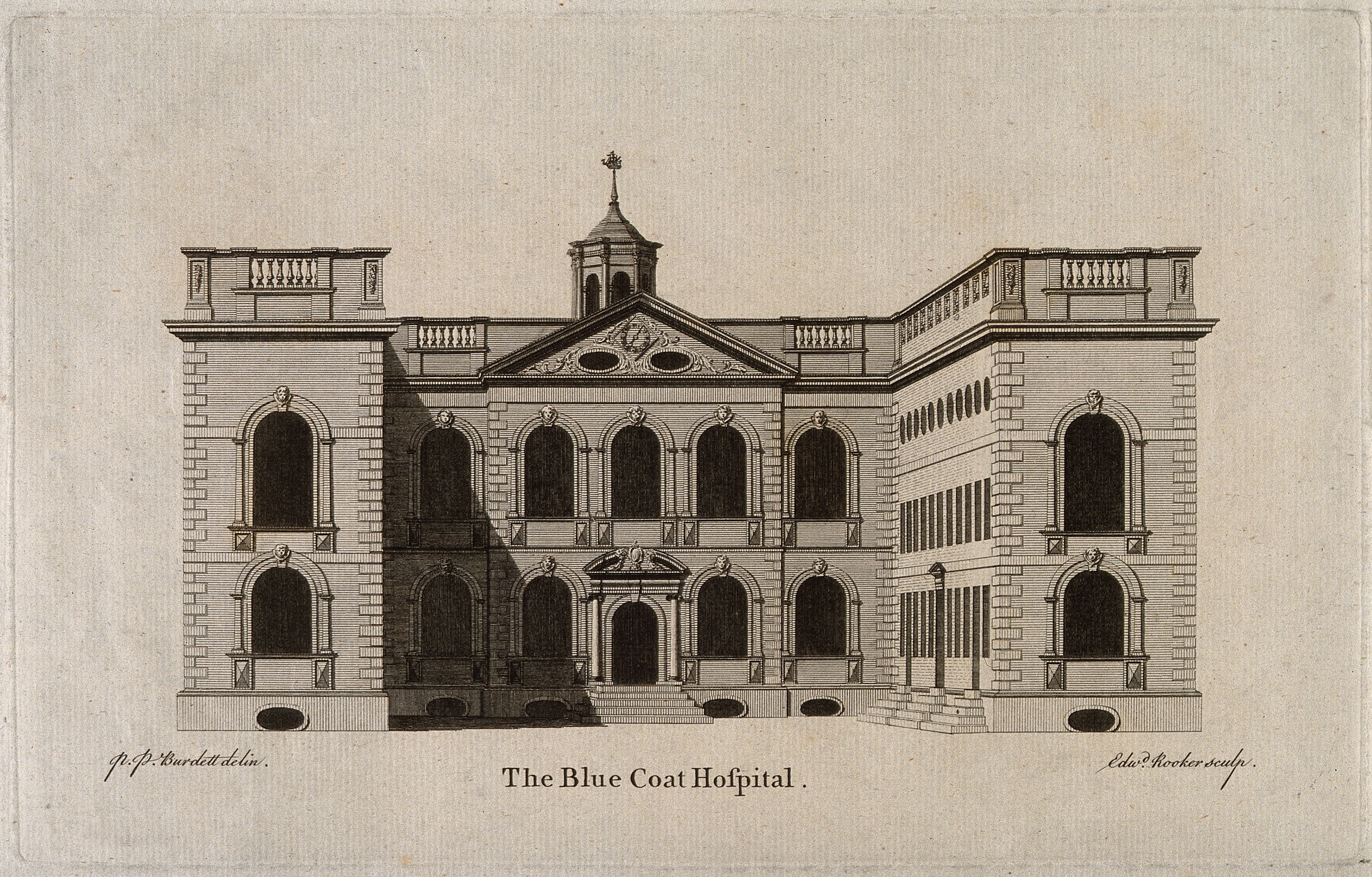
An engraving of the original school in the city centre

The school was founded in 1708 by Bryan Blundell and the Rev Robert Styth, a theology graduate of Brasenose College, Oxford as "a school for teaching poor children to read, write and cast accounts". The original charity school expanded rapidly and a new building, the present Bluecoat Arts Centre, opened in 1718. By the time of Blundell's death in 1756 there were 70 boys and 30 girls at the school, many apprenticed to local trades, especially maritime ones connected to the port. Some Old Blues became mates or masters of their ships, many emigrating to the colonies. After Blundell's death his sons further expanded the building to accommodate 200 pupils, with a new workroom, sick room, chapel and refectory. A reminder of the building's school days is some graffiti dating from the 18th century, carved into cornerstones in a secluded part of the front courtyard.

=== Move to Wavertree ===
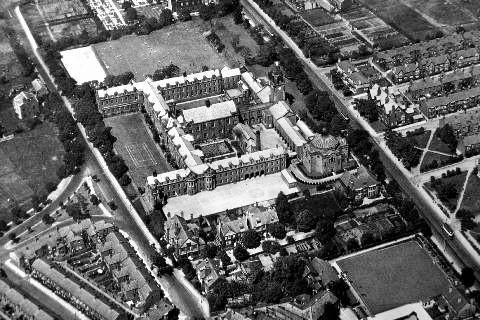
Wavertree campus

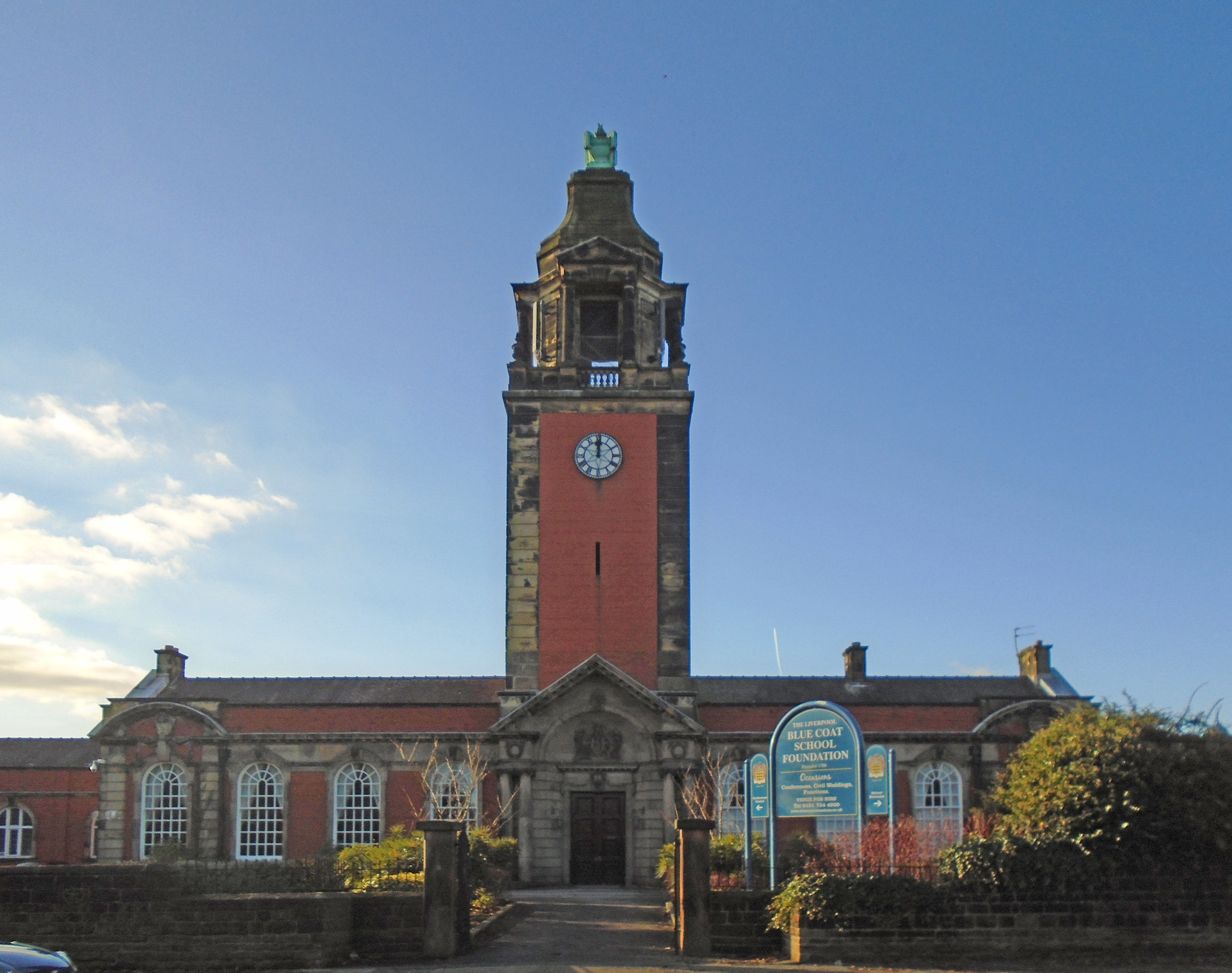
Clock tower

At the start of the 20th century it was decided that the school needed to move from the polluted town centre to somewhere quieter, and the village of Wavertree was the site chosen. The architects chosen for the design of the new building were Briggs, Wolstenholme & Thornely, most notable for the design of the Port of Liverpool Building. In 1906 the school took possession of the building, which was later designated Grade II-listed*. Later additions include a clock tower and the Fenwick Memorial Chapel: used for assemblies by the school.

=== Redevelopment ===
In September 1990, the school stopped accepting boarders.

In 2004 the school received a government grant of almost £8 million, together with £1 million from its foundation governors, enabling an expansion and redevelopment of its site.

In 2004 work began on redeveloping the Wavertree site. Original buildings remained intact but the southern wing was converted into private accommodation and sold to part-fund the development. The school chapel, clock tower, board room, and former music room, together with administrative rooms and the entrance to the original building, were transferred to a new school foundation.

== House system ==
The school operates a house system with six houses. Upon entry in Year 7, pupils are assigned to a house, which determines their form group until the sixth form, and they remain part of this house throughout their time at the school. Teachers are also frequently affiliated with a house. Each form consists of 30 students, with 180 students per year group.

The houses are overseen by a House Council, which includes Heads of House, House Deputies, Form Captains, and a member of staff. Regular inter-house competitions take place, ranging from football to debating, with house points awarded and tallied in a league table that is updated throughout the year, culminating in the annual inter-house league standings.

In 2021, the school undertook a comprehensive review of the house system to ensure its relevance to contemporary values. This project, led by Dr. Wainwright from the History & Politics Department and the student-led History Society, examined the legacies of historical figures associated with the school. As part of this process, the project investigated Bryan Blundell's connections to the slavery-based economy of the eighteenth century.

The findings revealed several key points: while Blundell was not a captain of a slave-trading ship, he derived income from trading tobacco, sugar, and tar. Although Blundell did not engage in the trade of enslaved persons before 1709, he was involved in the trade of indentured servants. Evidence suggests that he likely profited from slave labour in the production of goods and later engaged in the trade of enslaved people. He also lobbied for the expansion of the trade in enslaved Africans and was a prominent member of an organisation that facilitated this trade. Additionally, the Blundell family established a dynasty that not only engaged in the slave trade but also owned enslaved people in Liverpool.

The review concluded that the previous house names, which honoured founders and trustees, might not align with modern perspectives on diversity and inclusion. Consequently, new house names were chosen to reflect historical figures considered more representative of these values.

The Blundell family's involvement in the slavery-based economy was not unique, as such practices were common in Georgian Liverpool. Many individuals who profited from slavery viewed themselves as good Christians and philanthropists, often overlooking the rights of the enslaved. Simultaneously, some contemporaries opposed slavery and were involved in the abolitionist movement.

The current school houses are named as follows:

- Curie (formerly Bingham)
  Named after Marie Curie, a pioneering physicist and chemist who discovered polonium and radium, earning two Nobel Prizes.
- Franklin (formerly Blundell, named after school founder Bryan Blundell)
  Named after Rosalind Franklin, a key scientist in DNA research, whose X-ray diffraction work was crucial to understanding its structure.
- Roscoe (formerly Graham)
  Named after William Roscoe, MP for Liverpool, historian, and early advocate for abolishing the transatlantic slave trade.
- Seacole (formerly Shirley, named after W. H. Shirley, a trustee and funder)
  Named after Mary Seacole, a British-Jamaican nurse known for her medical care during the Crimean War.
- Tod (name unchanged)
  Named after the Tod family, long-term philanthropic supporters who helped sustain the school.
- Turing (formerly Styth, after Reverend Robert Styth, a founder)
  Named after Alan Turing, mathematician and codebreaker, instrumental in breaking the German Enigma code during WWII.

The houses, Turing and Tod, were added in 2015 and 2017, respectively.

The school also previously had several boarding houses, which ceased when boarding was discontinued in the late 20th century:

- Earle
- MacAuley
- Styth
- Tinne

== Brotherly Society ==
The school's alumni association is the Brotherly Society, founded in 1838. Alumni are known as "Old Blues". The society was set up to provide help, advice and in some cases financial assistance to students for at least two years after leaving the school. Since the Second World War there has been less need for such assistance so the Society has turned its efforts towards objects that would benefit the School in general.

The generosity of the Society can be found throughout the Blue Coat School's history. In 1938, to celebrate the Society's centenary, the Society provided the oak pews in the chapel. In 1963 the Society provided the stained glass south window of the Chapel to celebrate its 125th anniversary, and in 1952 the Old Blues' Memorial Library was presented in remembrance of the Old Blues who gave their lives in the two World Wars.

== Headteachers ==
=== 18th century ===
1. The Reverend Robert Styth, M.A. (1708–1713)
2. Mr William Trenton (1717–1723)
3. Mr Theophilus Price (1723–1725)
4. Mr Horton (1725–1775)
5. The Reverend John Shakleton (1776–1779)
6. Mr John Smith (1779–1799)
7. Mr Robert Parkes (1800)

=== 19th century ===
8. Mr George Chambers (1801–1811)
9. Mr John Fallows (1812–1816)
10. Mr R.W. Bamford (1817–1819)
11. Mr William Forster (1820–1848)
12. Mr Thomas Wood, B.A. (1849–1862)
13. Mr Thomas Haughton (1863–1867)
14. Mr George Tinker (1868–1869)
15. Mr Thomas Haughton (1870–1888)
16. Mr Arthur Mercer (1889–1920)

=== 20th century ===
17. Mr Harry C. Hughes (1920–1926)
18. The Reverend R. Bruce Wilson, B.A. (1927–1944)
19. The Reverend T.C. Heritage, M.A. (1944–1945)
20. Mr G.G. Watcyn, B.A. (1945–1968)
21. Mr H.P. Arnold-Craft J.P., M.A. (OXON) (1968–1989)
22. Mr J.C. Speller, B.A., M.A. (Ed.), F.R.S.A. (1989–1997)
23. Mr M.R. Bell, B.A. (Hons), F.I.Mgt. (1997–2000)

=== 21st century ===
24. Mr M.G. Tittershill (2001–2008)
25. Mrs D.A. Silcock (2008–2015)
26. Mr M. Pennington (2015–2020)
27. Ms S. Yates (2020–2024)
28. Mr K. Sexton (2024–present)

== The Squirrel ==
The school's publication is The Squirrel. The magazine is currently published annually and is almost entirely written and produced by students. The magazine was first released in the Summer of 1949 under the leadership of the Provost John Bingham in order to show the 'fruits of hard work' and the activities, achievements, and involvement of the students and staff in school life.

During the 1950s The Squirrel entered an era of particular popularity and enthusiasm, ultimately leading to its publication becoming a termly occurrence. It was during this period that the magazine developed some of its most memorable features, notably including De Praefectis which recorded the various humorous situations and conversations of prefects at the school and is mostly remembered for satirising the eccentricities of individual prefects, often employing a pretentious overuse of Latin to this effect. In subsequent years various other magazines written by students were produced as parodies of The Squirrel, most notably in the form of The Swivel which gained an underground following and was particularly popular on account of the strong criticisms it leveled at the school and its masters.

In 2017 the school published The Squirrel both in paper form and online for the first time. A new website 'The Squirrel Blog' was created both to publish current and future editions of the magazine and to digitalise the school's archive of every issue of The Squirrel since 1949.

== Notable alumni ==
- Richard Ansdell, painter
- Mitch Benn, musician and comedian
- Graham Bickley, actor
- Stephen Broadbent, sculptor
- Philip Clarke, businessman
- Craig Curran, footballer
- Stuart Ford, entertainment executive
- Evan Harris, politician
- Jonathan Harvey, playwright
- Graham Hughes, adventurer
- Alfred Lennon, father of John Lennon
- Kevin Nolan, footballer and coach
- Andrew Norton, roboticist and politician
- Steve Parry, swimmer
- Chris Rennard, Baron Rennard
- Gareth Roberts (statistician)
- Paul Thwaite, banker, CEO of NatWest Group
- Sir Oswald Stoll, variety hall owner and film producer
