= Bluecoat Chambers =

Grade I listed building, now arts centre, in Liverpool, United Kingdom

The Bluecoat
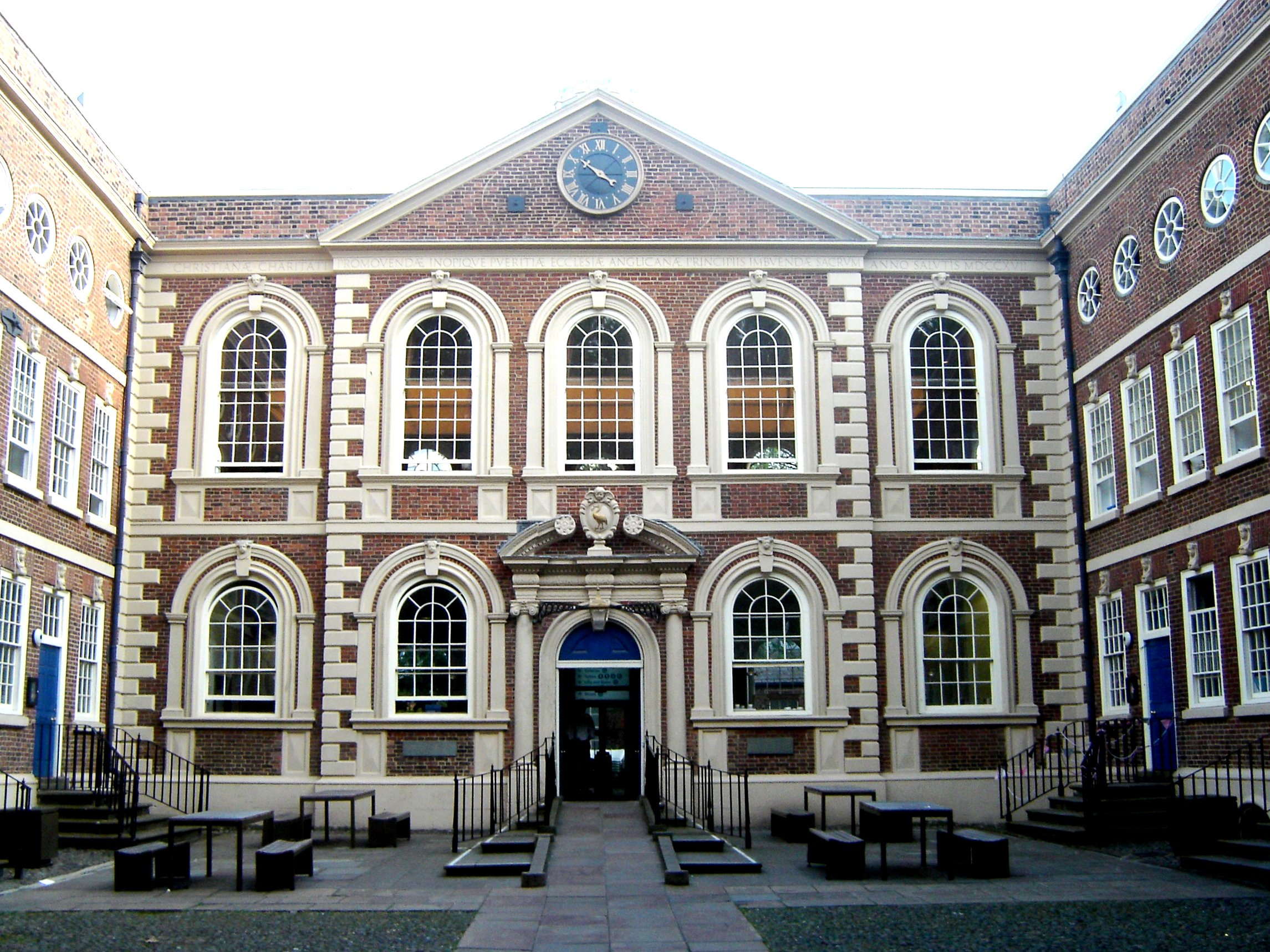

- Location within Liverpool
- Former names: Bluecoat School; Bluecoat Chambers; Bluecoat Arts Centre

General information
- Architectural style: Queen Anne
- Location: School Lane, Liverpool, Merseyside, England
- Coordinates: 53.4042°N 2.9839°W
- Construction started: 1716
- Completed: 1725

Website
- www.thebluecoat.org.uk

Built in 1716–17 as a charity school, Bluecoat Chambers in School Lane is the oldest surviving building in central Liverpool, England. Following the Liverpool Blue Coat School's move to another site in 1906, the building was rented from 1907 onwards by the Sandon Studios Society. Based on the presence of this art society and the subsequent formation of the Bluecoat Society of Arts in 1927, the successor organisation laid claim to being the oldest arts centre in Great Britain, now called the Bluecoat.

== History ==
The school was founded in 1708 by the Reverend Robert Styth (died 1713), rector of Liverpool, and Bryan Blundell, a sea captain and later twice Mayor of Liverpool (1721–22 and 1728–29). Originally constructed in 1716–17, the building was extended until 1718 to function as a boarding school. By the following year, it had 50 children, with room for 100 more, and construction was finally completed in 1725.

After the school moved to a new site in Wavertree in 1906, the building was threatened with demolition. It was rented out from 1907 to the Sandon Studios Society, an independent art school and art society. The building's future still unsecured, it took the intervention of the architect Charles Herbert Reilly, head of the Liverpool School of Architecture. He convinced the industrialist William Lever to rent Bluecoat Chambers in 1909 and subsequently buy it, renaming it Liberty Buildings. Sharing the space with the Sandon Society, Reilly moved in with his School of Architecture from 1909 until shortly after World War I. In 1913–14, Lever entertained the thought of a larger building scheme to transform Liberty Buildings into an art centre but, by 1918, got tired with the idea. Lever's death in 1925 again led to proposals for demolition. A successful campaign to raise money for the purchase of Bluecoat Chambers resulted in the establishment of the Bluecoat Society of Arts in 1927 as a charitable trust to run the building.

On 3 May 1941, during the Liverpool Blitz, the concert hall and adjoining rooms were severely damaged by an incendiary bomb and during the following night the rear wing was destroyed by a bomb blast. Restoration took place after the war, being completed by 1951. It is recorded in the National Heritage List for England as a designated Grade I listed building, having been designated on 28 June 1952.

The Bluecoat Display Centre, a contemporary craft gallery, opened in the rear courtyard in 1959. Being known as the Bluecoat Arts Centre from the 1980s, it is now simply called the Bluecoat. From 2005, the building was further restored and a new wing added. It was reopened in March 2008 to coincide with Liverpool's year as European Capital of Culture.

== Architecture ==
The Bluecoat is built in brick with painted stone dressings and a slate roof. H-shaped in plan, originally the rear of the school resembled the front but in 1821 it was remodeled giving it a convex-shaped elevation. The front encloses three sides of a quadrangle and is separated from School Lane by a low wall with railings and gatepiers. The central block of five bays has two storeys with round-arched windows; the central three bays project forwards under a pediment containing a clock which has only an hour hand. On the roof is an octagonal cupola with round-arched openings, attached Ionic columns and a copper cap with a finial. The wings have three storeys; they are eleven bays long and one bay wide. On the ground and first floor the windows are square-headed while those on the top floor are oval. The end elevations have arched windows which match the central block. All the large windows have keystones with cherubs' heads. The main door in the centre of the central block has Ionic columns with a broken pediment containing a cartouche of the arms of Liverpool. Each wing has three square-headed doors approached by steps. The wall, railings and gate piers on School Lane are also listed at Grade I.

The 2005-2008 renovation at a cost of £14 million also included a new 2250 square metre extension, the architects being BIQ Architecten. The architects found that there were 32 different floor levels in the old building. They carried out much structural change to produce exhibition areas with better accessibility. The new extension is built mainly in brick to link with the old building, although it has a copper roof and more modern materials internally. The new wing houses a flexible performance area and four art galleries. In addition, the complex provides studios for artists and craftspeople, a restaurant and a café and a number of retail outlets. On 13 May 2008, a fire broke out in a kitchen on the first floor of the west wing causing significant damage, although 80% of the building was unaffected.

== Arts Centre ==
Over the years the Bluecoat hosted a range of cultural and arts-associated events. These included art exhibitions, debates, discussions, public meetings and campaigns, poetry readings, musical concerts and recitals, and cultural lectures. It held book, record, and antiques fairs and became a centre for working artists and craftspeople.

Some of the events have continued to hold a place in history. The 1908 exhibition of works mostly by members of the Sandon Society also included the first showing in Liverpool of Claude Monet who received a special invite. In 1911, the Sandon Society took on parts of Roger Fry's London Post-Impressionist exhibition, showing works by Picasso, Matisse, Cézanne, and Van Gogh for the first time in the UK outside the capital. In 1967 Yoko Ono appeared at the Bluecoat, at a time before she met John Lennon. The Bluecoat was also visited by performing artists as Stravinsky, Michael Nyman, Doris Lessing and the Last Poets.

== Bluecoat today ==
The Bluecoat was reopened on 15 March 2008, during Liverpool's year as a European Capital of Culture, by Andy Burnham, the Secretary of State for Culture, Media and Sport. The opening exhibition, entitled Now Then, showed work by five artists, including Yoko Ono. During the early summer a display entitled Mr Roscoe's Garden, comprising part of Liverpool's Botanic Collection, was held.

The Bluecoat organises exhibitions, events, education programmes and concerts. It also contains 22 artists studios. The Bluecoat Cafe serves a variety of homemade and locally sourced food and drink.

Since the reopening, the galleries have held major exhibitions by Bruce Asbestos, John Akomfrah, Mark Leckey, Sonia Boyce, Keith Piper, Siobhan Davies Dance and Niamh O'Malley, amongst others.

== Gallery of external features ==
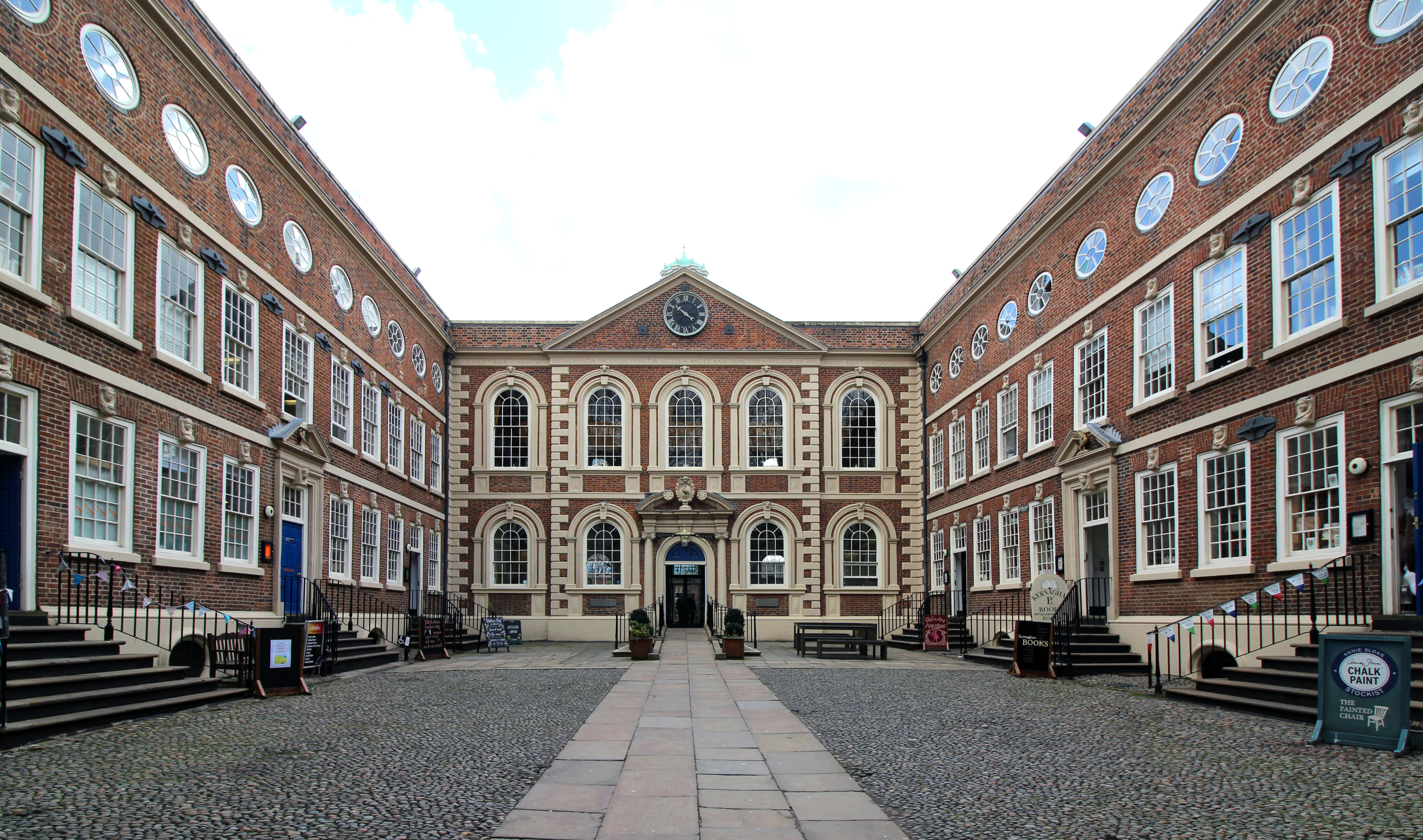
Exterior view

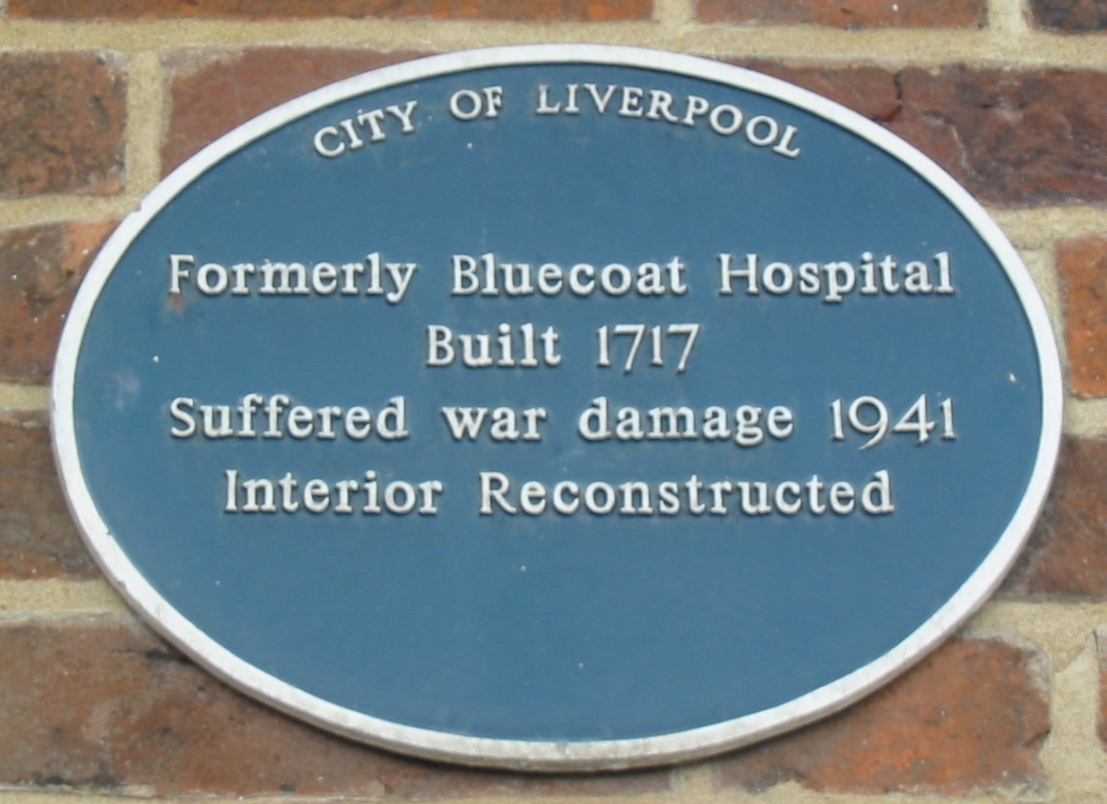
Blue plaque

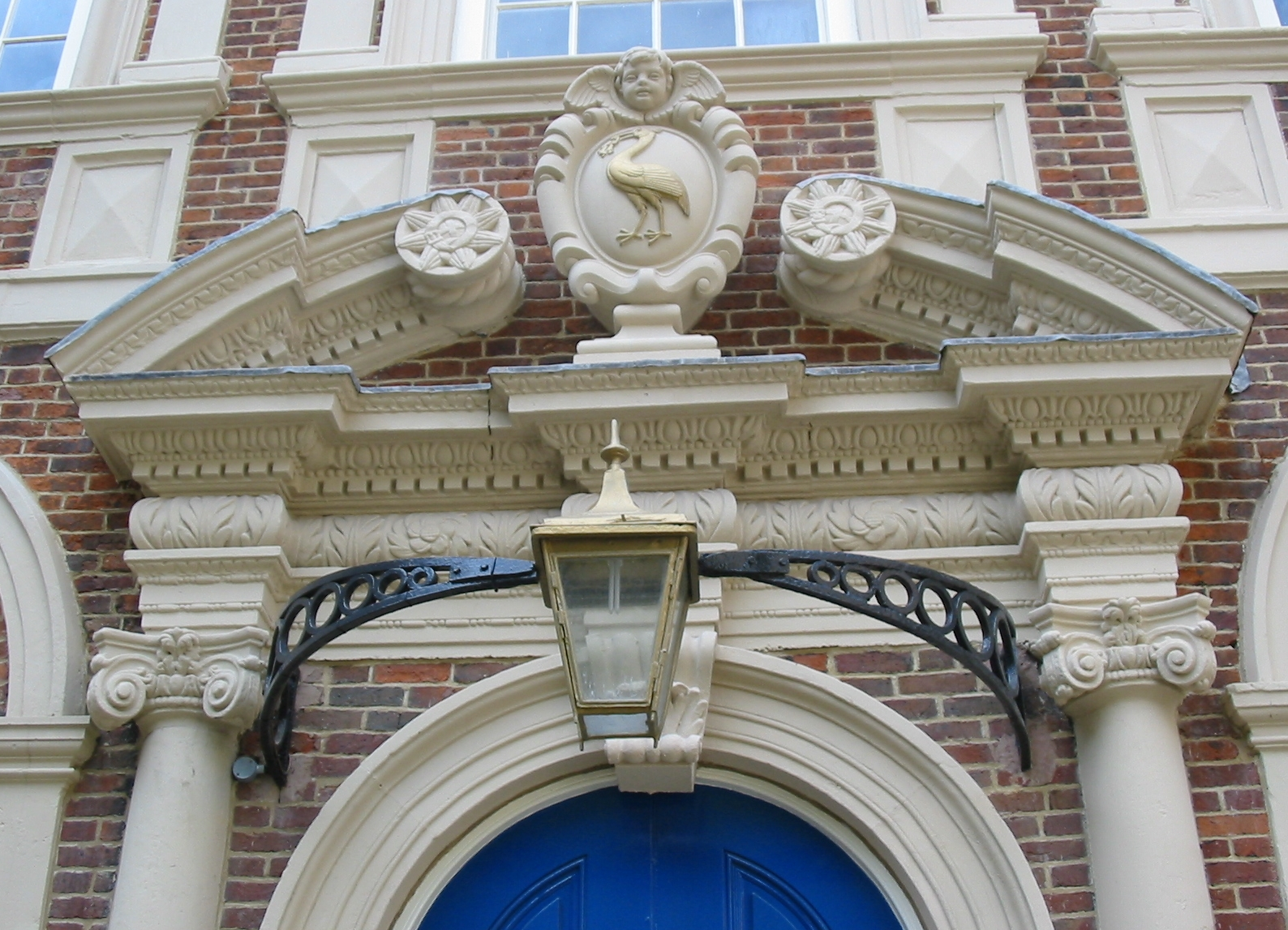
Sculpted entrance

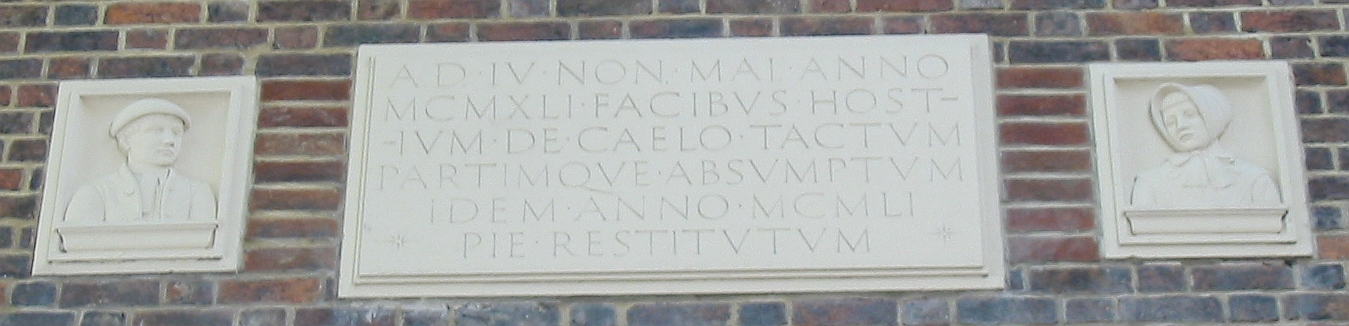
Marble plaque with Latin inscription detailing war damage and restoration

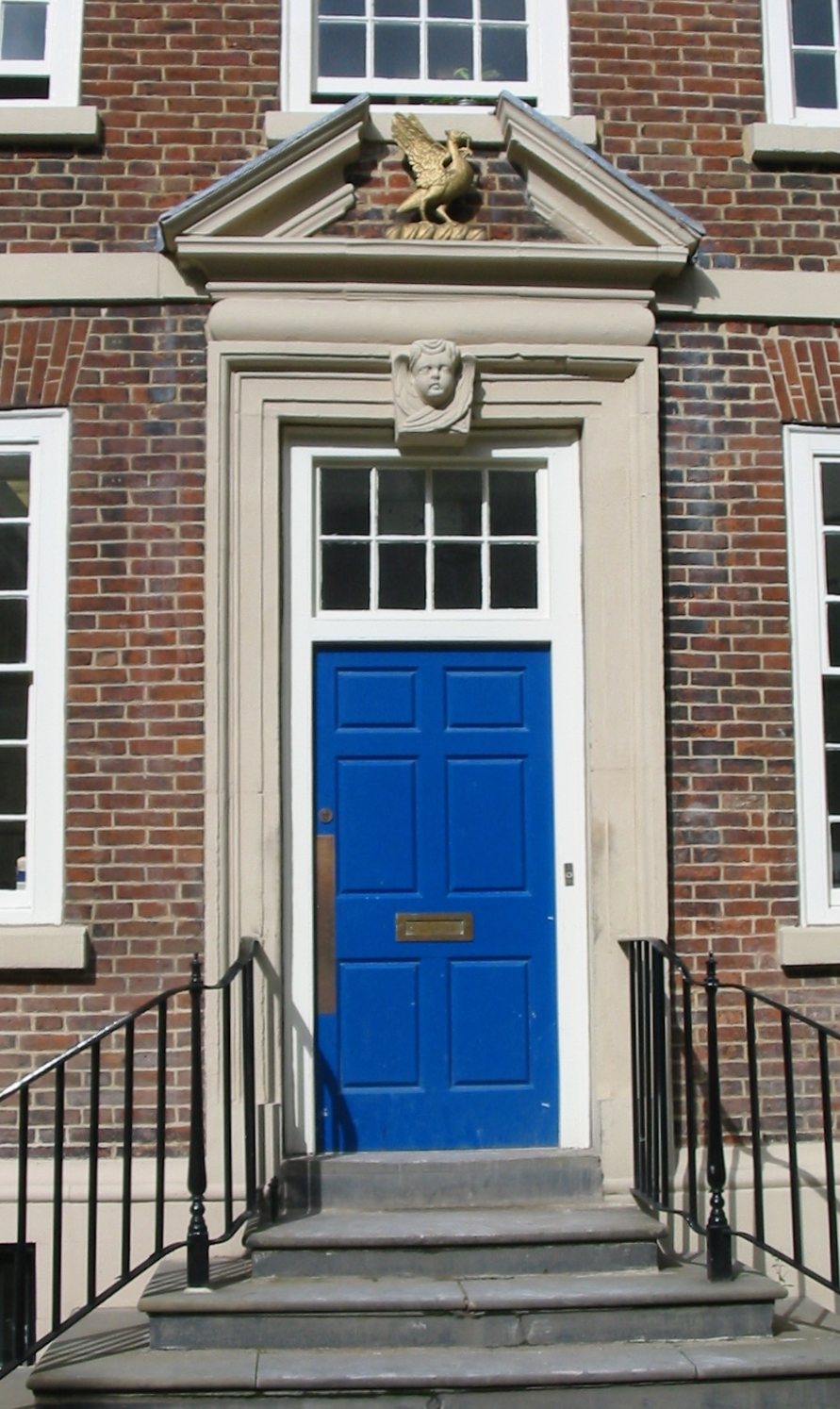
Door

== See also ==
- Grade I listed buildings in Merseyside
- Architecture of Liverpool
