= Isaac Wood =

Isaac Wood may refer to:

- Isaac Wood (priest) (1795–1865), archdeacon of Chester
- Isaac Wood, pioneer and the namesake for Woodland, the original name of Lacey, Washington
- Isaac L. Wood (1822–1858), American murderer
- Isaac Wood (musician), musician and ex-member of the band Black Country, New Road
- Isaac Whood (1689–1752), painter
