= Thomas Breithweite =

Thomas Breithweite, D.D., sometime Rector of Stepney, was Archdeacon of Chester from his installation on 11 March 1797 until his death on 29 December 1800.

Church of England titles
Preceded by George Travis	Archdeacon of Chester; 1797–1800	Succeeded by Unwin Clarke
