= George Snell =

George Snell may refer to:

- George Snell (archdeacon of Totnes) (died 1701), Anglican archdeacon
- George Snell (archdeacon of Chester), Anglican archdeacon
- George Dixon Snell (1836–1911), mayor of Spanish Fork, Utah
- George Davis Snell (1903–1996), American geneticist
- George Snell (bishop) (1907–2006), Bishop in the Anglican Church of Canada
