= Edward Woolnough =

Edward Woolnough (5 July 1793 – 27 November 1867) was Archdeacon of Chester from July 1865 until his death.

Woolnough was born at Boyton, Suffolk and educated at Christ's College, Cambridge. He was at Whitton from 1821 until 1849; and Northenden from 1849.

Church of England titles
Preceded by Isaac Wood	Archdeacon of Chester; 1865–1866	Succeeded by Richard Greenall
