= Grade II listed buildings in Chester (north and west) =

Chester is a city in Cheshire, England. It contains over 650 structures that are designated as listed buildings by English Heritage and included in the National Heritage List for England. Of these, over 500 are listed at Grade II, the lowest of the three gradings given to listed buildings and applied to "buildings of national importance and special interest". This list contains the Grade II listed buildings in the unparished area of the city to the north and west of the Chester city walls.

The listed buildings in this area of the city are mainly those resulting in its expansion outside the walls from the middle of the 18th century, and includes houses, public houses, hotels, shops, churches and associated structures, schools, and mileposts. In 1779 the Chester Canal, later part of the Shropshire Union Canal, opened and passes through this area. There are listed structures associated with the canal, including locks, bridges, and a boatyard.

Name and location	Photograph	Date	Notes
Garden wall and gate piers, Newton Hall; 53.20891°N 2.87479°W	—	c. 1700	The garden wall is in brick with stone coping; it formerly carried wrought iron railings. The gate piers are in stone; the gates have been removed.
11A, 11B and 13 Upper Northgate Street; 53.19471°N 2.89382°W	—	Mid-18th century	A pair of houses, later converted into a shop and flats. The building is in brick with hipped slate roofs, in three storeys with a front of four bays. The ground floor contains a recessed colonnade with three Doric columns flanked by rusticated piers, behind which is a modern shop front. In the upper storeys are sash windows with rusticated wedge lintels and false keystones.
TS Deva (Sea Cadet Corps); 53.19112°N 2.90209°W	—	1750s or 1760s	This originated as a warehouse, to which three cottages were later added. The warehouse was later used partly as a dwelling and partly as premises for a sea cadet corps. The building is in brick with a slate roof. The former warehouse is in three storeys, and the cottages in two storeys. The warehouse has openings of varying types, including loading doors. The windows in the cottages are horizontal sliding sashes.
102A Hoole Road; 53.20478°N 2.86511°W	—	Late 18th century (probable)	Originally an estate house, with a storage wing added in the 19th century. The house is in three storeys with a slate roof, and the wing has two storeys with a tiled roof. Most of the windows are sashes, with French windows in the house, and an inserted casement in the wing. At the top of the house is a parapet.
5 and 7 Upper Northgate Street; 53.19449°N 2.89380°W	—	Late 18th century (probable)	A pair of brick houses, later used as offices, with slate roofs. They are in three storeys and each has a front of two bays. Both doorways are round-headed with fanlights; No. 5 has a doorcase with fluted pillars and an ornamented architrave. The windows are sashes with wedge lintels. At the top of the building is a modillion cornice.
Poplar House; 53.19938°N 2.88017°W	—	Late 18th century	A detached brick house on a stone plinth with a slate roof. It is in two storeys and has a symmetrical three-bay front, the central front projecting forward under a pedimented gable. Four steps lead up to the round-headed doorway, which has a fanlight. The windows are sashes with wedge lintels.
Chemistry Lock and Sluice; 53.19410°N 2.86815°W		c. 1775	The lock and sluice on the Shropshire Union Canal were designed by Samuel Weston for the Chester Canal Company. The lock chamber is constructed in brick with some blocks of sandstone. Both pairs of lock gates are steel. The sluice is lined with sandstone.
Hoole Lane Lock; 53.19378°N 2.87365°W		c. 1775	The lock on the Shropshire Union Canal was designed by Samuel Weston for the Chester Canal Company. It is built in sandstone and brick. The upper gates are in timber and the lower gates are steel.
Northgate Bridge; 53.19390°N 2.89342°W		c. 1790	A bridge carrying Northgate Street across the Shropshire Union Canal, its construction possibly supervised by Thomas Telford. The bridge is built in sandstone and consists of a single segmental arch. At street level are tapering stone piers with railings between.
Northgate Locks; 53.19329°N 2.89726°W		c. 1790	A flight of three staircase locks on the Shropshire Union Canal designed by Thomas Telford. They are built in sandstone, and each lock has double gates, most of which are in steel. There is a footbridge across each lock, and the paving, ramps and steps are in stone and brick.
Northgate Lock Keeper's Cottage; 53.19352°N 2.89665°W		c. 1790	The cottage stands by Northgate Lock on the Shropshire Union Canal and was probably designed by Thomas Telford. It is built in brick on a sandstone plinth, and has a hipped Welsh slate roof. On the canal front are brick pilasters, and on the west side is a porch. The windows are sashes.
Telford's Warehouse; 53.19327°N 2.89870°W		c. 1790	The warehouse was designed by Thomas Telford, and has since been converted into a restaurant. It is built in brick with a slate roof, and partly overhangs the Shropshire Union Canal to allow for boats to be loaded and unloaded. It is in two blocks, that facing Raymond Street having two storeys, and the block facing Tower Wharf with three storeys. The surviving original windows are sashes.
Bridge of Sighs; 53.19386°N 2.89372°W		1793	The bridge was designed by Joseph Turner to cross the Shropshire Union Canal. It was built to allow prisoners in Northgate prison, on the south side of the canal, to attend the chapel in the Bluecoat School on the north side before their execution. The bridge is built in sandstone and consists of a single arch; the railings have been removed.
Diocesan House; 53.19331°N 2.89840°W		1790s (probably)	This was originally built as offices for the Ellesmere Canal and known as Wetherall Hall. A tavern was added in about 1815, and since then the whole building has been used as offices. It is built in brick, with the front stuccoed, and has a slate roof. The building is in two storeys, and has a symmetrical front of three bays, the central bay protruding forward and pedimented. The porch forms a single-storey wing to the left. The windows are sashes, those in the ground floor being round-headed.
5 Sealand Road; 53.19420°N 2.90494°W		c. 1800	A brick house, later used as an office, with a slate roof. It is in two storeys with a basement. The front facing the River Dee has a door with a pilastered case, and on the front facing Sealand Road is a canted bay window. The windows are sashes, one of which is horizontally-sliding.
2 and 4 Upper Northgate Street; 53.19406°N 2.89331°W		c. 1800	A pair of houses, later altered and used as offices, on a stone plinth with slate roofs. They are in three storeys with basements. The porches are recessed and round-headed, and the doors have fanlights. The windows are sashes. Between the street and the basement area are wrought iron railings; these are included in the listing.
10 Upper Northgate Street; 53.19450°N 2.89335°W	—	c. 1800	A brick house, later used as surgeries, with a slate roof. It is in three storeys, and has a symmetrical three-bay front. The central doorway has panelled pilasters, and a pediment. The windows are sashes with stone sills and wedge lintels.
Iron Roving Bridge; 53.19471°N 2.89970°W		c. 1800	The roving bridge crosses the Shropshire Union Canal, for which the consulting engineer was Thomas Telford. The bridge is in wrought iron and is carried on brick abutments with stone coping. It is approached on each side by ramps.
Lock Keeper's Cottage, Chemistry Lock; 53.19414°N 2.86787°W		c. 1800	The cottage stands by Chemistry Lock on the Shropshire Union Canal. It is built in painted brick, it has a slate roof, and is in an L-shaped plan. The cottage is in two storeys, and has a mix of sash and casement windows. A separate brick privy and the walled yard are included in the listing.
Northgate House; 53.19381°N 2.89358°W	—	c. 1800	This was built as a toll cottage with a house and workshop on the site of the former city gaol. It is constructed partly in sandstone, and partly in brick, some of which is rendered. The east part is in a single storey, and the west part has two storeys. Most of the windows are sashes, and at the east end of the building is a full-width canted bay window.
4 and 6 Abbot's Grange; 53.19968°N 2.89482°W		Early 19th century	A pair of town houses, built in brick with a hipped slate roof. They are in three storeys and have a front of five bays. One doorway has a fanlight with a segmental arch and sidelights; the other door is plain. At the rear is a 20-pane stair window; the other windows are sashes.
4–18 George Street; 53.19443°N 2.89042°W		Early 19th century	A row of eight brick cottages on a sandstone plinth with slate roofs. They are in two storeys, and each cottage has a single-bay front. The doorways are approached by steps, and the windows are casements.
104-110 Northgate Street; 53.193349°N 2.892981°W	—	Early 19th century	A row of shops and former warehouse with residential accommodation. Originally built in the early 19th century, the frontage is of brown brick with Flemish bond, the uppers floors have windows with stone sills and one-course lintels.
Garden Court; 53.19400°N 2.89454°W		Early 19th century	A house, later divided into two houses. They are built in rendered brick with Welsh slate roofs. The houses are in two storeys, the left house having a modern porch and sash windows. The right house is taller with a round-arched doorway above which is a fanlight. Over the doorway is a sash window, and to the right is a Palladian window in each floor.
Rose Cottage; 53.20592°N 2.86388°W	—	Early 19th century	A house in painted brick with a slate roof in two storeys. Most of the windows are Gothic-style casements containing Y-tracery, above which are hoodmoulds. Over the doorway is a fanlight with four arched panes.
37 and 39 Egerton Street; 53.19441°N 2.88384°W		1829–33	A pair of brick houses, later converted into flats. They are in two storeys with an attic, and have a slate Mansard roof. The windows are sashes, and the doorways have fanlights. In the roof are two gabled dormers.
41 and 43 Egerton Street; 53.19426°N 2.88378°W	—	1829–33	A pair of brick houses, later converted into flats. They are in two storeys with an attic, and have a slate Mansard roof. The windows are sashes, and the doorways have fanlights. In the roof are two gabled dormers.
45, 47 and 49 Egerton Street; 53.19414°N 2.88373°W	—	1829–33	A row of three brick houses, one of which is rendered, that were later converted into flats. They are in two storeys with an attic, and have a slate Mansard roof. The windows are sashes, and the doorways have fanlights. Two of the houses have gabled dormers.
53 and 55 Egerton Street; 53.19402°N 2.88370°W	—	1829–33	A house and a shop, built in brick on a stone plinth. The house has a simple doorcase with a fanlight and sash windows. The shop has a shop front in the lower storey, and a canted oriel window above.
65 and 65A Egerton Street; 53.19367°N 2.88359°W	—	1829–33	A brick house with a hipped slate Mansard roof. It is in two storeys with an attic. The doorway has pilasters and a fanlight, and the windows are sashes. At the top of the house is a stone parapet.
5 Canal Street and warehouse 53.19395°N 2.89521°W		c. 1830	The house and warehouse are built in brick on a stone plinth with Welsh slate roofs. They are in two storeys. The house has a symmetrical front with canted corners. The round-arched doorway has stone quoins and lintels. The windows are sashes, and at the top of the house is a parapet. The warehouse is to the right. A cast iron corner post and railings are included in the listing.
14–32 Egerton Street; 53.19435°N 2.88409°W		c. 1830	A terrace of ten brick cottages with a Welsh slate roof. They are in two storeys, and each cottage has a single bay. The doorways are round-arched with pilasters and fanlights, and the windows are sashes.
Bridge lock 53.19332°N 2.89972°W		Early to mid-19th century	A broad lock between Chester Basin on the Shropshire Union Canal and the link to the River Dee. It is built in sandstone and brick, and has two pairs of timber and steel lock gates. The lock is crossed by South View Road.
Graving lock 53.19451°N 2.90002°W		Early to mid-19th century	A broad lock to convey Mersey flats between Chester Basin on the Shropshire Union Canal and the link to the River Dee. It is built in sandstone and brick, has two pairs of timber lock gates, and is crossed by a footbridge.
1 Albert Street; 53.19532°N 2.88372°W	—	c. 1835	A small town house in late Georgian style. It is built in brick on a stone plinth with a slate roof, and is in two storeys. There is a central doorway with pilasters, a frieze, a cornice. and a fanlight. This is flanked by sash windows, and there are also two sash windows in the upper floor.
112, 114, 116 and 118 Brook Street; 53.19669°N 2.88362°W	—	1830s	A terrace of four houses, No. 112 later converted into the wing of a hotel. They are in brick on a stone plinth with a slate roof. The houses have three storeys, and each is in one bay. Nos. 114, 116 and 118 have steps leading up to doorways containing doorcases with fluted pilasters, friezes, pediments and fanlights. The windows are sashes under wedge lintels.
120, 122 and 124 Brook Street; 53.19685°N 2.88335°W	—	1830s	A terrace of three brick houses on a stone plinth with a slate roof. The houses have two storeys, and each is in one bay. They have simple round-arched doorways with fanlights. The windows are sashes under wedge lintels.
Chester College (Old Building); 53.19903°N 2.89678°W		1841–42	This was the first Church of England diocesan college for training schoolteachers, and was designed by J. C. and G. Buckler in Tudor Revival style. It is constructed in brick with stone dressings and has Welsh slate roofs. The college is in three storeys with a basement. The original entrance from Parkgate Road is E-shaped with three gables and mullioned windows. The college later became part of the University of Chester. Associated walls are included in the listing.
1 Derby Place, 37 Hoole Road; 53.19975°N 2.87770°W	—	1840s	A pair of brick houses on a corner site with slate roofs in two storeys. They are in two storeys, and each house has a three-bay front and a central stone doorway. No. 37 Hoole Road has a round-arched doorcase with pilasters, a projecting keystone and a cornice hood. No. 1 Derby Place has a simple doorcase with pilasters and a fanlight. The windows are sashes.
51 and 53 Hoole Road; 53.20018°N 2.87646°W	—	c. 1850	A pair of brick houses with stone dressings and a slate roof in late Georgian style. They are in two storeys and each house has two bays. The doorway to No. 51 has a cornice hood and a fanlight; the doorway to No. 53 has been bricked up and an entrance added on the left side. The windows are sashes.
13, 15 and 17 Hamilton Street; 53.19993°N 2.87418°W	—	Mid-19th century	A group of three brick houses with a hipped slate roof in two storeys. Two of the houses face Hamilton Street, and the other house has its entry on the right side. The doorcases are simple, and the windows are sashes; No. 15 also has a bay window. At the top of the houses is a moulded cornice.
19 and 21 Hamilton Street; 53.19977°N 2.87415°W	—	Mid-19th century	A pair of three brick houses with a hipped slate roof in two storeys. The doorways are in the centre with pairs of pilasters between them and flanking them. Above the doorways are fanlights, and the windows are sashes.
23 and 25 Hamilton Street; 53.19961°N 2.87409°W	—	Mid-19th century	A pair of three brick houses with a hipped slate roof in two storeys. The doorways are in the centre with pairs of pilasters between them and flanking them. Above the doorways are fanlights. The windows are sashes, those in the lower storey having cornice lintels.
27 and 29 Hamilton Street; 53.19946°N 2.87402°W	—	Mid-19th century	A pair of three brick houses with a hipped slate roof in two storeys. The doorways are in the centre with pairs of pilasters between them and flanking them. Above the doorways are fanlights, a frieze and a dentil cornice. No. 29 has an inserted bay window. The other windows are sashes, that in the lower storey having a cornice lintel.
41 and 43 Hamilton Street; 53.19880°N 2.87373°W	—	Mid-19th century	A pair of brick houses with stone dressings and a hipped slate roof in two storeys. Each house has three bays, the central bay projecting forward containing a doorway and topped by a pediment. The round-headed doorways have rusticated surrounds and a fanlight. At the corners of the houses and flanking the central bays are quoins. The windows are sashes with wedge lintels.
Taylor's Boatyard; 53.19519°N 2.90038°W		Mid-19th century	The boatyard was built alongside the Shropshire Union Canal near its junction with the River Dee by the canal and railway company, and has been altered and extended since. The listing includes the former flat shed, the narrowboat shed, the steam saw mill, the blacksmith's forge, the carpenter's shed, the paint shed, stores, a range containing a warehouse and office, and a dry dock.
Almshouses of Hospital of St John Baptist; 53.19411°N 2.89433°W		1854	A group of 14 almshouses rebuilt on the site of earlier almshouses, arranged in a U-shape around a courtyard behind the Bluecoat School. They are built in brick with stone dressings and have a hipped slate roof, and are in two storeys. There are paired entrances having Tuscan doorcases with side and central pilasters, friezes, and cornices. The windows are sashes. At the top of the building is a cornice, and a brick parapet with stone coping.
24 and 26 George Street; 53.19428°N 2.88961°W	—	1855	A pair of small brick town houses with a slate roof, in late Georgian style. They are in two storeys. The doorways have pilasters, a frieze, and a cornice hood. The windows are sashes with wedge lintels.
3 and 5 Derby Place; 53.19953°N 2.87748°W	—	1850s	A pair of brick houses with hipped slate roofs in late Georgian style. They are in two storeys, and each house has a three-bay front. Steps lead up to the central doorways that have pilasters and entablatures. The windows are sashes with wedge lintels.
4 and 6 Derby Place; 53.19964°N 2.87720°W	—	1850s	A pair of brick houses with slate roofs. They are in two storeys, and each house has a three-bay front. Steps lead up to the central doorways that have pilasters, friezes, cornice hoods, and fanlights. The windows are sashes with wedge lintels.
7, 9 and 11 Derby Place; 53.19931°N 2.87728°W	—	1850s	A terrace of three brick houses with a Welsh slate roof. They are in two storeys, and each house has a two-bay front. Steps lead up to the central doorways that have pilasters, entablatures, cornice hoods, and fanlights. The windows are sashes with wedge lintels.
Queen Hotel; 53.19620°N 2.88030°W		1860	The hotel was designed by T. M. Penson. It was damaged by fire in 1861 and rebuilt the following year to the same design by Penson and Cornelius Sherlock. The hotel is built in brick, some of it stuccoed, with a slate roof, and is in Italianate style. It is mainly in four storeys and a basement, with eleven bays on the Station Road front, eight on the City road front, and a rounded bay between them. There is also a lower ten-bay wing on City road. The listing includes the former stable wing and railings in front of the hotel.
Town Crier public house 53.19636°N 2.88071°W		1865	This was built originally as a hotel, and used later as a public house. It is built in brick, some of it stuccoed, and is in Italianate style. The public house has two storeys and a basement, with ten bays on the Station Road front, four on the City road front, and three on the rounded section between them. The windows are sashes, those in the ground floor having segmental heads separated by Doric pilasters, and those in the upper floor having straight heads. The wall and railings in front of the building are included in the listing.
Westminster Road School; 53.19820°N 2.87403°W		1865–67	Originally a primary school with an attached schoolhouse designed by John Douglas for the 2nd Marquess of Westminster, it has been closed and converted into other uses. The building is in brick with slate roofs. The school has a central hall and smaller rooms. The schoolhouse is in two storeys with a symmetrical front, and has two hipped dormers with lead finials.
All Saints' Church, Hoole; 53.20132°N 2.87278°W	—	1867	The church was designed by S. W. Dawkes, and a vestry was added in 1911. The south side of the church was rebuilt in 1912; this was designed by John Douglas with F. Walley. The interior was reordered in the 20th century. The church is built in sandstone with slate roofs, and consists of a nave, aisles, a chancel, a vestry, a north porch with a gable, and a southwest tower with a broach spire.
Churchyard walls and gates, All Saints' Church, Hoole; 53.20132°N 2.87278°W	—	1867	The wall, gate piers and intermediate piers are in sandstone, and extend along Hoole Road and Vicarage Road. The decorative gates and overthrow, which is surmounted by a cross, are in wrought iron. The railings were removed in the Second World War.
St Thomas of Canterbury Church; 53.19838°N 2.89640°W		1869–72	The church was designed by George Gilbert Scott, and completed in 1881 by John Oldrid Scott. It is built in sandstone with slate roofs, and is in the architectural style of the 13th century. The church consists of a nave, aisles, a chancel with a north chapel, and a tower at the southeast corner. On the southwest corner of the tower is a turret with a timber-framed upper stage topped by a pyramidal copper roof.
Abbey Gate School; 53.19636°N 2.89334°W	—	1870	The former school was designed by T. M. Lockwood in Vernacular Revival style. It is constructed in brick with diapering, it has slate roofs, and it is in two storeys. There were repeated extensions between 1877 and 1905. Features include gables, some with applied half-timbering and decorative bargeboards, a brick bellcote, Venetian windows, and multipaned casement windows. The building closed as a school in 1973.
Northgate Church; 53.19580°N 2.89454°W		1874	This was built as a Congregational church, and was designed by T. M. Lockwood. Its front is constructed in sandstone, with the rest in brick, and it has a slate roof. The church is in Early English style, with lancet windows. It has a three-stage tower, broaching to a belfry stage, which is surmounted by a spire with a weathervane.
Churchyard walls and gates, St Thomas of Canterbury Church; 53.19859°N 2.89655°W	—	Late 19th century	The walls and gate piers are in sandstone, and the gates are in cast iron. The wall is on the northwest side of the churchyard and contains a pair of panelled gate piers with pyramidal heads. Between them is a pair of gates, and there are similar gates, but without piers, opposite the north porch.
Churchyard walls and gates, St Thomas of Canterbury Church; 53.19842°N 2.89590°W	—	Late 19th century	The walls and gate piers are in sandstone, and the gates are in cast iron. The wall is on the northeast side of the churchyard and contains a pair of panelled gate piers with pyramidal heads. It continues to the southwest, and contains another pair of gate piers and a set of gates.
St Barnabas' Church and curate's house 53.19667°N 2.88281°W		1877	A redundant church with attached curate's house, designed by John Douglas. Both are in brick with slate roofs, and the house has a timber-framed upper storey. The church consists of a nave and chancel with north transept, a vestry and a baptistry. On the roof is a flèche surmounted by ball and cross.
Vicarage, St Thomas of Canterbury Church; 53.19797°N 2.89625°W	—	1880	The vicarage was designed by John Douglas, and used later by the University of Chester. It is built in brick with plaster panels, and has a slate roof. It is in two storeys with an attic, and has an attached single-storey former parish room. On the left of the entrance front is a two-storey porch containing a chapel in the upper floor, a recessed central section, and a protruding right gable with a square stair turret in the angle. On the rear (garden) front is a two-storey canted bay window.
3 Upper Northgate Street; 53.19434°N 2.89371°W	—	1886	A house designed by T. M. Lockwood, built in red brick with terracotta and stone dressings and a Westmorland slate roof. It stands on a prominent street corner, and is in two storeys with an attic. The doorway has pilasters, a scrolled pediment on a console and a fanlight. The windows have variously shaped heads, and other features include a large canted oriel window, and gables.
Downswood; 53.20456°N 2.89696°W		1887–88	A detached house, later used as a school, in Vernacular Revival style. It is built in Ruabon brick with dressings in stone and terracotta and a tiled roof. The building is in two storeys with attics, and has a four-bay entrance front. Its features include mullioned and transomed windows, shaped gables with finials, decorative terracotta panels, and bay windows.
Bull and Stirrup Hotel; 53.19435°N 2.89333°W		1889	The hotel was designed by W. M. Boden. It is built in Ruabon brick, with dressings in terracotta and stone, and has a Westmorland slate roof. The hotel stands on a corner site, is in three storeys, has four bays on both fronts, and a bay with a turret on the corner. Other features include oriel windows, some with balconies, a shaped gable, and curved pediments with ball finials.
Christ Church; 53.19686°N 2.88851°W		1893	The church was designed by John Douglas and built in stages, the first part being the chancel followed by a chapel in 1897, the nave in 1900, the baptistry in 1904, and a porch in 1936. A southwest steeple was planned but was never built. It is constructed in sandstone with slate roofs. Over the porch is a cantilevered timber-framed hipped bellcote.
Milepost, Liverpool Road; 53.20458°N 2.89420°W		c. 1900	The milepost is in cast iron and consists of an octagonal post on a plinth 2 metres (6.6 ft) high. It carries a plate inscribed "CHESTER CROSS 1 MILE".
Milepost, Parkgate Road; 53.20365°N 2.90064°W		c. 1900	The milepost is in cast iron and consists of an octagonal post on a plinth 2 metres (6.6 ft) high. It carries a plate inscribed "CHESTER CROSS 1 MILE".
Milepost, Saughall Road; 53.20035°N 2.90470°W		c. 1900	The milepost is in cast iron and consists of an octagonal post on a plinth 2 metres (6.6 ft) high. It carries a plate inscribed "CHESTER CROSS 1 MILE".
Milepost, Sealand Road; 53.19563°N 2.91032°W		c. 1900	The milepost is in cast iron and consists of an octagonal post on a plinth 2 metres (6.6 ft) high. It carries a plate inscribed "CHESTER CROSS 1 MILE".
Northgate Bakery; 53.19421°N 2.89292°W	—	c. 1905	Originally a bakery, later used for other purposes, it consists of a long central block in two storeys, with taller lateral wings in two and three storeys. The building is in brick, partly stuccoed, and has slate roofs. Along the ground floor are modern shop fronts, doorways and, in the west wing, a circular window. The east wing has a timber-framed upper floor with a gable and mullioned and transomed windows. The stuccoed upper floor of the central section has five circular windows in cartouches. The upper floors of the west wing contain panels, one inscribed, sash windows, and a pediment gable containing a circular window.
Egerton Street School; 53.19516°N 2.88402°W		1909–10	A primary school designed by John Douglas and W. T. Lockwood, and used later as a nursery. It is built in red brick with yellow terracotta dressings and a tiled roof. The building is in one and two storeys, and its features include shaped gables with ball finials, sash windows, a circular window, and a timber belfry in a small timber-framed gable. A playground shelter and railings around the grounds are included in the listing.
Catholic Club; 53.19440°N 2.88653°W		1913–14	Originally a hotel, then a public house, and later the parish centre for St Werburgh's Church. It was designed by John Davies and Sons, and is built in brick, sandstone and timber-framing with pebbledashed panels, and has a Westmorland slate roof. The club is in Vernacular Revival style, is in two storeys, and has two wings at right angles. Its features include a Roman Doric porch, tall chimneys with lozenge flues, a jettied upper storey with mullioned casement windows and oriel windows, and a balcony at the rear.
War memorial cross 53.19859°N 2.89616°W	—	c. 1920	The war memorial cross is in the churchyard of St Thomas of Canterbury Church. It is in sandstone, and consists of a Calvary cross with a sculpture of the Crucifixion with Jesus under a hood. It is about 2 metres (6 ft 7 in) high, and has a rectangular shaft with a carved inscription at the bottom. On the rear of the shaft is a carving in relief of the Virgin Mary holding baby Jesus. The cross stands on a rectangular plinth on two rectangular steps. On the plinth is an inscription relating to both World Wars.
George and Dragon public house 53.19678°N 2.89459°W		1929–30	The public house stands prominently on a road junction, and is in Vernacular Revival style. The ground floor is in brick with sandstone dressings, and the upper parts are timber-framed. Its features include mullioned and transomed windows, oriel windows, jettied gables with decorative bargeboards and drop finials, a gabled porch with a balcony above, and a Tudor arched doorway. The post and frame for an inn sign are included in the listing.

== See also ==
- Grade I listed buildings in Cheshire West and Chester
- Grade II* listed buildings in Cheshire West and Chester
- Grade II listed buildings in Chester (central)
- Grade II listed buildings in Chester (east)
- Grade II listed buildings in Chester (south)
