= Christ Church, Chester =

Coordinates: 53.1969°N 2.8885°W

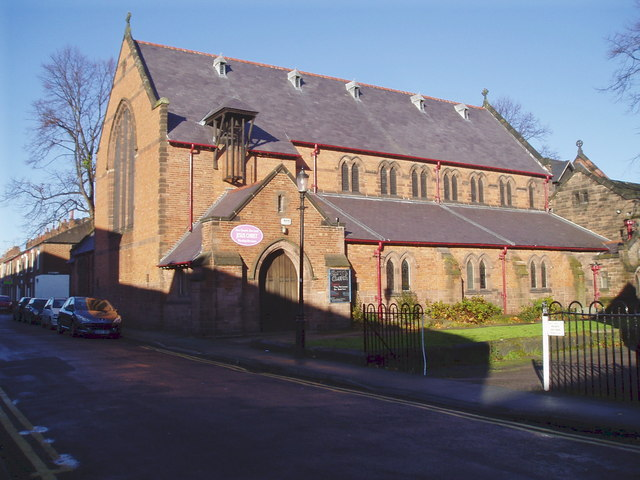

- Location in Cheshire
- OS grid reference: SJ 407,670
- Location: Somerset Street, Chester, Cheshire
- Country: England
- Denomination: Church of England
- Churchmanship: Evangelical
- Website: Christ Church

History
- Status: Parish church

Architecture
- Functional status: Active
- Heritage designation: Grade II
- Designated: 23 July 1998
- Architect: John Douglas
- Architectural type: Church
- Style: Gothic Revival
- Groundbreaking: 1876
- Completed: 1900

Specifications
- Materials: Sandstone and red brick Grey-green slate roofs

Administration
- Diocese: Diocese of Chester
- Archdeaconry: Chester archdeaconry
- Deanery: Chester deanery
- Parish: Chester, Christ Church

Clergy
- Vicar: Graham Shaw

Christ Church is a Church of England parish church in Somerset Street, Chester, Cheshire, England. It is in the Archdeaconry of Chester and the Deanery of Chester. Its benefice is combined with that of St Michael, Plas Newton. It is a Grade II listed building.

== History ==
The church was built to replace an earlier church dated 1838 on the site which had been designed by Thomas Jones. It was rebuilt in separate stages by John Douglas. The chancel dates from 1893, the southeast chapel from 1897, the nave was completed in 1900, and the northwest baptistry was added in 1904. A southwest steeple was planned but was never built. The porch was built in 1936, in place of the planned steeple.

== Architecture ==
=== Exterior ===
The chancel and the southeast chapel are built of sandstone ashlar and the rest of the church is in red brick with stone dressings. The roofs are of grey-green slates. The style is Gothic Revival. The plan of the church consists of a five-bay nave with a clerestory, north and south aisles, a chancel, a baptistry, a southeast chapel, vestries, and a south porch. Over the porch is a cantilevered timber-framed hip-roofed bellcote. The gables have crosses as finials and the nave roof has five blocked lucarnes on each slope.

=== Interior ===
Sir Charles Nicholson designed the gilded reredos, the organ case, and the side screen, between 1900 and 1910, and the rood beam in 1920, and also possibly the gates to the chapel. The reredos in the chapel, dating from 1897, was designed by Kempe, its figures being carved by Joseph Mayer of Oberammergau. The paintings of 1910 on the organ screen are by Gertrude Siddall. Robert Hilton designed the bishop's chair and a prayer board. There are two fonts, one probably dating from 1837, octagonal and in stone, and another dating from 1904 in alabaster. The churchwardens' settles date from 1837, and were formerly in St Mary's Church, Eccleston.

Also in the church is a painting depicting Christ prepared for the Entombment by Westall, dated 1826, and which was an altarpiece in Eccleston church. There is a painting of Mary Magdalene, startled in a wood, by Herbert Gustave Schmalz. Much of the stained glass is by Kempe, including that in the southeast chapel of 1897, the south aisle of 1901, the west window of 1902, and outside the baptistry. Above the older font is a window by A. Hilton dated 1906, depicting an angel. The baptistry glass also dates from 1906 and is by A. K. Nicholson. The memorials dating from between about 1895 to 1917 consist of small alabaster plaques. The two-manual organ was built by Brindley & Foster of Sheffield. Organ is due for a refurbishment in the next 5 years.

From 2015, Church was fitted with a glass door to replace wooden doors to allow more light in. Stage at front was brought forward. In 2019, Stage Four renewed space project to add an extension on to Vestry and community rooms for Children Work and local homeless community of Chester started in 2019. Work to be completed in the next 5 years to the cost of £1 million.

== See also ==
- Grade II listed buildings in Chester (north and west)
- List of new churches by John Douglas
