= Edward Barber (priest) =

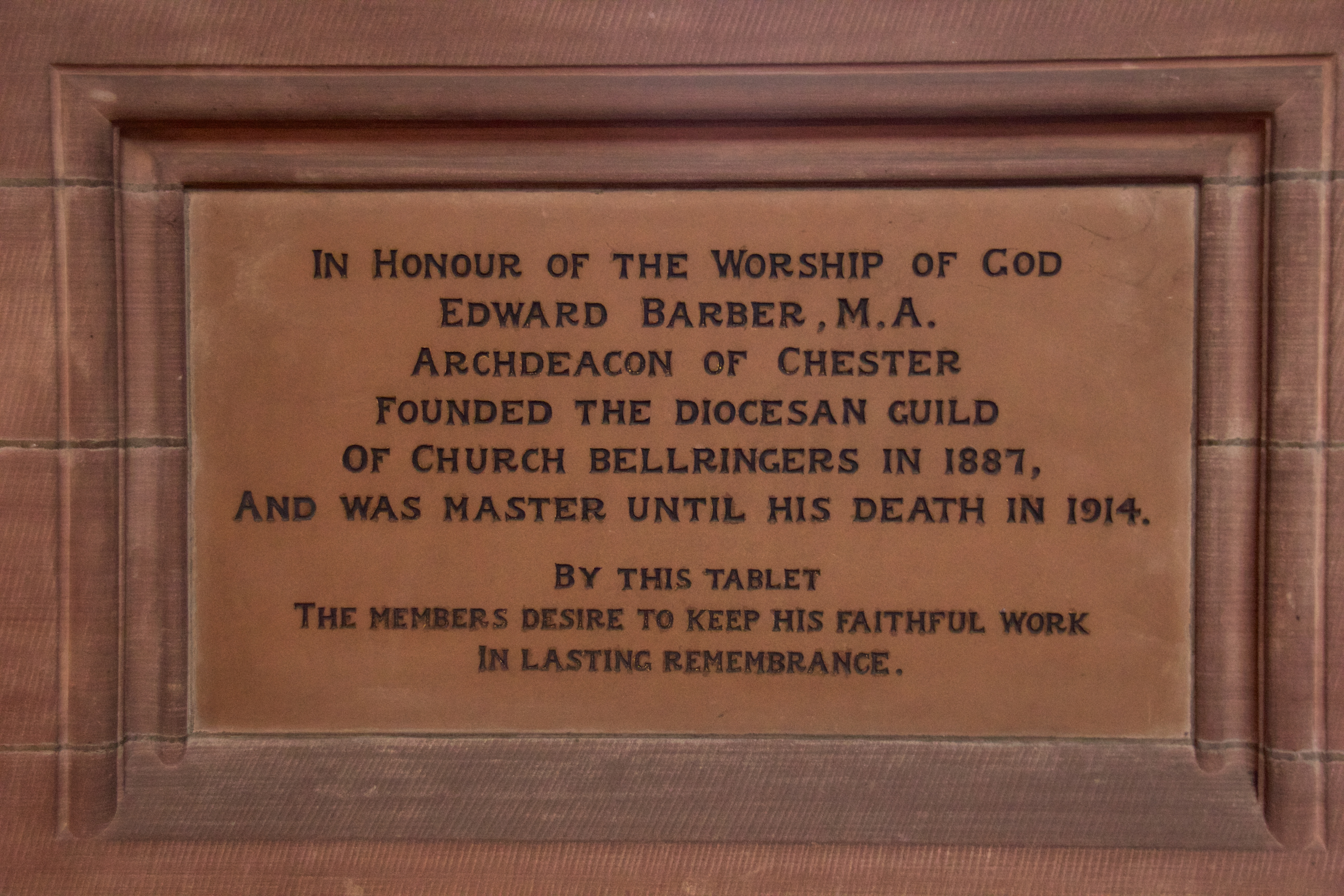
Memorial to Edward Barber in Chester Cathedral

Edward Barber (born Brighouse, 19 September 1841 – died Chester, 23 July 1914) was Archdeacon of Chester from 1886 until his death.

Born into an ecclesiastical family, Barber was educated at St Peter's School, York, and Magdalen College, Oxford. Ordained in 1865, he was an Assistant Master at St Peter's College, Radley, then an Inspector of Schools in the Diocese of Oxford from 1872 and 1983; Rector of Chalfont St Giles from 1883 to 1986; and a Canon Residentiary of Chester Cathedral from then on.

Church of England titles
Preceded by John Lionel Darby	Archdeacon of Chester; 1886–1914	Succeeded by William Lang Paige Cox
