= Abel Ward =

English archdeacon

Abel Ward was Archdeacon of Chester from his installation on 20 April 1751 until his death on 1 October 1785.

Ward was born in Staffordshire. He was admitted Sizar at Queens' College, Cambridge on 12 October 1736. He was a Fellow of his college until 1744 when he was incorporated at Oxford. He was Rector of St Ann's Church, Manchester from 1745 until 1758; and then of St Mary's Church, Dodleston until his death on 9 October 1785.

Church of England titles
Preceded by William Powell	Archdeacon of Chester; 1751–1785	Succeeded by George Taylor
