= Hewetson =

Hewetson is a surname. Notable people with the surname include:

- Al Hewetson (1946–2004), Scottish-Canadian writer
- Christopher Hewetson, Irish sculptor
- Christopher Hewetson (priest), English priest
- Edward Hewetson, English cricketer
- James Hewetson, Texas empresario
- John Hewetson, British anarchist and physician
- Sir Reginald Hewetson, military general
