= Bellott =

Bellott is a surname. Notable people with the surname include:

- Cuthbert Bellott, English Anglican priest
- Renatus Bellott (died 1709), English politician
