= John Thane =

John Thane may refer to:

- John Thane (priest) (died 1727), English churchman
- John Thane (dealer) (1748–1818), art expert and engraver

== See also ==
- John Thain, American financial executive
