= Michael Gilbertson =

Michael Gilbertson may refer to:

- Michael Gilbertson (priest)
- Michael Gilbertson (composer)
