= The Town Crier, Chester =

Pub in Chester, England

Coordinates: 53.19641°N 2.88079°W

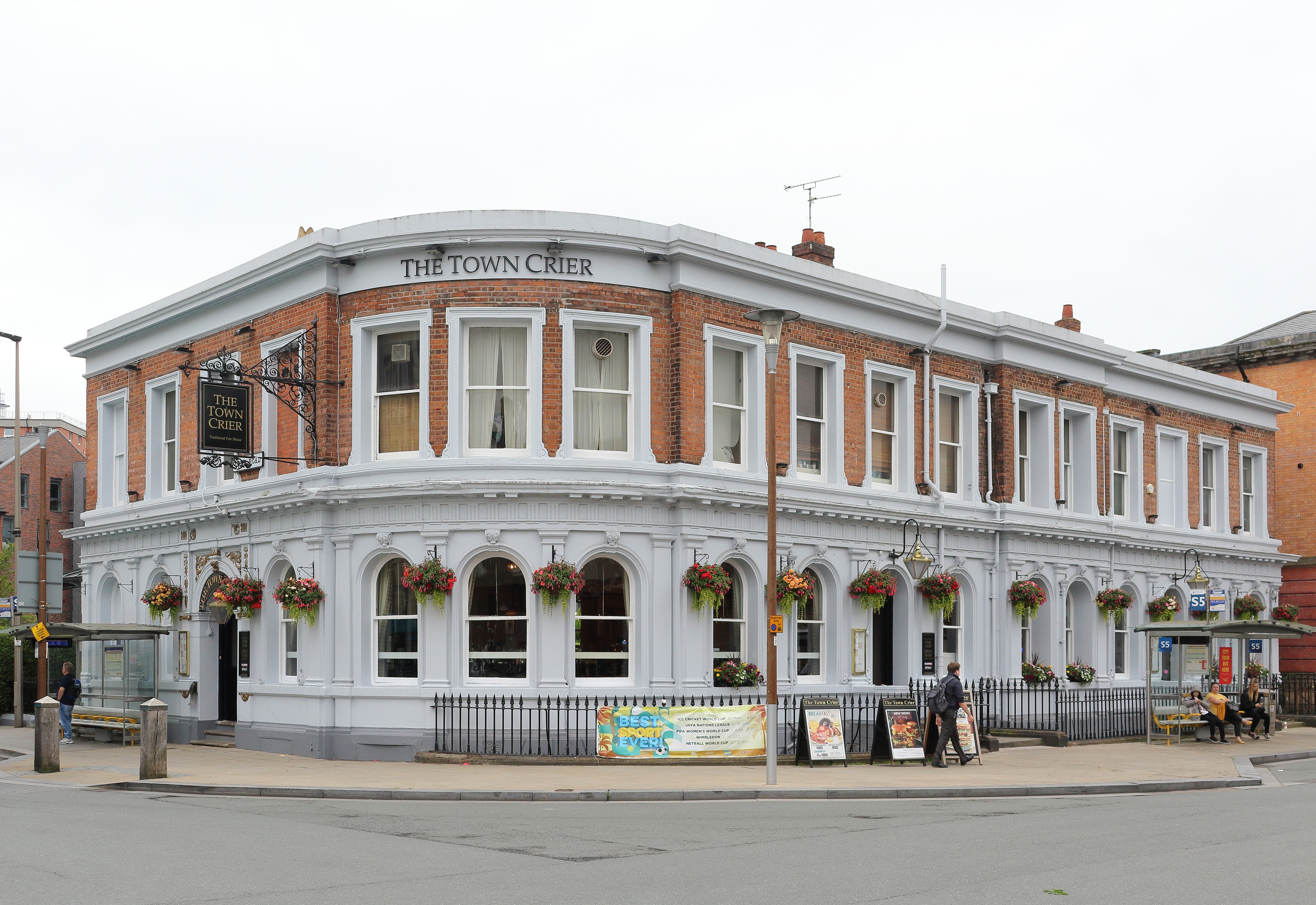
The Town Crier

The Town Crier is a public house located on the corner of City Road and Station Road, Chester, Cheshire, England. It stands opposite Chester General Station. It is recorded in the National Heritage List for England as a designated Grade II listed building.

== History ==
The Town Crier was built in 1865 as a hotel. Its original name was either the Queen Commercial Hotel, or the Albion Hotel. On the opposite corner was the Queen Hotel, which was intended to serve the first-class railway passengers; the Town Crier was for the rest. The two hotels were linked by an underground passage. This building has subsequently been used as a public house.

== Architecture ==
The building is constructed in brick and render and is in Italianate style. It has two storeys and a basement, with ten windows on the Station Road side, three on the quadrant corner, and four on the side facing City Road. The windows in the ground floor have segmental heads, and are separated by Doric pilasters; those in the upper floor have straight heads. All the windows are sashes.

== See also ==
- Grade II listed buildings in Chester (north and west)
