= Edmund Entwisle =

The Venerable Edmund Entwisle, D.D. (28 April 1660 – 15 September 1707) was an Anglican clergyman.

Entwisle was born at Ormskirk. He was educated at Brasenose College, Oxford. He became the rector of Barrow in 1691. He was also chaplain to Bishop Thomas Stratford, bishop of Chester and a canon of Chester Cathedral|. He was appointed archdeacon of Chester from 1695 until his death. He died in Chester.
