= Frank Bennett (scholar) =

Frank Selwyn Macaulay Bennett (28 October 1866 – 14 November 1947) was an Anglican cleric and scholar. He was a reforming dean of Chester in the first half of the 20th century.

He was born in Torquay, Devon, the son of Henry Edward Bennett of Sparkford Hall, Somerset, and the Canadian-born Louisa Birchall Macaulay, daughter of Sir James Buchanan Macaulay, Chief Justice of Toronto. He was educated at Sherborne and Keble College, Oxford. He was private chaplain to Bishop Jayne of Chester and then held incumbencies at Portwood and Hawarden before his elevation to the deanery. He was eulogised as the man who made Chester Cathedral "the home of the Diocese".

== Bibliography ==
- Bennett, F. S. M. (1895). The public-house under popular control. OCLC 1436091247.
- ———; Frere, Walter Howard (1925). The Nature of a cathedral. Chester: Phillipson and Golder. OCLC 458418160.
- ——— (1925). The nature of a cathedral. Chester: Phillipson and Golder. OCLC 5015177.
- ——— (1926). A soul in the making: or, psycho-synthesis. Chester [England], London: Phillipson and Golder; Simpkin, Marshall & Co. OCLC 4539374.
- ——— (1926). Expecto : an essay towards a biology of the world to come. Chester [Cheshire, England]: Phillipson and Golder. OCLC 13847853.
- ——— (1926). M. Coué and his gospel of health. Chester [England]: Phillipson and Golder. OCLC 11807102.
- ——— (1927). Mary Jane and Harry John : or, Home the premier school. London: Mowbray. OCLC 1274781209.
- ——— (1930). The resurrection of the organism. Chester: Phillipson & Golder. OCLC 222313728.
- ——— (1930). The Christian ideal of health. OCLC 315947652.
- ——— (1930). A little handbook for pilgrims to Chester Cathedral. Chester: Phillipson and Golder. OCLC 78684284.
- ——— (1937). Chester Cathedral. Chester: Phillipson & Golder. OCLC 774441232.
- ——— (1938). This Moment of Opportunity for Religious Education, etc. S.P.C.K.: London. OCLC 556709067.
- ——— (1946). Laodicea in the twentieth century or the Church of England in the England of today. London: Society for Promoting Christian Knowledge. OCLC 31335648.
- ——— (1969). The resurrection of the dead. London: Chapman & Hall. OCLC 854197025.

Church of England titles
Preceded by John Lionel Darby	Dean of Chester; 1920 – 1937	Succeeded by Norman Henry Tubbs
