= John Allen (archdeacon of Chester) =

John Allen was an Anglican priest.

Thane was educated at Trinity College, Cambridge. He was Archdeacon of Chester from 12 April 1686 until his death on 17 April 1695. He was also Chaplain to Bishop Thomas Pearson.
