= William Powell (Archdeacon of Chester) =

British priest

William Powell (circa 1681 - 13 April 1751) was an eighteenth century British Anglican priest.

Powell was born around 1681 at Hampton Court. He received his education at Eton and St John's College, Cambridge He held livings at Lambourn, Langwmdinmael and Llanyblodwel. He served as the Dean of St Asaph from 1731 until his death in 1751, and as the Archdeacon of Chester from his installation on 22 April 1747 until his death on 13 April 1751.

Church of England titles
Preceded by William Stanley	Dean of St Asaph; 1731–1751	Succeeded by William Herring
Preceded by William Powell	Archdeacon of Chester; 1747–1751	Succeeded by George Taylor
