= William Pollock (priest) =

William Pollock (22 April 1812 in Dublin – 11 October 1873 in Chester) was Archdeacon of Chester from 1867 until 1871.

Pollock was educated at Trinity College, Dublin. After a curacy at St Thomas, Stockport he held incumbencies in Macclesfield, St Helens, Liverpool and Bowdon. He was Chaplain of St Patrick's Newry 1837 and was collated as Archdeacon of Chester December 14th 1867. He resigned that office through failing health October 12th 1871.

He had eight children, and his eldest, his daughter Anna, married William Thompson Hill, an East India merchant, and was mother to the Rev. William Pollock-Hill M.A. Oxen, Vicar of Padgate, Bigbury and Stamford, the famous Victorian athlete and UK record holder for the 1 mile, and won the 1 mile and 3 mile on the same day in March 1895 at Queen's Club meeting v Cambridge, a record never equalled. His eighth child Rev Richard Charles Pollock was an eminent Anglican clergyman in Australasia.

Church of England titles
Preceded by Richard Greenall	Archdeacon of Chester; 1867–1871	Succeeded by Edward Ralph Johnson
