= Leslie Williams (archdeacon of Chester) =

British priest (1919–2013)

Henry Leslie Williams (26 December 1919 – 2013) was Archdeacon of Chester from 1975 to 1988.

Williams was educated at St David's College, Lampeter and ordained in 1944 following a period of study at St. Michael's College, Llandaff. After curacies in Aberdyfi, Bangor and Chester he was Vicar of Barnston from 1953 to 1984. He was also a Chaplain in the Territorial Army from 1953 to 1962; Rural Dean of Wirral North from 1967 to 1975; an Honorary Canon of Chester Cathedral from 1972 to 1975; and a Member of the General Synod from 1978 to 1988.

== Notes ==
Church of England titles
Preceded by Leslie Gravatt Fisher	Archdeacon of Chester; 1975–1988	Succeeded by Michael Frederick Gear
