= St Mary's Church, Mold =

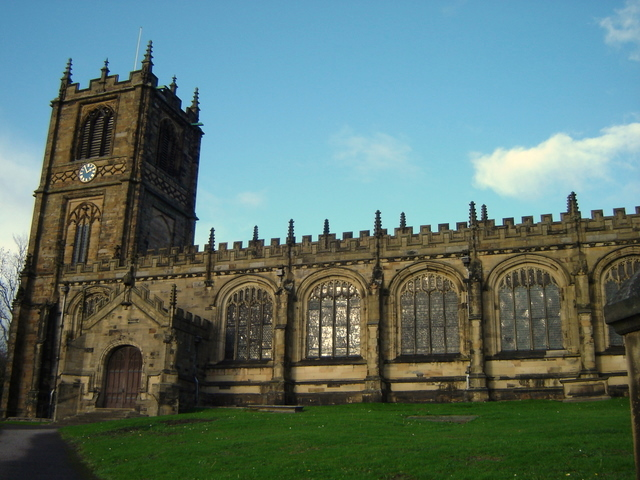
- St Mary's Church, Mold, from the south
- St Mary's Church, Mold
- 53.1691°N 3.1430°W
- Location: High Street, Mold, Flintshire
- Country: Wales
- Denomination: Anglican
- Churchmanship: Anglo-Catholic

History
- Status: Parish church
- Dedication: St Mary the Virgin

Architecture
- Functional status: Active
- Heritage designation: Grade I
- Designated: 21 June 1953
- Architect(s): Joseph Turner (tower); Sir George Gilbert Scott; Prothero, Phillott and Barnard
- Architectural type: Church
- Style: Perpendicular
- Groundbreaking: c. 1490

Specifications
- Materials: Sandstone with lead roofs

Administration
- Province: Church in Wales
- Diocese: St Asaph
- Archdeaconry: Wrexham
- Deanery: Mold
- Parish: Mold

Clergy
- Vicar: The Rev'd Canon Martin Bachelor

St Mary's Church is an Anglican parish church in Mold, Flintshire, Wales, and a Grade I listed building. It belongs to the Deanery of Mold, the Archdeaconry of Wrexham and the Diocese of St Asaph of the Church in Wales. It has historical associations with the Stanley family, Earls of Derby and displays heraldic symbols of this, including an Eagle and Child assumed by the family in the 15th century, and the Three Legs of Man, derived from a time when the Stanleys were Lords of Mann. Under Father Rex Matthias, the previous incumbent, the church took on an Anglo-Catholic style of liturgy.

== History ==
St Mary's Church (grid reference SJ236641) stands on the site of a Norman church, which fell into disrepair in the 14th century. This was replaced by a larger one in the 15th century, which in turn deteriorated. It was demolished except for its tower. Construction of the present church began about 1490. The first patron of this was Lady Margaret Beaufort, Countess of Richmond and Derby and mother of Henry VII. She died in 1509, but the nave and aisles were not complete until about 1550. After the Reformation, two Bishops of St Asaph made financial contributions: Robert Wharton and William Hughes. About this time the rectory of Mold passed to Bisham Priory, which was to be responsible for building a chancel, but this never occurred. The completed chancel arch was instead blocked up and a seven-light window inserted. In 1674 a clock was bought and the roof was re-leaded, in 1678 and 1733 new bells were added, in 1729 restoration work took place, and a gallery was added in 1751–1752. The west tower was replaced in 1768–1773 to a design by the architect Joseph Turner. Hubbard comments that despite its proportions it is "a creditable 18th-century attempt" at reproducing Perpendicular architecture. It is possible that the clerestory was added at this time.

A major restoration carried out in 1853–1856 by Sir George Gilbert Scott involved adding a chancel with a three-sided apse. The west gallery was removed, the pews replaced by carved benches, and a pulpit, lectern and choir stalls installed. A new roof was built over the nave, the organ was moved to the east end of the north aisle and a north porch was added. In 1885 repairs to the stonework were made. Further restoration in 1911 was supervised by the architects Prothero, Phillott and Barnard of Cheltenham. This included rebuilding the south porch. The Lady Chapel was restored in 1921 by Sir Thomas G. Jackson. Still more restoration work was carried out in the 1950s and in 1998–2001.

== Architecture ==
=== Structure ===
The main body is built in local Cefn sandstone. Most of the church is Perpendicular in style, although the inner doorway of the south porch is Elizabethan. Its plan consists of a seven-bay nave with a clerestory, a one-bay chancel with a three-sided apse, north and south aisles, a west tower, a north vestry and a south porch. There is much carving on the stonework, including processions of animals. The tower has three stages and a battlemented top with crocketed pinnacles at the corner and in the middle of each side. There are stepped corner buttresses and a clock face on the south wall. The aisles also have battlemented parapets with crocketed pinnacles at the tops of the stepped buttresses between the bays. Each bay has a four-light window under a chamfered arch.

=== Fittings and furniture ===
The font is dated 1847 and is Perpendicular in style; its cover was made from the material of an 18th-century chandelier. The alabaster reredos was designed by John Douglas and made by Hardman & Co. The pews are carved with poppyheads and the pulpit and stalls, dated 1856, were designed by Scott. The fittings in the north-east chapel were designed by Sir Thomas G. Jackson in 1921 as a war memorial, as were both organ cases, which are dated 1923.

=== Stained glass ===
The stained glass came from several designers and manufacturers, including William Wailes, Clayton and Bell, Lavers and Barraud, Alexander Booker and Burlison and Grylls. One window commemorates the painter Richard Wilson, who is buried in the churchyard. Other monuments include a brass dated 1602 and a series of cartouches dating from 1666 to 1757.

=== Organ ===
The organ was installed in 1973 by the Liverpool firm of Rushworth and Dreaper, to replace an earlier organ made by the same firm. It is a locally unusual example of an organ with baroque voicing. In place of the usual swell louvres, it features opening doors with carved hinged panels. This organ was rebuilt by Peter Collins in 2008.

=== Bells ===
The tower has a ring of eight bells, five of them cast in 1732 by Abraham Rudhall II and three added in 2005, cast by Eijsbouts.

== See also ==
- List of church restorations, amendments and furniture by John Douglas
- List of churches in Flintshire
