= William Herring =

English priest

William Herring (1718 – 1774) was an Anglican priest, most notably Dean of St Asaph from 1751 until 1774.

William was born in Norwich, and educated at Norwich School and Clare College, Cambridge. He held livings at Alburgh, Edgefield and Bolton Percy. At a time when plurality (holding multiple church jobs) was common, he was also a prebendary of York from 1744; and Precentor of Salisbury from 1754.

He was buried in Bolton Percy, Yorkshire, England, where he had been Rector since 1747, on 25 May 1774.

Church of England titles
Preceded by William Powell	Dean of St Asaph; 1751 –1774	Succeeded by William Davies Shipley
