= Bridge of Sighs, Chester =

Bridge in Chester, United Kingdom

Coordinates: 53°11′37.86″N 2°53′37.43″W

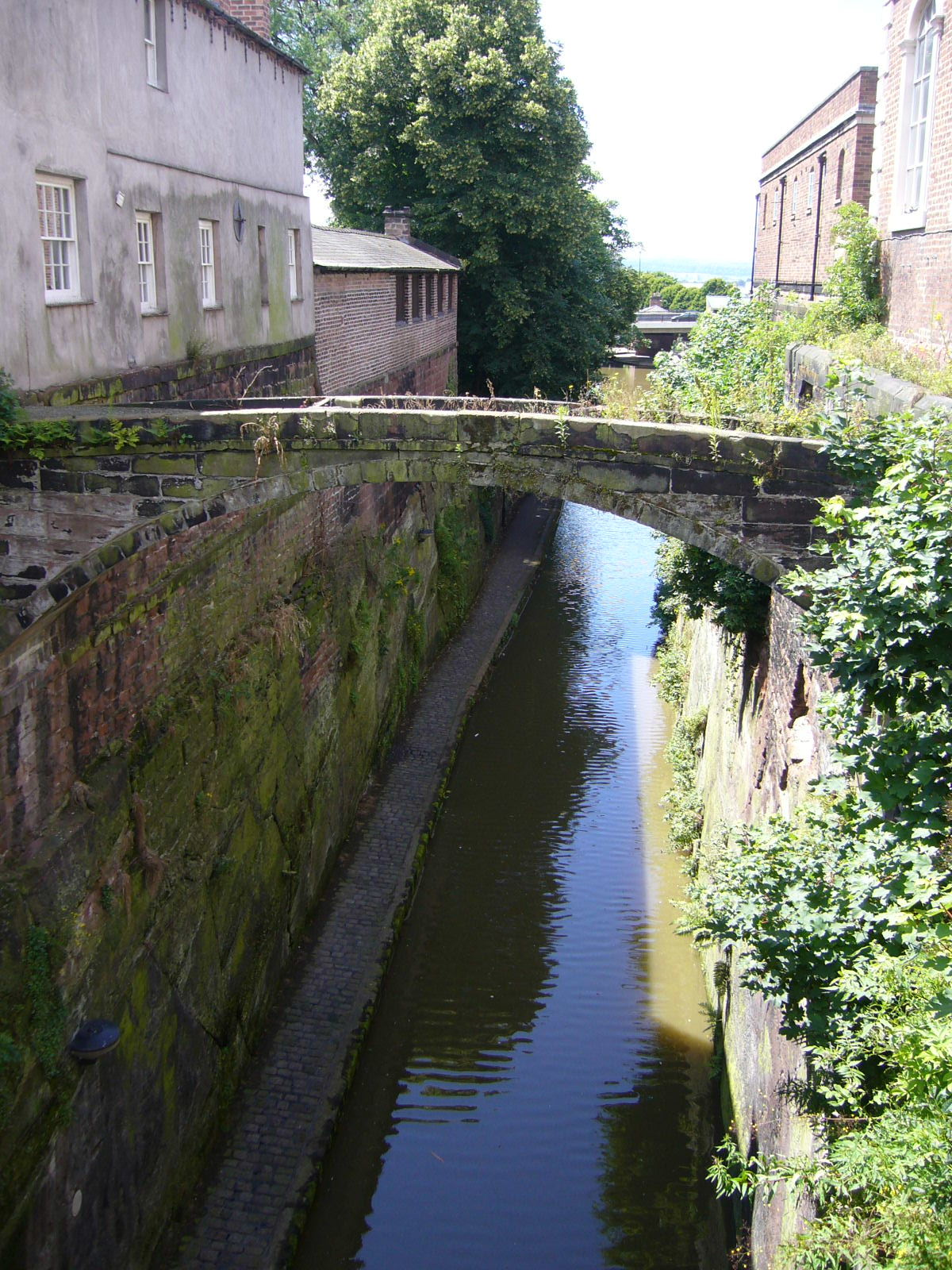
Bridge of Sighs

The Bridge of Sighs in Chester is a crossing that originally led from the Northgate jail, across the Chester Canal, to a chapel in the Bluecoat School. It is recorded in the National Heritage List for England as a designated Grade II listed building.

== History ==
The bridge was built probably in 1793. It originally had iron railings to prevent the prisoners from escaping. The railings were removed during World War II. The architect was Joseph Turner.

After the Northgate Prison closed, Chester City Corporation tried to have the bridge removed in 1821.

== See also ==
- Grade II listed buildings in Chester (north and west)
