= Leslie Fisher =

Leslie Gravatt Fisher (18 August 1906 – 16 June 1988) was an Anglican priest. He was the Archdeacon of Chester from 1965 to 1975.

Fisher was educated at Hertford Grammar School and the London College of Divinity. After a curacy in Northwood he held incumbencies at Blackheath and Bermondsey. He was then home secretary of the Church Mission Society from 1947 until his archdeacon’s appointment.

Church of England titles
Preceded by Richard Vernon Higgins Burne	Archdeacon of Chester; 1965–1975	Succeeded by Henry Leslie Williams
