= St Thomas of Canterbury Church, Chester =

Coordinates: 53.1984°N 2.8964°W

St. Thomas of Canterbury Church, Chester
- The church in 2026

- Location in Cheshire
- OS grid reference: SJ 402 672
- Location: Parkgate Road, Chester, Cheshire
- Country: England
- Denomination: Anglican
- Churchmanship: Anglo-Catholic
- Website: St Thomas, Chester

History
- Status: Parish church
- Dedication: Thomas Becket
- Consecrated: 1872

Architecture
- Functional status: Active
- Heritage designation: Grade II
- Designated: 10 January 1972
- Architect(s): George Gilbert Scott; John Oldrid Scott
- Architectural type: Church
- Style: Gothic Revival
- Completed: 1881

Specifications
- Capacity: 240
- Materials: Sandstone, Westmorland Slate, English Oak

Administration
- Province: York
- Diocese: Chester
- Archdeaconry: Chester
- Deanery: Chester
- Parish: St. Oswald and St. Thomas of Canterbury

Clergy
- Priest: Mother Anne-Marie Naylor

The Church of St. Thomas of Canterbury is an active Anglican parish church situated in the City of Chester, in an area of the city informally known as "The Garden Quarter", a densely populated area, close to the University. The church was built in 1872, but the parish of St. Oswald which it serves is much older, dating back to about 980 AD. One of the earliest references to St. Oswald's can be found in Bradshaw's. The parish registers date back to 1580. The church is recorded in the National Heritage List for England as a designated Grade II listed building. The church is part of the diocese of Chester, the archdeaconry of Chester and the deanery of Chester. The patrons of the parish are the dean and chapter of Chester Cathedral.

== History ==
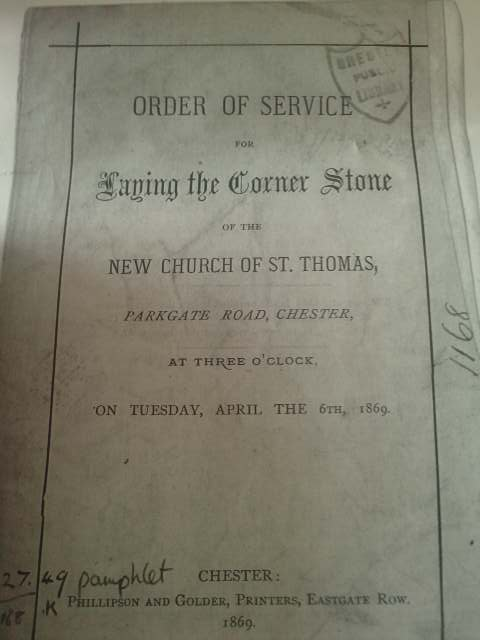
Order of Service, 6 April 1869

In 1868 the growing population of the parish led to the decision to build a chapel of ease, and land was obtained from the Dean & Chapter in Parkgate Road. The cornerstone was laid on 6 April 1869 by H.C. Raikes (MP for Chester) with the west end of the building bricked up to facilitate extension when circumstances permitted. The new chapel, dedicated to St. Thomas of Canterbury, was consecrated on 4 April 1872 by William Jacobson, Bishop of Chester. Licence for the solemnization of marriages in St Thomas' church was granted on 3 March 1877. Services there included holy communion at least once a month on Sundays and on saints' days, as well as morning and evening prayer. In 1880 the parishioners responded to the suggestion of the Dean and Chapter, first made in 1868, and agreed to surrender their rights in the south transept of the cathedral and make St. Thomas's the parish church. Christmas Day 1881 was the final service in the south transept of the Cathedral.

" Whereas the resolution of the parishioners of the said parish of Saint Oswald at Chester which was passed on the twenty-first day of April one thousand eight hundred and eighty one as aforesaid was passed upon the understanding interalia that we should provide first, a sum of £1,500 for or towards meeting the cost of enlarging and otherwise improving to our satisfaction the said church of St. Thomas, when the same church shall have become the parish church of the said parish of Saint Oswald Chester"

In December 1882 an Order in Council transferred part of the parish to Holy Ascension, Upton:-

"All that portion of the parish of Saint Oswald Chester in the county arid diocese aforesaid which is comprised within and is co-extensive with the limits of the remaining part of the township of Upton aforesaid. All that isolated and detached portion of the said parish of Saint Oswald Chester which abuts upon the western side of the said herein before described portion of the parish of Saint Mary on the Hill Chester aforesaid, and which is comprised within the limits of that part of the township of Blacon with Crabwall, wherein Crabwall Hall is situate."

The dedication of the Church was chosen to be St. Thomas, because during the Middle Ages there was a Chapel dedicated to St. Thomas not far from the present site of the church. A chapel dedicated to St. Thomas Becket stood by 1200 in the graveyard belonging to St. Werburgh's abbey outside the Northgate, in the fork of the later Parkgate and Liverpool roads. Serving also as the meeting place for the abbot's manor court of St. Thomas, it became a private house called Green Hall after the Dissolution. The building probably survived only until the demolition of the northern suburbs during the Civil War siege, though in 1821 it was claimed that the former chapel was still in use as a barn. Today on the site is the pub The George & Dragon.

The church of St. Thomas of Canterbury as built between 1869 and 1872 by Sir George Gilbert Scott had a chancel with a south aisle and an aisled nave of three bays, all in an Early English style. On becoming the parish church in 1881, the church was enlarged to the designs of J. O. Scott (younger son of George Gilbert Scott) with a faculty being granted giving permission to enlarge the nave and aisle by adding two bays and erecting a porch on the north side; to build a tower (which was never completed) and place a clock and bells therein; to place a pulpit, reredos, and sedilia in the church; to remove and re-erect the font at the west end of the church; to construct a heating apparatus; to construct an organ chamber and two vestries for the use of the clergy and choir; to place new seats for use of the choir and seat the whole of the church with open seats; to place stained glass in all the windows (with a spire which was never completed). In 1896 permission was given to re-seat the chancel with oak seats and desks for the choir and clergy, cost of clergy seats to be defrayed by Henry John Birch and John Shenton Latham, churchwardens, cost of choir seats out of a legacy of £100 bequeathed by the late Miss Eliza Ann Ward and by voluntary contributions. The High Altar reredos designed by Charles Deacon was installed in 1909.

Ground plan for the westward extension by two bays, with completion of tower and spire, John Scott

St. Thomas's opened as the parish church in 1881 with between 190 and 250 communicants. Services then included a weekly communion, held in the early morning or at midday. An experiment with a choral communion in 1889 did not meet with universal approval, and Sunday services remained unchanged for another twenty years. More successful was the establishment in 1895 of the mission church of the Good Shepherd on South View Road in the western part of the parish. A curate was required for services there, and in the early 20th century the vicar generally had two curates. In the early 1910s the congregation at the mission church usually numbered 50–80, ten or twenty of whom were communicants, but services were cut back in 1918 and discontinued in 1919. The building seems not to have been used regularly thereafter and in the mid-1960s the mission church of the Good Shepherd was finally closed. The mission church was also home to the Sealand Road C. of E. Infants' school. Sealand Road Infant School was opened in January 1883 in the Mission Church of the Good Shepherd, attached to St. Oswald's parish, in South View, off Tower Wharf. It was forced to close in December 1921 because the managers were unable to carry out structural repairs.

H. E. Burder (vicar 1909–48) introduced Anglo Catholic services at St. Thomas's, with a daily mass and a sung celebration on Sundays, a tradition which continued under his successors. From 1948 onwards the Vicar of St Oswald's Parish was priest in charge of the church of Little St John alias St John without the Northgate, and in 1967 the two benefices were officially united to become The united benefice of St Oswald with Little St John, Chester.

Notice is hereby given that Her Majesty in Council was pleased on the 28th November 1967, to make an Order in Council approving a Scheme framed by the Church Commissioners for effecting the union of the benefice of Saint Oswald, Chester, and the benefice of Little Saint John, Chester, both in the diocese of Chester.

In 1969 Little St John's church ceased to be used for church services when a faculty was granted confirming a lease by the owners, the City Municipal Charities Trustees, to Chester Corporation, for secular use. St. Oswald's Parish was incorporated in the new parish of Chester in 1972, St. Thomas of Canterbury remaining in use as one of four churches serving the parish. The Parish name of Saint Oswald was lost at the formation of the Chester Team Parish, which grouped all the parish churches in the City of Chester into one single parish.

On 1 March 2005 Chester Team Parish was dissolved into two new parishes. The new Parish is called Saint Oswald and Saint Thomas of Canterbury, which restores the ancient Patron Saint of the Parish and incorporates the patron of the parish church. The remaining part of the Team Parish of Chester forms the Parish of Saint Peter with Saint John the Baptist.

The former red brick vicarage and attached parish room were built to serve the parish of St Oswald and the church of St Thomas of Canterbury in 1880 to a design by John Douglas. The building now houses the English Department of The University of Chester.

== The church today ==
The church is still firmly rooted in the Anglo-Catholic tradition on which it was founded.

The parochial church council has recently released the parish's mission statement which is:

- Welcome all people
- Proclaim God's love
- Teach, baptise and nurture
- Respond to human need with loving service
- Rejoice through the beauty of Word, Sacrament and music.

The church also has strong links with the local school which bears its name. Low Mass is currently celebrated three times a week, with choral High Mass on Sundays. Exposition of the Blessed Sacrament takes place most Wednesdays from 2-4pm. There is a well-attended annual Eucharistic Festival. This is usually held in July. The church's patron saint's day is 29 December.

== Organisations ==
St. Thomas' benefits from a number of groups which help support the ministry of the church and provide fellowship among the members. Members of the congregation may join one or more or none of these groups if they wish.

- Sunday School
- Youth Group
- Young Adults Group
- Choir
- Mothers Union
- Association of Christian Fellowship
- Social Group
- Our Lady of Walsingham Cell with a monthly mass on the first Saturday on the month
- Servers Guild

== Structure ==

The church is built in Runcorn red sandstone with a Westmoreland slate roof. Its style is Gothic Revival, designed by Gilbert Scott and is still unfinished. The tower has a ringing chamber but lacks the bell chamber above and spire. some of the tracery around the windows and at the top of the nave columns remains incomplete, it is also possible that the walls and ceiling were intended to be plastered. This has also been left undone. The plan of the church consists of an East Tower at the end of the south aisle, the north aisle and a five-bay nave. The chancel is raised three steps above the nave with a further three steps at the other end of the choir into the sanctuary. There is a Lady Chapel at the end of the north aisle, which again is raised three steps above the nave.

== Architectural features ==
There are two magnificently-carved reredoses by Deacon, one in the Lady Chapel (1913) and one in the sanctuary (1909). The Lady Chapel reredos features a Madonna and Child with the inscription "Magnificat anima mea Dominum, et exsultavit spiritus meus in Deum" from the Magnificat The Lady Chapel Altar has three carved panels featuring a pelican feeding her chicks with her own blood, a Lamb holding a Shepherd's staff with the inscription "Ecce Agnus Dei" and another carved panel depicting an Eagle in flight. Around the base of the Altar is carved the Inscription "I believe in the Communion of Saints" a quotation from the Nicene Creed. Permission was given by a Faculty dated 16 June 1913 to remove the tapestry hangings behind the communion table in the Lady chapel and erect in lieu a reredos of oak with the cost to be defrayed by Helen Catherine Tidswell of Northgate House, the reredos being intended to complete the memorial to her late husband Richard Thomas Tidswell. The Faculty also provided for a canopy of carved oak for the font as a memorial of the late mother of Jane Wright of 22 Chichester Street.

The Reredos in the Sanctuary, which was installed in 1909, was by the architect Charles Deacon (1844–1927) as a memorial of Rev E C Lowndes, and is carved with the Instruments of the Passion. Atop which are four statues of archangels Michael Gabriel Raphael and Uriel. The wooden high altar (in the sanctuary) is decorated with three painted panels, featuring: the Annunciation, the Nativity and the Visitation.

The West Window is by Kempe dating from 1885. The baptismal font at the west end of the church used to have a magnificently-carved suspended cover which collapsed in 1980. Also at the West End there is a Sacristy created in 1897 and a choir vestry.

In the south aisle there is an Altar to St. Oswald & St. Thomas with a Triptych of St. Oswald and St. Thomas of Canterbury which was dedicated on All Saints Day 2005 in memory of Irene Waller. and a wooden desk in memory of Ernest Waller containing a book with the names of the faithful departed.

The tower clock was erected as a thank offering for the birth of Beatrice Mary Latham by her parents John and Almeida Latham, Christmas 1913. The clock was installed by J.B. Joyce and Co from Whitchurch, Shropshire.

The church bell bears the following inscription 'Sanci Oswaldi C W. J W. W W.' and was originally hung in the parish of St. Oswald, Chester and afterwards at Hilbre Island, before being taken from there to St. Oswald's Bidston at the suppression of the religious house and was hung in Bidston until 1856.

== Organ ==
The current three-manual digital organ was installed in 1996 by Wyvern Organs. The first organ was built by the Chester firm of organ builders C.H. Whiteley. This organ was rebuilt in 1901 by the organ builder Young and had three manuals. In 1984 this organ was replaced by a 2 manual organ built by Nicholson & Lord which lasted until 1996 with some of the pipework from the previous organ added to it. The Nicholson and Lord organ remained in the organ case until 2014 whereupon it was removed by Alsopp & Hind Organ Builders. Parts were retained by the builders the remaining was sold as scrap. Former church organists include John Taylor Dean and Joseph Woodcock.

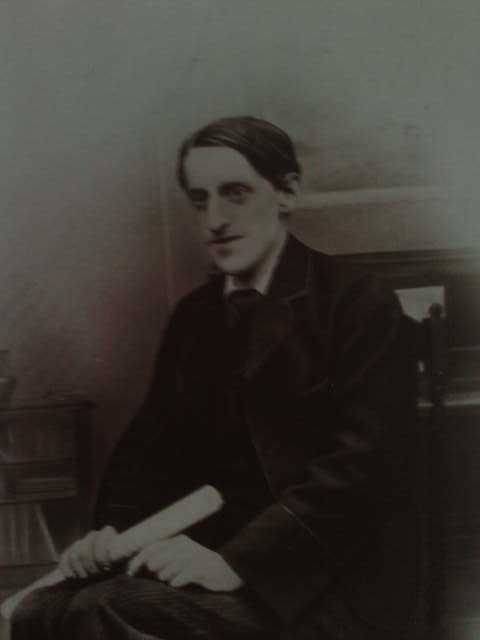
J.T Dean, former organist

== Vicars of the Parish of St. Oswald ==
- 1210 Mag'r Hugo de SVo Oswaldo
- 1310 D'nus Johannes de Faches
- 1364 HughdeCoton
- 1404 D'nus Willielmus Hickekyn & Robertus Drakelow
- 1411 Johannes Torbock & Johannes Barrow
- 1469 Johannes Tomlinson
- 1473 Johannes Rochbottom
- 1492 Henricus Reynford
- 1540 Richard Davys & Richard Burgess
- 1574 William Cowper
- 1580 Martin Rawney
- 1581 John Whitope
- 1599 Rowland Thicknesse
- 1626 William Case
- 1642 John Glendole
- 1672 Lawrence Fogge
- 1699 Arthur Fogge
- 1739 Richard Jackson
- 1761 Charles Henchman
- 1783 Thomas Broadhurst
- 1803 Thomas Mawdesley
- 1819 Joseph Eaton
- 1827 William Harrison
- 1879 William Cogswell
- 1890 Ernest Lowndes
- 1909 Harold Burder
- 1948 John Beddow
- 1963 John Taylor (1967 United Parish with Little St. John's Chester)
- 1974 Tom Virtue (Team Vicar, part of the Chester Team Parish)
- 1983 Douglas Gale (Team Vicar)
- 1987 Colin Potter (Team Vicar)
- 1999 Brian Statham (Team Vicar)
- 2005 Peter Walsh (Formerly Team Rector, appointed to the new Parish of St. Oswald and St. Thomas of Canterbury, 12 February
- 2011 Robert Clack
- 2017 Stephen Sheridan (Priest in Charge)

== Parish charities and workhouse ==
Alderman Edward Batho by will 1629 left rentcharges of 30s a year for bread; by 1862 10s. had been lost and the remaining £1 was given in cash. Edward Russell in 1666 left a rent-charge of £2 10s. to provide bread to 12 poor parishioners on Sundays; no record of payments was found in 1836 but the charity was later revived.

By 1717 £1 a year from Thomas Green's municipal charity was being paid to the churchwardens of St. Oswald's; in 1836 it was distributed among 30 poor widows. Legacies or gifts to the poor of £10 from each of John Mather (d. 1700 or 1701), Peter Cotton (will proved 1716), and the Revd. Thomas Aubrey (will proved 1759) were used to repair the church, but the churchwardens instead distributed bread worth 30s. each year. Separate legacies amounting to at least £454 and £478 were used to buy and fit out a parish workhouse in 1729. It was later leased and the income was diverted to the church rate.

The parish also benefited from five municipal charities. The charities of Batho, Russell, and St. Oswald's portions of two of the municipal charities were united under a Scheme of 1889. Elizabeth Burkinshaw by will proved 1913 left money to benefit the most deserving poor parishioners, it produced c. £3 a year.

Changes in the boundaries of the ancient city-centre parishes in the 20th century made the administration of parochial charities difficult, and under a Scheme of 1988 the eleemosynary charities of St. Bridget's, St. John's, St. Martin's, St. Michael's (except William Jones's almshouses and the Robert Oldfield foundation), St. Oswald's, and St. Peter's were united as the Chester Parochial Relief in Need Charity, for the benefit of those living within the area served by the united benefice of Chester. The charities in St. Olave's were added in 1990, and in 1994.

St. Oswald's Parish first Workhouse was opened in 1730. In a Deed dated 11 December 1757, the nine Chester parishes combined to create a new workhouse. This new workhouse was built by the Corporation on waste ground belonging to them on the north west side of the Roodee, building started in March 1758 on a three-storeyed, four-square rectangular brick building round a courtyard, 200 poor were admitted immediately. In 1762, Chester formed an incorporation of parishes (Holy Trinity, St Bridget, St John the Baptist, St Martin, St Mary on the Hill, St Michael, St Olave, St Oswald, and St Peter) under a local Act of Parliament which gave it greater freedom in the management of the city's poor relief. The incorporation was governed by the mayor, recorder, justices of the peace, and seventy-four other guardians. The Act also gave control of the Roodee workhouse for a period of 99 years.

Chester's Incorporation status exempted it from most of the provisions of the 1834 Act. The Roodee workhouse continued in use, with offices and a boys' school located at 34 Bridge Street. In 1869, Chester was reconstituted as a Poor Law Union which formally came into being on 30 September 1869. Its operation was overseen by an elected Board of Guardians, 19 in number, representing its 9 constituent parishes: Holy and Undivided Trinity (2 guardians), St Bridget, St John the Baptist (5), St Martin, St Mary-on-the-Hill (3), St Michael, St Olave, St Oswald (4), and St Peter. A new workhouse was built Hoole in 1873 at a cost of about £30,000. The design for the buildings was opened to competition and the winning plans were submitted by W Perkin and Sons. The new workhouse had a large T-shaped main building facing to the east, with a separate infirmary to its west and a school to the south.

The new workhouse was opened in 1877. The old Roodee workhouse site was used as a confectionery works by the Cheshire Preserving Company. The old workhouse building was demolished between 1902 and 1909.

== Church school ==
The building of a National School in Parkgate Road, in St. Oswald's parish, was started in 1871. This followed the building in Parkgate Road, in 1871, of a church dedicated to St. Thomas, which in 1881 became the parish church of St. Oswald's parish. In February 1871 an appeal was made to the National Society for funds towards the building of the school. This appeal gave two reasons for building the school, one being `to supply a want for a new district which has sprung up', and the other `to obviate the necessity which might otherwise arise for building a rate-aided school in this district'. The National Society voted £55 towards the cost of building St. Thomas' school. Land was donated by the church and a grant of £55 was given by the National Society allowing for the first part of the school to be built. The school doors opened on 25 March 1873. An extension was added in 1887 and further additions being built in the 1970s and 1980s.

When the school was opened it was for girls and boys of infant age. During the Second World War local children shared the premises with evacuees from Liverpool, and in more recent years it was middle school and since 1984 it has been a junior school.

Chester Blue Coat Trustees are responsible for part of the financing of the school, particularly with regards to the building. The school closed in July 2011 to be replaced by a new church school Chester Blue Coat CE Primary School which opened in September 2011.

== The Roll of Honour, 1914-1918 and 1939-1945 ==
Eric Aderne	Henry William Benbow	Robert Brennand
Dennis Brown	Dennis Cooper	Harold Cecil Cotter
John Ellis	Gordon Fields	William Edward Gartlan
Alfred Greenwood	Arthur Hughes	Dewi Erfil Jones
Albert George Luke	Alfred Martin	George Roberts
Peter Rahil	Albert Robinson	Harold Rowe
Kenneth Sidwell	Patrick Crawford Simpson	Leslie Brain Tinkler
Owen Thomas	Sydney Trout	Frank Williams
Herbert Williams	Jack Williams	Robert Williams
Ronald Williams	Cecil Wright	James Yates

== Church records ==
Original Registers

Cheshire Record Office (P 29)

- Christenings 1872–1948
- Marriages 1877–1969

Church

- Christenings from 1949
- Marriages from 1969
- Burials — none

Microfilm copies

- Cheshire Record Office - Christenings 1872–1945 ; Marriages 1877–1969
- Manchester Archives & Local Studies and Family History Society of Cheshire - Christenings 1872–1945 ; Marriages 1877–1931

Copies and indexes

- Marriages 1877–1958 — Cheshire BMD (CW:CE15)

== See also ==
- List of new churches by George Gilbert Scott in Northern England
- Grade II listed buildings in Chester (north and west)
