= Paige Cox =

English archdeacon

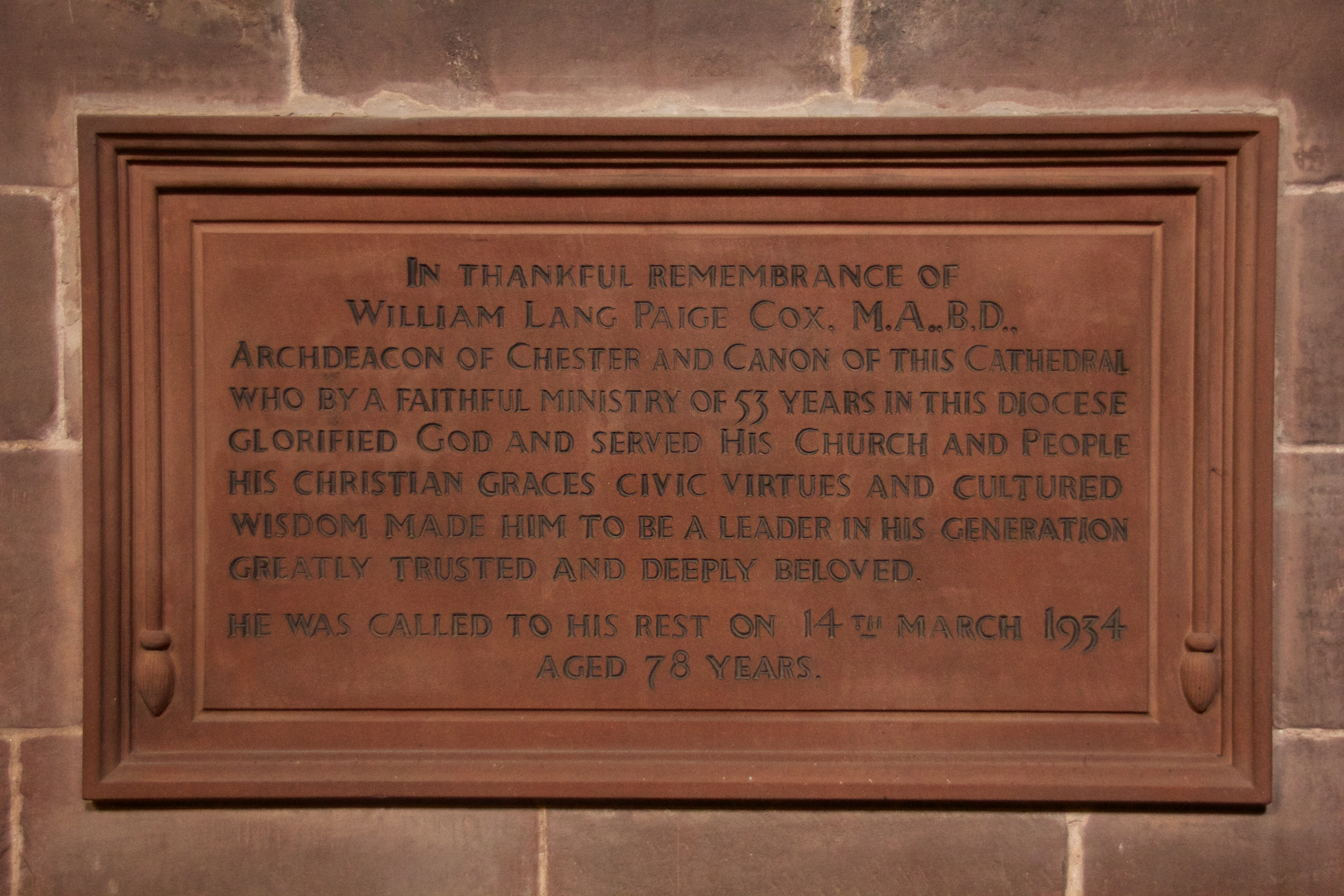
Memorial to William Lang Paige Cox in Chester Cathedral

William Lang Paige Cox was Archdeacon of Chester from 1914 until his death in 1934.

Born on 6 September 1855 he was educated at King William's College in the Isle of Man and Trinity College, Dublin. He was ordained Deacon in 1878; and Priest in 1879. After a curacy in Teynham he was Vicar of Rock Ferry from 1882 to 1904. He married Edith Margaret Charley on 6 May 1884. He was Rural Dean of Birkenhead from 1895 to 1901; Chester Diocesan Lecturer in Divinity for 1907; Vicar of Alderley Edge from 1904 to 1913; then Hoylake from 1913 to 1917; Examining Chaplain to the Bishop of Chester from 1914; an Honorary Canon of Chester Cathedral from 1904 to 1914 (he was a Residentiary Canon from 1917); and Select Preacher at Cambridge in 1927.

A published author he died on 14 March 1934.

== Notes ==
Church of England titles
Preceded by Edward Barber	Archdeacon of Chester; 1914–1934	Succeeded by Norman Henry Tubbs
