= Robert Perceval (priest) =

Robert Perceval was an Anglican priest in the 16th-century.

Perceval was Rector of Risley. He was appointed Archdeacon of Chester in 1559 but deprived by Queen Elizabeth.
