= George Travis =

George Travis (1741, Royton – 1797, Hampstead) was Archdeacon of Chester from his installation on 27 November 1786 until his death on 24 February 1797.

Travis was educated at Manchester Grammar School and St John's College, Cambridge. He was ordained deacon on 3 March 1765; and priest on 22 December 1765. He held livings at Eastham, Bromborough and Handley.

Church of England titles
Preceded by George Taylor	Archdeacon of Chester; 1786–1797	Succeeded by Unwin Clarke
