= All Saints' Church, Hoole =

All Saints Church, Hoole
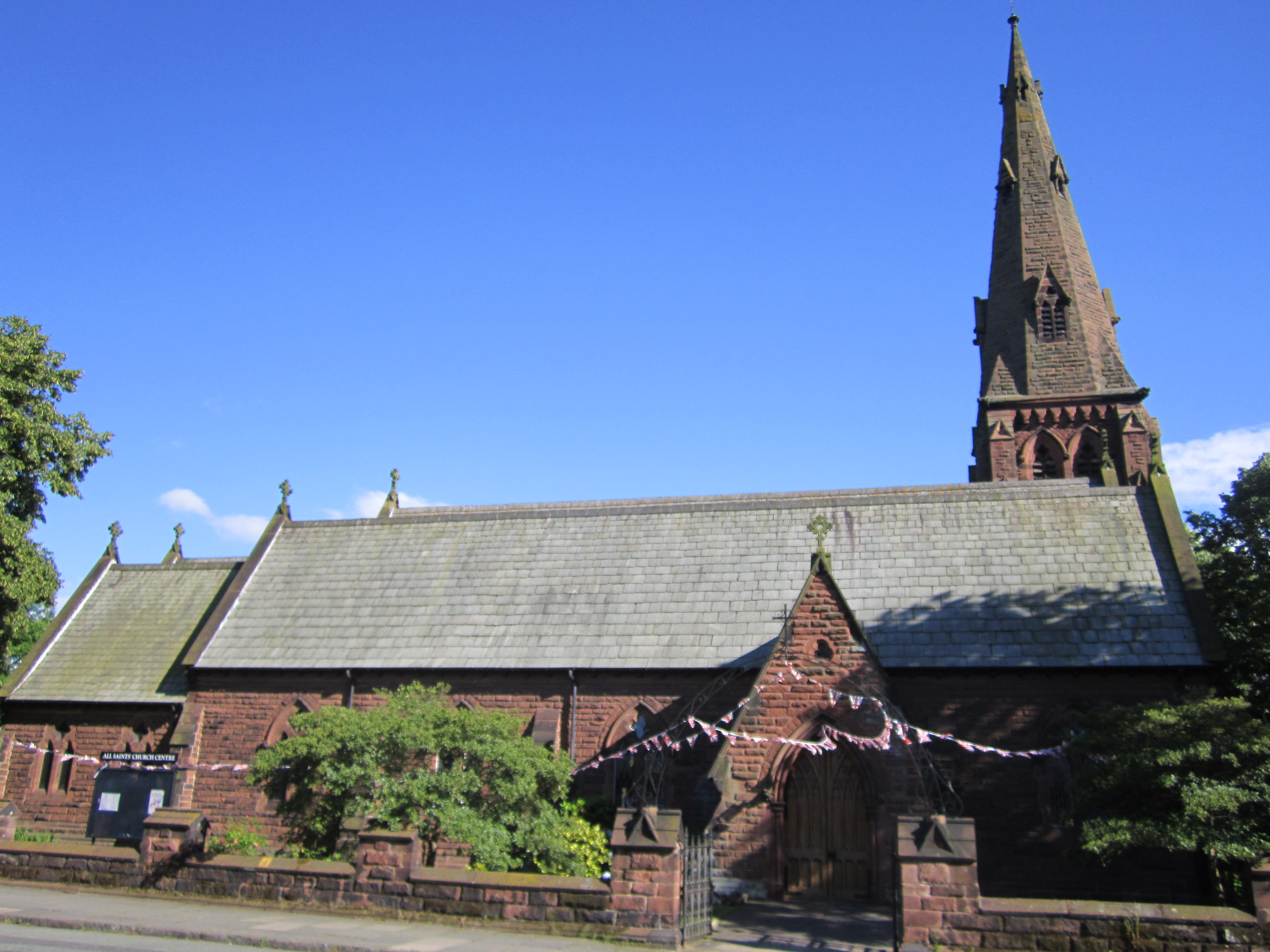
- All Saints Church, Hoole
- 53.2012°N 2.8727°W
- OS grid reference: SJ 418 674
- Location: Hoole Road, Hoole, Chester, Cheshire
- Country: England
- Denomination: Anglican
- Website: allsaints.church

History
- Status: Parish church

Architecture
- Functional status: Active
- Heritage designation: Grade II
- Designated: 23 July 1998
- Architect(s): S. W. Dawkes; John Douglas and F. (or J.) Walley
- Architectural type: Church
- Style: Gothic Revival
- Groundbreaking: 1867
- Completed: 1912

Specifications
- Materials: Red sandstone Grey-green slate roofs

Administration
- Province: York
- Diocese: Chester
- Archdeaconry: Chester
- Deanery: Chester
- Parish: All Saints, Hoole

Clergy
- Vicar: Rev Craig Gaudion

All Saints Church, Hoole, is in Hoole Road, Hoole, Chester, Cheshire, England. It is an active Anglican parish church in the deanery of Chester, the archdeaconry of Chester and the diocese of Chester, and is recorded in the National Heritage List for England as a designated Grade II listed building.

== History ==
The church was built in 1867 to a design by S. W. Dawkes. In 1911 a vestry was added. The following year the south aisle was built; it was designed by John Douglas in collaboration with F. (or J.) Walley, but not completed until after Douglas' death. The furnishing of the church was reordered in the later part of the 20th century by Graham Holland.

== Architecture ==
The church is built in red sandstone with grey-green slate roofs. Its plan consists of a five-bay nave with north and south aisles, all under separate roofs, a chancel, a southwest tower with a broach spire, a flat roofed vestry at the southeast, and a north porch with a gable. The windows have plate tracery.

=== Bells ===
The tower holds a ring of six bells hung for full circle ringing. The five original bells were cast by John Warner & Sons of Cripplegate and bear inscriptions dating their casting to 1867 (third and fourth) and 1868 (second, fifth and tenor). The tenor bell weighs approximately 7½ cwt (840 lb or ~380 kg) and is in the note of B. A new treble, cast by Mears & Stainbank of Whitechapel, was installed in 1925 completing the ring of six.

== See also ==
- Grade II listed buildings in Chester (north and west)
- List of church restorations, amendments and furniture by John Douglas
