= Lewis Stephens =

Lewis Stephens was Archdeacon of Barnstaple and Archdeacon of Chester.

He was born the son of Lewis Stephens of Menheniot, Cornwall.

He was a cleric at Christ Church, matriculating in 1708 and graduating B.A. in 1712, M.A. in 1715 and B.D and D.D. in 1737.

He was chaplain to Charles Trimnell, the bishop of Norwich and to Dr. Blackburne, the bishop of Exeter, becoming rector of Chilbolton, Hampshire in 1718-1722 and of Droxford, Hampshire from 1722 to 1747. He was collated archdeacon of Barnstaple in 1724 (serving until 1731) and Archdeacon of Chester from 1727 to 1747. He was also a prebendary of York Minster in 1727, of Southwell cathedral in 1729 and of Exeter cathedral from 1731 to 1746.
