= Michael Gilbertson (priest) =

English priest

Michael Robert Gilbertson (born 18 August 1961) is the current Archdeacon of Chester.

== Early life and education ==
Born in Stockport on 18 August 1961, he was educated at Stockport Grammar School and New College, Oxford.

After a career in the Civil Service, he trained for the Anglican ministry at Cranmer Hall, Durham.

He lives in Huntington, Chester with his wife Jenny. They have two adult children.

== Ordained ministry ==
He was ordained in 1997. He was a curate at St Matthew's, Surbiton then Vicar of All Saints, Stranton, Hartlepool before his appointment as archdeacon in May 2010.

Church of England titles
Preceded by Donald Allister	Archdeacon of Chester; 2010–present	Incumbent
