= Archdeacon of Chester =

Church of England ecclesiastical office

The Archdeacon of Chester is a senior ecclesiastical officer in the diocese of Chester. The area in which they have statutory duties is the Archdeaconry of Chester. Those duties include some pastoral care and disciplinary supervision of the clergy in the area.

The archdeaconry was created before 1135 in (what was in 1222) the Diocese of Coventry (that diocese was called Coventry and Lichfield from 1228 and then Lichfield and Coventry from 1539); it formed part of the Diocese of Chester upon her creation in 1541 and remains so today.

== List of archdeacons ==
=== High Medieval ===
- Halmar
- William
- Robert (I)
- bef. 1135–aft. 1135: Richard Peche (later Bishop of Coventry)
- Adam de Stafford
- c. 1139–1149: William de Villars
- 1149–1152: Robert (II)
- Hugh
- Thomas de Sancto Nicholao
- bef. 1222–aft. 1231: Ralph de Maidstone (also Dean of Hereford from 1231)

In 1228, Coventry diocese became the Diocese of Coventry and Lichfield.

- bef. 1245–1246 (res.): Silvester de Everdon (became Bishop of Carlisle)
- bef. 1248–aft. 1248: Richard
- bef. 1253–aft. 1253: John Basing
- Simon de Albo Monasterio, Abbot of St Werburgh's Abbey
- bef. 1271–aft. 1271: Adam de Stanford or Stafford
- bef. 1279–aft. 1284: Jordan of Wimborne/de Wimburn
- bef. 1289–1315 (d.): Robert de Radewell

=== Late Medieval ===
- bef. 1315–bef. 1341 (d.): Richard de Havering
- 26 April–10 December 1330: John de Ufford (royal grant revoked)
- 29 January 1341–aft. August 1342 (res.): Michael Northburgh
- August 1342–14 July 1348 (d.): Pedro Cardinal Gòmez de Barroso (cardinal-bishop of Sabina)
- 30 October 1348–bef. 1385 (res.): William de Navesby
- 16 October 1385 – 11 March 1387 (exch.): Nicholas Slake
- 11 March 1387–bef. 1390 (d.): John de Herlaston
- 22 February 1388–?: John Ganville (ineffective royal grant)
- 10 July 1390 – 15 May 1413 (exch.): William de Neuhagh
- 15 May 1413–bef. 1423 (d.): Henry de Halsall
- 7 March 1423–bef. 1425 (d.): David Price
- 5 July 1425–bef. 1433 (d.): Richard Stanley
- 6 March 1433–bef. 1449 (d.): John Burdet
- 26 April 1449–bef. 1454 (d.): George Radclyf
- 19 January 1454–bef. 1462 (d.): Sir Edward Stanley
- 5 November 1462–bef. 1467 (d.): Thomas St Just
- 10 October 1467–bef. 1474 (d.): Henry Ince
- 9 May 1474 – 1478 (res.): John Morton
- bef. 1478–bef. 1485 (d.): James Stanley
- 5 June 1485–bef. 1493 (d.): Christopher Talbot
- 11 February 1493 – 1499 (d.): Edmund Chaderton, Archdeacon of Salisbury (also Archdeacon of Totnes)
- 28 August 1499 – 1519 (res.): John Vesey
- 17 November 1519 – 1522 (res.): Cuthbert Tunstall
- 11 November 1522 – 20 May 1541 (surr.): William Knight

In 1539, the Diocese of Coventry and Lichfield was renamed to Lichfield and Coventry.
In 1541, the Diocese of Chester was created and Chester became part of the new diocese.

=== Early modern ===
- 5 August 1541 – 1554 (deprived): John Birde, Bishop of Chester
- bef. 1559–1559 (deprived): Robert Perceval (deprived)
- aft. 1559–aft. 1562: Robert Perceval/Percival (restored)
- bef. 1566–bef. 1595 (d.): Robert Rogers
- 3 January 1596–bef. 1619 (res.): Cuthbert Bellott
- 16 January 1619 – 5 February 1656 (d.): George Snell
- 19 October 1660–bef. 1667 (d.): John Carter
- 6 November 1666 – 7 April 1686 (d.): William Finmore
- 12 April 1686 – 17 April 1695 (d.): John Allen
- 30 April 1695 – 15 September 1707 (d.): Edmund Entwisle
- February 1708–30 June 1727 (d.): John Thane
- 12 September 1727 – 2 February 1747 (d.): Lewis Stephens
- 22 April 1747 – 13 April 1751 (d.): William Powell
- 20 April 1751 – 1 October 1785 (d.): Abel Ward
- 21 January–20 November 1786 (res.): George Taylor
- 27 November 1786 – 24 February 1797 (d.): George Travis
- 11 March 1797 – 29 December 1800 (d.): Thomas Breithweite
- 17 January 1801–bef. 1847 (d.): Unwin Clarke
- 23 February 1847 – 7 June 1865 (d.): Isaac Wood
- July 1865 - 29 August 1866 (d.): Edward Woolnough

=== Late modern ===
- September 1866 – 1867 (d.): Richard Greenall (11 May 1806 – 27 November 1867)
- 1867–1871 (res.): William Pollock (22 April 1812 – 11 October 1873)
- 1871–1876 (res.): Edward Johnson
- 1877–1886 (res.): John Darby
- 1886–23 July 1914 (d.): Edward Barber
- 1914–14 March 1934 (d.): Paige Cox
- 1934–1937 (ret.): Norman Tubbs, Assistant Bishop
- 1937–1965 (ret.): Richard Burne (afterwards archdeacon emeritus)
- 1965–1975 (ret.): Leslie Fisher (afterwards archdeacon emeritus)
- 1975–1988 (ret.): Leslie Williams
- 1988–1993 (res.): Michael Gear
- 1993–1994 (res.): Geoffrey Turner
- 1994–2002 (ret.): Christopher Hewetson (afterwards archdeacon emeritus)
- 2002–2010 (res.): Donald Allister
- September 2010–present: Michael Gilbertson

== Sources ==
- Le Neve, John; Hardy, Sir Thomas Duffus (1854). Archdeacons of Chester . Fasti ecclesiae Anglicanae. Vol. 1. Oxford: Oxford University Press. pp. 565–567 – via Wikisource.
- Jones, B. (1964), Fasti Ecclesiae Anglicanae 1300–1541, vol. 10, pp. 12–14
- Horn, Joyce M.; Smith, David M.; Mussett, Patrick (2004), Fasti Ecclesiae Anglicanae 1541–1857, vol. 11, pp. 45–47
