= Richard Greenall =

Richard Greenall (11 May 1806 – 27 November 1867) was Archdeacon of Chester from September 1866 until his death.

Greenall was born at Wilderspool and educated at Brasenose College, Oxford, where he matriculated in 1824, graduating B.A. in 1828, and M.A. in 1831. He was the Incumbent at Stretton, Warrington from 1831.

Church of England titles
Preceded by Edward Woolnough	Archdeacon of Chester; 1866–1867	Succeeded by William Pollock
