= Robert Rogers (priest) =

Robert Rogers was an Anglican priest and Antiquary in the second half of the 16th-century.

Rogers was educated at Christ Church, Oxford. He was appointed Archdeacon of Chester in 1566 and Canon of Chester Cathedral in 1580, holding both positions until his death in 1595.
