= St Barnabas' Church, Chester =

Coordinates: 53.1967°N 2.8828°W

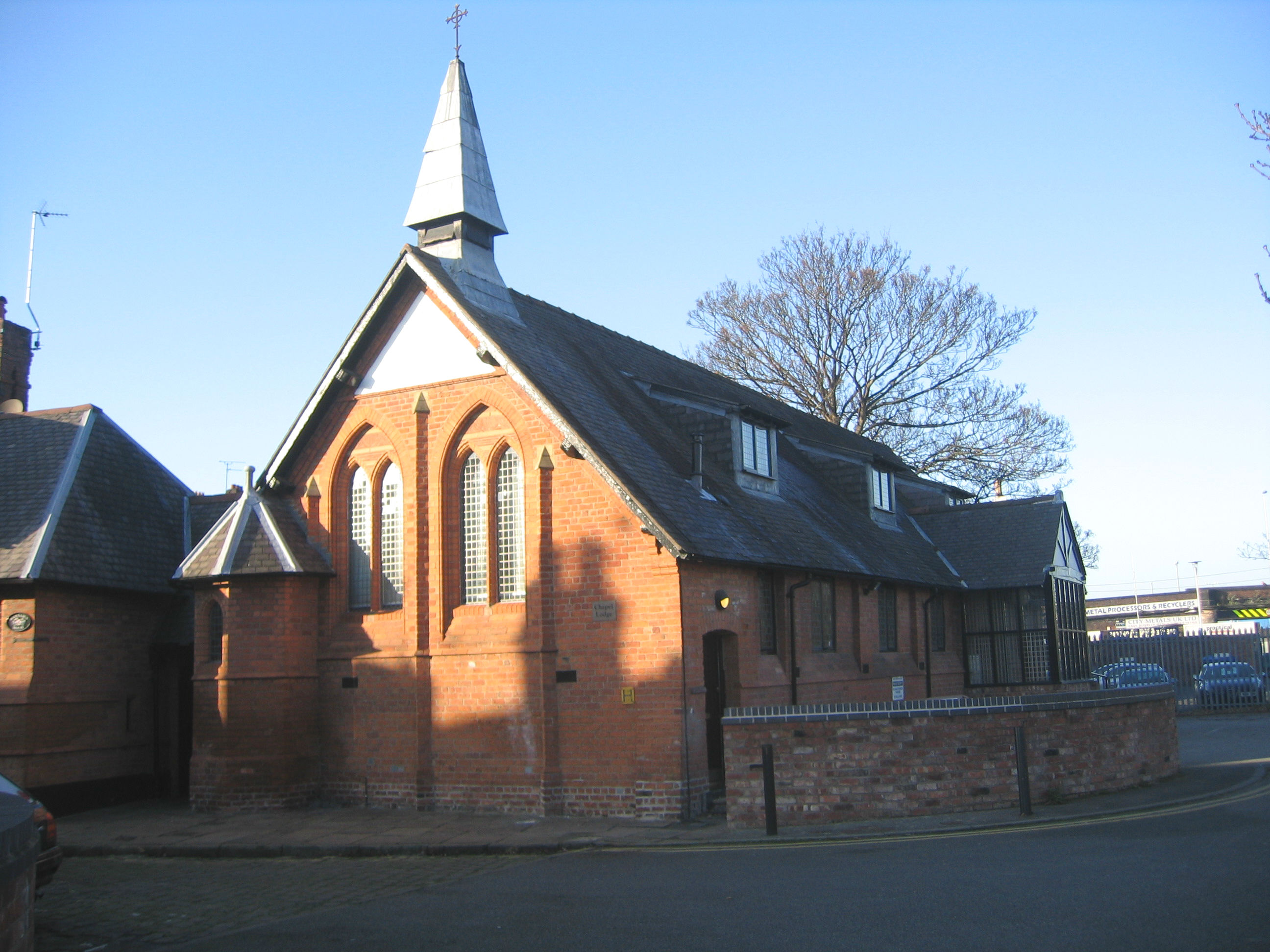
- St Barnabas' Church

- Location in Cheshire
- OS grid reference: SJ 411 669
- Location: Sibell Street, Chester, Cheshire
- Country: England
- Denomination: Anglican

History
- Dedication: St Barnabas

Architecture
- Functional status: Redundant
- Heritage designation: Grade II
- Designated: 19 July 1985
- Architect: John Douglas
- Architectural type: Church
- Completed: 1877

Specifications
- Materials: Church: brick with stone dressings House: brick with a timber-framed front Slate roofs

St Barnabas' Church is a redundant Anglican church in Sibell Street, Chester, Cheshire, England. It is recorded in the National Heritage List for England as a designated Grade II listed building. It was originally built as a mission church, financed from public subscription, to serve the workers living near Chester railway station. The church and the adjacent curate's house were designed by John Douglas in 1877.

The church is built in brick with stone dressings. The house is also in brick with a timber-framed front. Both have slated roofs. The church has a six-bay nave which is continuous with a one-bay chancel. There is a two-bay north transept with an attached eastern vestry, a west porch and an octagonal northwest baptistry. On the roof is a flèche surmounted by ball and cross. Between the church and the curate's house is a roofed lobby. From 1985 to 1987 the church was used by the Orthodox Christian parish of St Barbara's before the community moved due to the dilapidated state of the building. The church has subsequently been used as offices.

== See also ==
- Grade II listed buildings in Chester (north and west)
- List of new churches by John Douglas
