= St Oswald's Vicarage, Chester =

- Location in Cheshire
- 53.1980°N 2.8958°W
- Location: Parkgate Road, Chester, Cheshire, England

History
- Built: 1880

Site notes
- Architect: John Douglas

Listed Building – Grade II
- Designated: 10 January 1972
- Reference no.: 1375900

St Oswald's Vicarage is on Parkgate Road, Chester, Cheshire, England. It is recorded in the National Heritage List for England as a designated Grade II listed building.

== History ==
The vicarage and attached parish room were built to serve the parish of St Oswald and the church of St Thomas of Canterbury in 1880 to a design by John Douglas. The building now houses the English Department of Chester University. This vicarage replaced the former parish vicarages in Parsons Street (now Princess Street) and Leen Lane.

== Architecture ==
The building is constructed in red-brown brick with Westmorland green slate roofs. Its main front faces northeast. The left wing has two storeys; it protrudes forward with an apsidal end. Its lower storey contains a porch, with steps leading up to an arched door. To the right of this is a two-storeyed section with mullioned and transomed arched windows in the lower storey, and mullioned windows in the upper storey. Between these is a row of rectangular plaster panels. To the right of this is a two-storeyed projection, the upper storey being set back from the lower storey. A stair turret to the right of this has a pyramidal roof with a weather vane. The right bay has two storeys plus an attic gable. On the ground floor is a five-light mullioned and transomed window and above this is a five-light mullioned window. In the gable is a three-light window surrounded by lozenge panels and brick diapering. The parish room on the extreme right has three bays divided by buttresses and contains arched windows.

== See also ==
- Grade II listed buildings in Chester (north and west)
- List of houses and associated buildings by John Douglas
