= Richard Burne =

Richard Vernon Higgins Burne FSA (19 March 1882 – 9 March 1970) was Archdeacon of Chester from 1937 to 1965.

Burne was educated at Malvern College, Keble College, Oxford and Ripon College Cuddesdon. After a curacy in Slough he became chaplain to the Charles Ferguson-Davie, the Bishop of Singapore, in 1913. During World War I he was a chaplain to the British Armed Forces. After the war he was a tutor at the Ordination Test School, Knutsford; and then its principal from 1923 until his archdeacon’s appointment.

Church of England titles
Preceded by Norman Henry Tubbs	Archdeacon of Chester; 1937–1965	Succeeded by Leslie Gravatt Fisher
