= Christopher Hewetson (priest) =

English Anglican priest (1937–2024)

Christopher Hewetson (1 June 1937 – 2 April 2024) was Archdeacon of Chester from 1994 to 2002.

== Biography ==
Born on 1 June 1937 he was educated at Shrewsbury School and Trinity College, Oxford. After an earlier career as a school teacher he was ordained in 1970 following a period of study at Chichester Theological College. After curacies in Leckhampton and Wokingham he was successively: vicar of St Peter's, Didcot from 1973 to 1982; rector of All Saints, Ascot from 1982 to 1990; and priest in charge of Holy Trinity, Headington Quarry from 1990 to 1994.

Hewetson died on 2 April 2024, at the age of 86.

== Notes ==
Church of England titles
Preceded by Geoffrey Turner	Archdeacon of Chester; 1994–2002	Succeeded by Donald Allister
