= John Darby (Dean of Chester) =

John Lionel Darby (20 November 1831 – 5 November 1919) was Dean of Chester in the last decades of the 19th century and the first two of the 20th.

Born in County Kilkenny, Ireland into an ecclesiastical family as the youngest son of Christopher Darby, sometime Rector of Kells, County Kilkenny on 20 November 1831, he was educated at St Columba's College and Trinity College Dublin and ordained in 1857. He began his career with curacies at Winwick and Mells. He was the Incumbent of Newburgh, Lancashire from 1859 to 1868. Later he was Diocesan Inspector for the Diocese of Chester and Rector of St Bridget's, Chester. He was Archdeacon of Chester from 1877 until 1886 and his elevation to the Deanery.

He died on 5 November 1919.

== Notes ==
Church of England titles
Preceded by John Saul Howson	Dean of Chester; 1886 – 1919	Succeeded by Frank Selwyn Macaulay Bennett
