= George Dixon Snell =

American politician

George Dixon Snell (March 18, 1836 – May 12, 1911) was the mayor of Spanish Fork, Utah Territory from 1873 until 1881 as well as two earlier periods.

Snell was born in New Brunswick. His parents, Cyrus Snell and Rhoda Barnes joined the Church of Jesus Christ of Latter-day Saints (LDS Church) two months after his birth and in 1853 moved to Utah Territory. He went with them there. In 1856 he went to California and then returned to Utah the following year in a company led by Perrigrine Sessions. He was part of the Nauvoo Legion during its resistance to the federal government's intervention in Utah. It was while serving in the Nauvoo Legion that Snell was baptized a Latter-day Saint.

Snell first became mayor of Spanish Fork in 1861, but only served for a short time. He was again elected mayor for a short time in 1865. During Utah's Black Hawk War Snell was the chief officer of the Nauvoo Legion in Spanish Fork.

In 1879 Snell served in the Utah Territorial legislature, and in 1882 he served as a delegate to the Utah Constitutional Convention.

In addition to serving as mayor of Spanish Fork, Snell served as bishop of the LDS Church's ward in Spanish Fork from 1874 until 1902, some of this after Spanish Fork was split into multiple wards, during which time Snell served as bishop of the Spanish Fork 2nd ward.

Snell's first wife was Sinia Lucinda Dennis whom he married in 1863. She died in 1868, all three of their children having died in infancy. He was a polygamist, marrying Alexandrina McLean (1846–1921) in 1868 and Thorgerda Bjarnsson (1858–1946) in 1879.
