= Joseph Turner (architect) =

Joseph Turner (c. 1729–1807) was an architect of Welsh origin who worked in the 18th century. Most of his major works were in North Wales, and in Chester, Cheshire. Almost all of them were in Georgian style, with at least one work in Gothic style, in Mold, Flintshire, Wales. Turner also designed memorials in Chester Cathedral, and in the churches of St Peter, Prestbury, St Margaret, Wrenbury, St Peter, Ruthin, and St Collen, Llangollen. Turner was a member of Chester Assembly.

== Major works ==
=== Key ===
Grade	Criteria
I	Buildings of exceptional interest, sometimes considered to be internationally important
II*	Particularly important buildings of more than special interest
II	Buildings of national importance and special interest

Name	Location	Photograph	Date	Notes	Grade
Chirk Castle	Chirk, Wrexham, Wales; 52.9352°N 3.0897°W		1760s–1770s	Alterations, including provision of new windows, a "Green House" in the garden (1767) (later rebuilt), stables (1768–69), the state dining room (c. 1770–71), and a new staircase leading to the state rooms (1778).	I
St Mary's Church, Mold	Mold, Flintshire, Wales; 53.1691°N 3.1430°W		1768–73	Turner added the tower in "a credible 18th-century attempt at Georgian style".	I
Bridge	St Asaph, Denbighshire, Wales; 53.2564°N 3.4476°W	—	1770	A five-arched bridge over the River Elwy.	II*
New Hall Lodge, Chirk Castle	Chirk, Wrexham, Wales; 52.9414°N 3.0801°W	—	1770	A pair of lodges in Georgian style at the entrance to Chirk Park.	II
Entrance gates, lodge and screen	Oulton Estate, Cheshire; 53.1837°N 2.6136°W		c. 1775	The entrance to the former country house on Oulton Estate.	II*
Lighthouse	Point of Ayr, Flintshire, Wales; 53.3570°N 3.3222°W		1777	A lighthouse at the northernmost point of Wales.	II
Dyffryn Aled	Llansannan, Conwy, Wales		1777	A house demolished in about 1920.	—
10–28 Nicholas Street	Chester, Cheshire; 53.1891°N 2.8951°W	—	1780	A terrace of ten town houses in Georgian style.	II
Bridgegate	Chester, Cheshire; 53.1862°N 2.8893°W		1781	A replacement for an earlier gateway at the southern entrance to the city. It is in Neoclassical style.	I
Flintshire County Gaol	Flint Castle, Flint, Flintshire, Wales	—	1784–85	Built in the outer ward of the castle, this was demolished in 1969.	—
Ruthin Library	Record Street, Ruthin, Denbighshire, Wales; 53.1135°N 3.3095°W		1785–90	Built initially as a record office, it was extended to be the county hall, including a courthouse. It later became the town's library.	II*
Watergate	Chester, Cheshire; 53.1894°N 2.8974°W		1788	A replacement for an earlier gateway at the western entrance to the city.	I
Bridge of Sighs	Chester, Cheshire; 53.1939°N 2.8937°W		1793	A bridge linking the former gaol to the chapel of Bluecoat School.	II
