= George Snell (archdeacon of Chester) =

George Snell was a priest

George Snell was an Anglican priest in the Sixteenth Century.

Snell was educated at the University of St Andrews. He was Incorporated at Oxford in 1621. He held livings at Wallasey, Great Smeaton and Waverton. He was Archdeacon of Chester until his death on 5 February 1556. He was buried at St Mary's Church in Chester.
