= Cuthbert Bellott =

Anglican priest

Cuthbert Bellott was an Anglican priest in the late 16th and early 17th centuries.

Bellott was born in Moreton, Cheshire and educated at Jesus College, Cambridge, where he became a Fellow in 1586. He was appointed Canon (9th Prebend) of Westminster Abbey in 1594 and Archdeacon of Chester in 1596. He died in 1620.
