= William Finmore =

Anglican priest

William Finmore was a seventeenth-century Anglican priest.

== Background and education ==
Born c. 1623–25, Finmore was the son of William Finmore (d. 1677) and his wife, Katherine Cox. The family resided in North Hinksey, which was located in Berkshire at the time, explaining why Finmore was often called a “Berkshire man.” He was perhaps a twin of his brother Richard, a verger at Christ Church, Oxford.

Finmore was educated at Westminster School, where he was a student of the renowned Dr. Richard Busby (d. 1695). In 1642, he entered Christ Church, Oxford, being notated as “gen. fil.” (son of a gentleman). While at Christ Church, he served as tutor to Philip Henry, the father of Matthew Henry, the well-known Bible commentator.

Finmore graduated BA in 1646, and MA on 25 June 1649.

== Career ==
At the Restoration of the monarchy in 1660, Finmore was initially granted a fellowship in Manchester Collegiate Church but was not admitted to the post due to irregularities in the nominating process. In March 1662, he petitioned to become King Charles II’s preacher in the county palatine of Chester but was once again disappointed as the position had already been filled by another candidate. However, later in the year, he was made vicar of Runcorn, Cheshire.

Finmore’s connection with the Diocese of Chester began on July 25, 1664, when he was appointed prebendary of the sixth stall, succeeding Dr. Thomas Mallory. On November 6, 1666, he succeeded John Carter as Archdeacon of Chester, which position he held until his death in 1686. At Chester, he also served as treasurer to the Cathedral.

== Royalist sympathies ==
William Finmore’s time at Oxford (1642-1649) coincided with the English Civil War (1642-1651), and he was present in the city during the Siege of Oxford (1644-1646). Finmore, who was strongly sympathetic to the Royalist cause, showed his admiration for Colonel Henry Gage, who led a column of 800 foot and horse to relieve Basing House in 1644. When Gage, as governor of Oxford, fell to his death while leading the attack to destroy Culham Bridge in 1645, Finmore penned a 46-line poem in his honor, the last stanza rendered here in modern spelling:

So great his virtues were that when he failed,
No man was more beloved, none more bewailed,
But let not bloody foes lift up their head
Because our army's flower's withered.
Neither let us be fearful of the foe,
Drooping our heads and fainting with the blow;
His renowned acts will eternize his fame,
And we’ll still fright the Rebels with his Name.

Finmore was still a student at Christ Church in 1647 at the time of the parliamentary visitation of the University of Oxford. In the Register of the Visitors of Oxford for that year, he is entered as a non-subscriber, that is, one who did not accept the Parliamentarian confession of faith, answering, "I am not yet satisfied how I may with a safe conscience submit to this visitation." So strong was Finmore's loyalty to the House of Stuart that it was noted on his funeral monument in these lines composed by his widow, Mary:

Vir alioqui
cum suavitate et probitate morum
tum varia eruditione atq constanti in regem fide
undiquaque spectabilis.

Otherwise, a man
with gentleness and honesty of behavior,
as well as various learning and constant faith in the king
and respected on every side.

== Family ==
With his first wife, Philippa, William Finmore had two sons: William and John. With his second wife, Mary Bennett, he had two daughters: Mary (b. 1681), whose husband, the Rev. Robert Cheshire, also became vicar of Runcorn; and Sarah (b. 1683).

== Death and burial ==
Archdeacon William Finmore died April 7, 1686, and was buried in the north aisle of St. Mary's Chapel in Chester Cathedral.
