= George Taylor (priest) =

- Archdeacon of Chester
- Church: Church of England
- Diocese: Diocese of Chester
- Installed: 1786-01-21
- Term ended: 1786-11-20 (resigned)
- Predecessor: Richard Smallbroke
- Successor: Robert Clive
- Previous post: Rector of Aldford (from 1769)

Personal details
- Died: 1811

George Taylor (died 1811) was Rector of Aldford from 1769 until his death; and Archdeacon of Chester from 21 January 1786 to his resignation on 20 November 1786.

Church of England titles
| Preceded by Abel Ward | Archdeacon of Chester; 1786 (21 January)–1786 (20 November) | Succeeded by George Travis |
