= John Thane (priest) =

English churchman

John Thayne or Thane was an English churchman, Archdeacon of Chester in 1707.

== Life ==
Thane's father was a physician at Lynne, and his mother was a sister of John Pearson. He was educated at Trinity College, Cambridge and incorporated at Oxford in 1682. He held livings at Kirby Underdale and Northenden. He was appointed a Canon of Chester Cathedral in 1686 and Archdeacon of Chester from 1707, holding both positions until his death on 30 June 1727. He is buried at the cathedral.

On Pearson's death, the bulk of his books and papers went to Thane. Thane acted as editor for his works on chronography. He wrote to Thomas Barlow in 1686, the year of Pearson's death, going over plans to publish Pearson's works. He edited Pearson's Opera Postuma Chronologica.
