= Isaac L. Wood =

American serial killer

- Born: c. 1822; New Providence, New Jersey, U.S.
- Died: July 9, 1858 (aged 35–36); Genesee County, New York, U.S.
- Cause of death: Execution by hanging
- Conviction: First degree murder
- Penalty: Death

Details
- Victims: 2–3
- Span of crimes: May – June 1855
- Country: United States
- States: New Jersey, New York
- Date apprehended: January 1857

Isaac L. Wood (c. 1822 – July 9, 1858) was an American poisoner and alleged serial killer who was executed for murdering his sister-in-law, Rhoda Wood. He is also believed to have poisoned his wife and brother, and attempted to poison his brother's two children.

== Biography ==
Isaac Wood was born in New Jersey as one of three children. At one point, his brother, David, had moved to Dansville, New York, where he had married a woman named Rhoda and had become a well-respected citizen. Isaac, who was in a dire financial situation, then moved to Dansville himself, with David helping him purchase a plot of land and even endorsing his newly founded produce speculation business.

Around June 10, 1855, while Rhoda was out of town, Isaac poisoned David, who died a few days later. While the death initially perplexed doctors, it was later pronounced as cholera morbus. After hearing this, Rhoda immediately returned home and was appointed as the owner of David's estate, jointly shared with another brother. Only a few days after, Rhoda and both of her children were struck with the same deadly symptoms. She died, but her children had managed to recover. Following this, Isaac became their parental guardian and inherited his deceased brother's estate.

However, a note supposedly written by David to Isaac was discovered in which a check for $2500 was stored. It was later revealed that the check was a forgery made by Isaac, who had changed it so that he would be the creditor and David, the debtor. Not only that, but traces of arsenic were found in a building owned by David. Suspecting that the family were deliberately poisoned, authorities dug up David and Rhoda's bodies for a medical analysis, finding large amounts of the poison in both of their stomachs.

Although Isaac was suspected of murdering the couple, by then he had travelled back with his family to New Jersey, where it was discovered that his wife had also died under suspicious circumstances back in May, allegedly due to arsenic poisoning. Police pursued Isaac for about two years. He was finally captured in January 1857, after it was discovered that he had been working as a farm laborer on a desolate prairie in Illinois.

== Trials and execution ==
Isaac was initially tried for murdering Rhoda in Genesee County court, but the jury was unable to secure a verdict. The reason was that one of the jurors, Moses Long, refused to give a verdict because of his reservations towards the death penalty. Isaac's second trial was scheduled for a later date.

While in prison, Isaac was visited and questioned by a reporter for the New York Daily Tribune. During the interview, Isaac fiercely proclaimed his innocence, claiming that he'd never done such a deed and that the state was going to execute an innocent man, saying it with such emotion that he almost cried. The reporter also noted that Isaac's tiny cell, composed of only a table and chair, had some papers on it, supposedly for the convict to write down his thoughts; it was also speculated that the mentally exhausted Isaac couldn't piece his mind together enough to write them down.

After his second trial, Isaac Wood was convicted of poisoning Rhoda and was sentenced to death. He initially tried to appeal the sentence, but the presiding judge refused the application. A crowd of around sixty persons attended his execution, including the two children he had tried to poison, as well as a Mr. Barnard, who had married Isaac's niece. During the preparation process, Isaac vehemently proclaimed his innocence and said that only God could be his judge.

When put on the scaffold, Isaac began a long speech about how mortal men made errors, but was interrupted by the Sheriff, who began reading his death warrant. After finishing, the prisoner was allowed to read three chosen scriptures from the Bible, knelt for a prayer with the preacher, gave another speech about God, and shaking hands with everyone close to him. Soon after, Isaac hung from the scaffold, finally suffocating after eight minutes. His body was put in a coffin by his sister and then transported to Avon, where sometime later it would be moved to New Jersey.

== See also ==
- List of serial killers in the United States

== Bibliography ==
- Michael Newton: The Encyclopedia of Serial Killers, 2000
