= Unwin Clarke =

Archdeacon of Chester

Unwin Clarke (22 June 1764 – 3 February 1847) was Archdeacon of Chester from 1801 until his death.

The son of Stockdell Clarke, a wealthy Cheshire land owner, Clarke was educated at Wadham College, Oxford; and was the Vicar of Neston and Eastham.
