= Isaac Wood (priest) =

Isaac Wood (11 May 1795 - 7 June 1865) was Archdeacon of Chester from his installation on 23 February 1847 until his death.

Wood was born at Davenport Hall, Astbury, Cheshire and educated at Trinity College, Cambridge. He was ordained deacon in 1818 and priest in 1819. He held the living of Middlewich for many years and is buried in the churchyard there.
