= Donald Allister =

Anglican clergyman

The Right Reverend Donald Allister
- Bishop of Peterborough
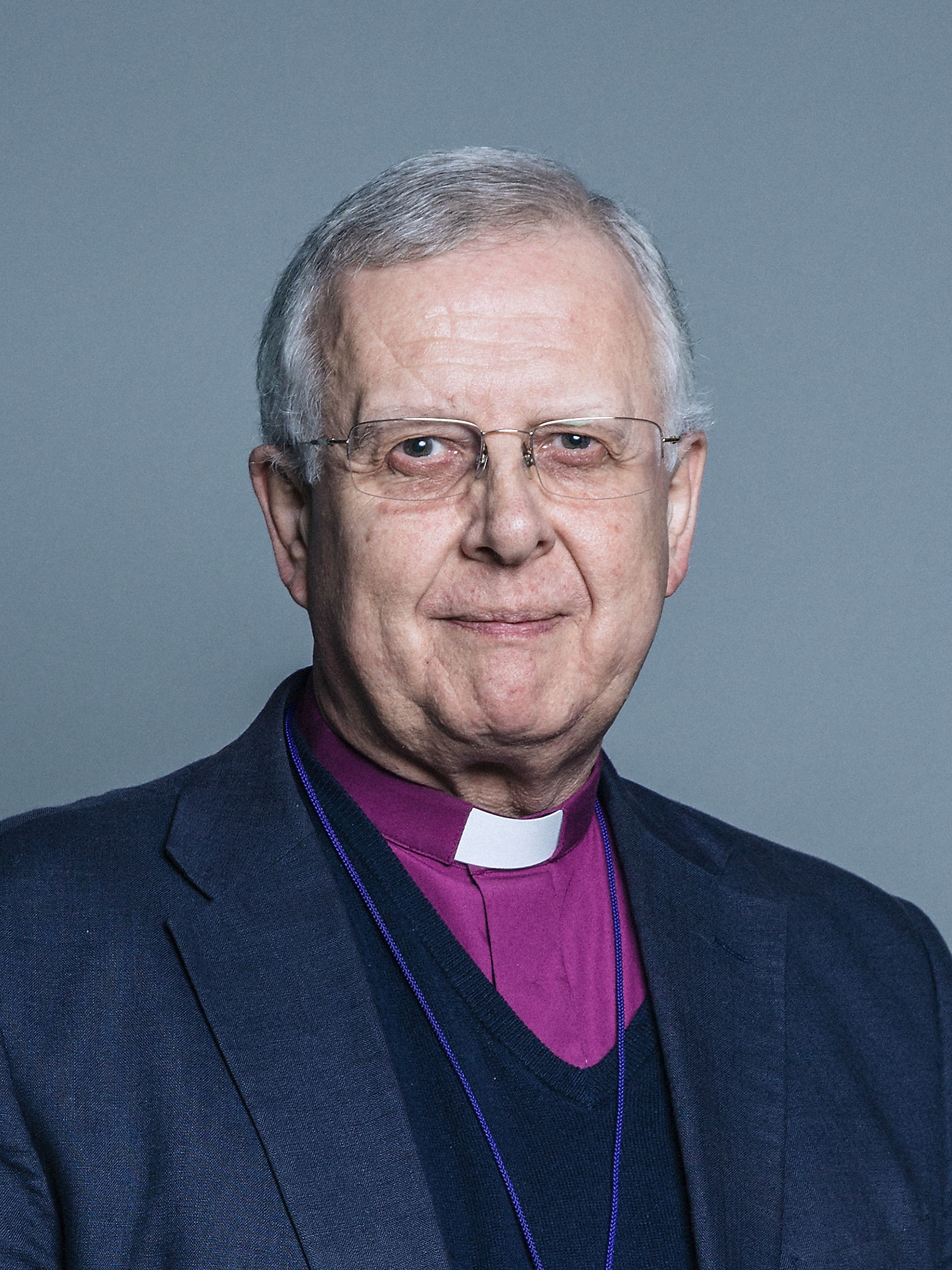
- Church: Church of England
- Diocese: Diocese of Peterborough
- Appointed: 5 November 2009
- Installed: 17 April 2010
- Term ended: 8 January 2023 (retired)
- Predecessor: Ian Cundy
- Successor: John Holbrook (acting)
- Other post: Archdeacon of Chester (2002–2010)

Orders
- Ordination: 27 June 1976 (deacon); 26 June 1977 (priest) by Victor Whitsey
- Consecration: 25 March 2010

Personal details
- Born: 27 August 1952 (age 74) Liverpool, Lancashire, United Kingdom
- Denomination: Anglican
- Spouse: Janice
- Children: 3
- Education: Peterhouse, Cambridge

Member of the House of Lords
- Lord Spiritual
- Bishop of Peterborough; 4 February 2014 – 8 January 2023

Donald Spargo Allister (born 27 August 1952) is a retired Church of England bishop who served as the Archdeacon of Chester from 2002 to 2010 and the Bishop of Peterborough from 2010 to 2023.

Allister served in parish positions in Hyde, Greater Manchester; Sevenoaks, Kent; Birkenhead, Merseyside and Cheadle, Greater Manchester. While at Sevenoaks he also served as a consultant editor of the Church of England Newspaper and was also a part-time hospital chaplain in Birkenhead. Allister has been a member of the General Synod of the Church of England since 2005 and was on the committee which drafted proposed legislation regarding the consecration of women as bishops. He is also a member of the Council for Christian Unity.

In 2001, Allister attracted media attention after it was reported that he had refused to allow a couple to have the hymns "Jerusalem" and "I Vow to Thee, My Country" at their wedding. He has also spoken out about baptising the children of unmarried couples and also on sex outside of marriage more generally.

== Early life ==
Allister was born on 27 August 1952 in Liverpool, the son of a manager of the Mersey Docks and Harbour Company and a nursing sister. The family soon moved across the Mersey to Birkenhead on the Wirral peninsula. Later, they moved to Bromley, Kent, before returning to the Wirral when they settled in Heswall, finally returning to Birkenhead where he attended Birkenhead School. In his childhood, he was a choirboy at several churches and an altar server for his uncle from whom comes his middle name of Spargo.

Allister then went up to Peterhouse, Cambridge to study medicine, later changing to theology. After graduation, he undertook further theological studies at Trinity College, Bristol.

== Ministry ==
Allister was made a deacon at Petertide 1976 (27 June) and ordained a priest the next Petertide (26 June 1977), both times by Victor Whitsey, Bishop of Chester, at Chester Cathedral. After ordination Allister served as a curate at St George's Church, Hyde from 1976 to 1979 and at St Nicholas' Church, Sevenoaks from 1979 to 1983. During this period he was also a consultant editor of the Church of England Newspaper. He was then appointed vicar of Christ Church, Birkenhead in 1983, also working as a part-time hospital chaplain.

In 1989 Allister became rector of St Mary's Church, Cheadle. He was also chairman of the Church Society, a conservative evangelical Anglican charity, from 1995 to 2000. In addition to his parish role, he became rural dean of the Cheadle deanery in 1999. In 2001 he received media coverage when it was reported that he had refused to allow a couple to have the hymns "Jerusalem" and "I Vow to Thee, My Country" sung at their wedding. He later said:

I never banned the hymn. But most people who come to be married ask for it so I do encourage them to choose something else. In this case the bride-to-be phoned the church while I was on holiday and spoke to the organist who mistakenly said the hymn was not permitted. It was blown out of all proportion.

In 2002 Allister was appointed as the Archdeacon of Chester. In this position he chaired the diocesan committees on education, houses and glebe. He also acted as the bishop's adviser on healthcare chaplaincy. He became a member of General Synod in 2005 and was appointed to the commission drafting legislation relating to the possible consecration of women as bishops in 2006, serving until it delivered its proposals in 2008.

On 5 November 2009 it was announced from 10 Downing Street that Allister had been nominated as the next Bishop of Peterborough. The see had become vacant with the death of Ian Cundy in May 2009. The announcement was followed by a press conference in Peterborough. The Congé d'Elire officially authorising his election as bishop was issued by Elizabeth II on 1 December 2009. He was consecrated as a bishop in St Paul's Cathedral on 25 March 2010 and was enthroned as Bishop of Peterborough in Peterborough Cathedral on 17 April 2010.

On 4 February 2014, Allister was admitted to the House of Lords as a Lord Spiritual.

On 4 November 2011, he was awarded an honorary doctorate in theology by the University of Chester "in recognition of his outstanding contribution to the promotion of Christian education".

On 3 July 2022, Allister announced his intention to retire (resigning his see) in January 2023. He officially retired on 8 January 2023.

=== Views ===
Allister had previously refused to baptise the children of unmarried parents and condemned sex outside marriage.

In 1993, in an essay in which he identified as a conservative evangelical, he wrote "Liberalism is one of Satan's greatest weapons against the church." He attributed the fire at York Minster in 1984, the fire at Windsor Castle in 1992, and "the disastrous royal marriage saga of last year" (a reference to the separation of Charles, Prince of Wales from Diana, Princess of Wales in 1992), to the judgment of God.

In 1993, he set out a complementarian view of the role of women: i.e., the "distinctions between men and women in church, society and home". The Synod of the Church of England had voted to allow the ordination of women as priests in 1993. As such, he made the following statement concerning the ordination of women:

There is a difficult judgment to be made as to whether the clear biblical prohibition on women exercising headship, teaching authority, in the church means they cannot be presbyters. I respect the view that they can-provided that it goes on to say that women cannot be incumbents.

In 1999, Allister objected to the admission of children to Holy Communion before confirmation. He also stated that "Infant baptism only signifies God's grace, not the child's response. It is therefore incomplete, partial or provisional initiation."

Allister later changed his mind about the ordination of women. In 2009, following the announcement that he would be the next Bishop of Peterborough, he stated that he "would ordain women as priests" and "would happily serve with or under a woman bishop". However, he also called for those who object to the ordination of women to be "treated in a way that allows them to stay in the Church with integrity.”

When his appointment as Bishop of Peterborough was announced in 2009, the diocesan website stated that "his views have changed over the years and that, like all Christians, he is on a faith-journey. He remains conservative in matters of doctrine and ethics". He was quoted saying "Today, I'm happy to attend and lead worship in churches of all traditions, from Anglo-Catholic to New Wine ... I love the Church of England in all its variety".

== Personal life ==
Allister is married to Janice, a general practitioner and they have three children: their son, John, is now a vicar in Nottingham.

== Styles ==
- The Reverend Donald Allister (1976–2002)
- The Venerable Donald Allister (2002–2010)
- The Right Reverend Donald Allister (2010–present)

Church of England titles
Preceded by Ian Cundy	Bishop of Peterborough; 2010–2023	Succeeded by Debbie Sellin
