= List of works by Thomas Lockwood =

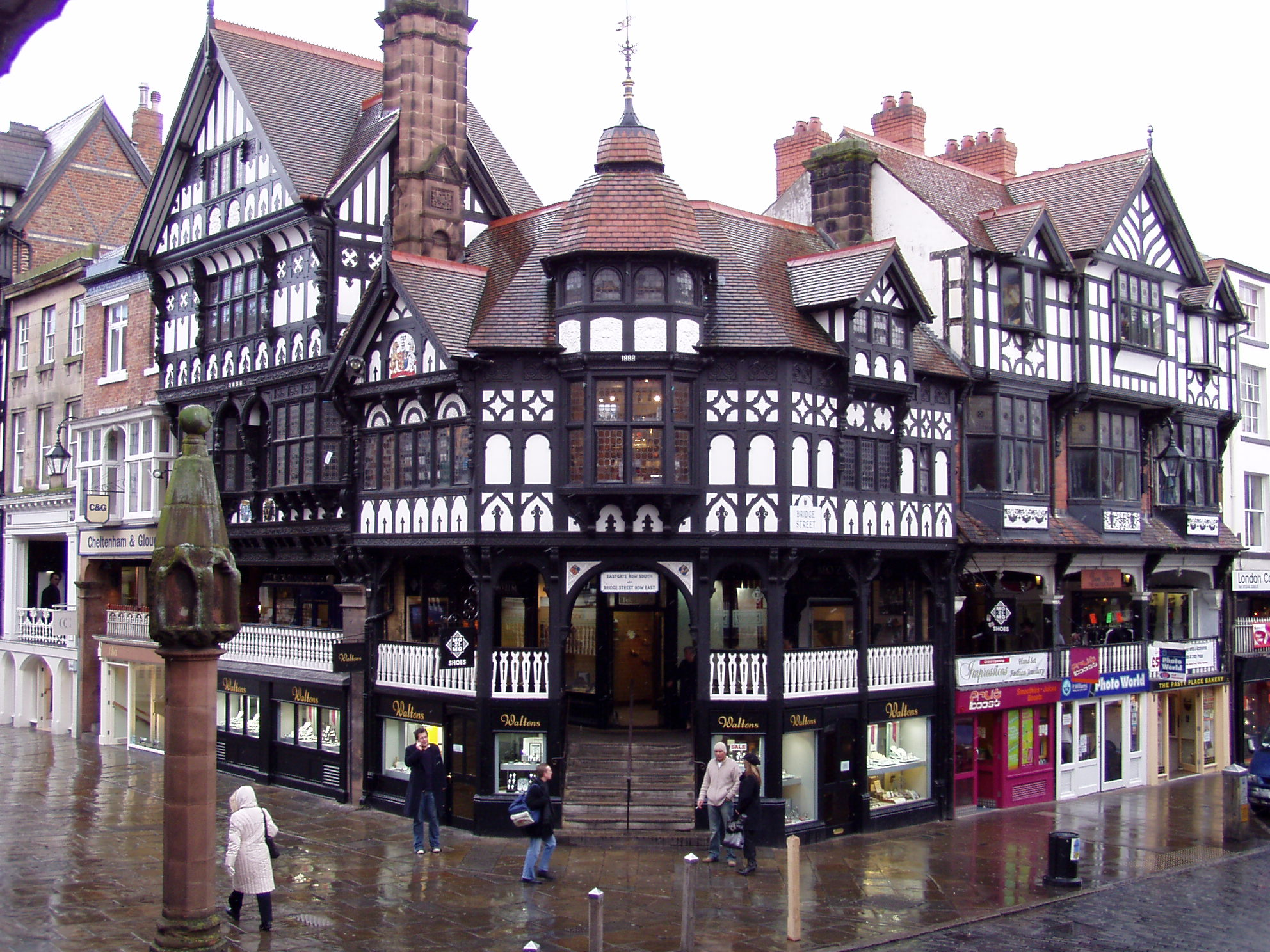
1 Bridge Street, Chester

Thomas Meakin Lockwood (1830–1900) was an English architect whose main works are in and around Chester, Cheshire. He was born in London, and brought up in East Anglia. He trained in Chester with T. M. Penson, then established his own independent practice in the city in about 1860. His most important patron was the First Duke of Westminster. His sons W. T. and P. H. Lockwood joined him as partners in the practice in 1892. According to the architectural historian Edward Hubbard he is the only 19th-century Chester architect, other than John Douglas, to have acquired a national reputation. A memorial window to his memory is in the north aisle of St John the Baptist's Church, Chester.

== Key ==
Grade	Criteria
Grade I	Buildings of exceptional interest, sometimes considered to be internationally important.
Grade II*	Particularly important buildings of more than special interest.
Grade II	Buildings of national importance and special interest.
"—" denotes a work that is not graded.

== Works ==
Name	Location	Photograph	Date	Notes	Grade
Presbyterian Church	Holt, Wrexham, Wales; 53.0783°N 2.8837°W		1865		II
School	Harthill, Cheshire; 53.0923°N 2.7461°W		1868	For Robert Barbour.	
Town Hall	Whitchurch, Shropshire		1872	Replaced by a civic centre,	
Independent Chapel; Cecil Street	Chester, Cheshire; 53.1918°N 2.8683°W		1872–75		
20 Bridge Street	Chester, Cheshire; 53.1897°N 2.8916°W		1873	Timber-framed.	II
5–7 Eastgate Street	Chester, Cheshire; 53.1905°N 2.8910°W		1874	Timber-framed with brick infill.	
Northgate Church	Chester, Cheshire; 53.1958°N 2.8946°W		1874–75	Built as a Congregational church, with a stone front and brick sides.	II
Court No. 2 Chester Castle	Chester, Cheshire; 53.1858°N 2.8913°W		1875–76		
Boathouse	Chester, Cheshire; 53.1888°N 2.8823°W		1877	For the Grosvenor Rowing Club.	II
Police Station	Mold, Flintshire, Wales		1881		
The Red House	Hawarden, Flintshire, Wales		1883	For W. H. Gladstone. Since demolished.	
Whitefriars Lodge	Chester, Cheshire; 53.1887°N 2.8920°W		1885		II
Grosvenor Museum	Chester, Cheshire; 53.1873°N 2.8924°W		1885–86	The land and a donation of £4,000 (equivalent to £380,000 in 2025) were given by the First Duke of Westminster.	II
39 Kennedy Road	Shrewsbury, Shropshire		1885–86		
3 Upper Northgate Street	Chester, Cheshire; 53.1943°N 2.8937°W		1886	Town house.	II
The Cumbers	Hanmer, Wrexham, Wales; 52.9495°N 2.8299°W		1887–88	A country house.	
1 Bridge Street	Chester, Cheshire; 53.1902°N 2.8915°W		1888	Built for the First Duke of Westminster.	II*
2–4 Eastgate Street	Chester, Cheshire; 53.1902°N 2.8914°W		1888	Rebuilding of a medieval structure for the First Duke of Westminster.	II*
31 Eastgate Street	Chester, Cheshire; 53.1907°N 2.8900°W		1889	Tall timber-framed shop.	
24–26 Commonhall Street	Chester, Cheshire53.1893°N 2.8931°W		1889	A pair of cottages for the staff of Browns of Chester.	II
Park Hall	Oswestry, Shropshire		1889	Extension of a timber-framed house built in about 1600. It was burnt down in 1910, A lodge designed by Lockwood remains by the A495 road.	
2–5 Old Hall Place	Chester, Cheshire53.1896°N 2.8930°W		c. 1899	A row of four cottages for the staff of Browns of Chester.	II
Hawarden Gymnasium	Hawarden, Flintshire, Wales		1891		
2 City Road	Chester, Cheshire; 53.1923°N 2.8818°W		1892	Originally a bank, later offices.	II
St Mark's Church	Saltney, Chester, Cheshire; 53.1791°N 2.9151°W		1892–93	A simple brick church.	II
2–8 Bridge Street, 1–3 Watergate Street	Chester, Cheshire; 53.1902°N 2.8918°W		1894	Built for the First Duke of Westminster.	II*
Campbell Memorial Hall	Chester, Cheshire; 53.1919°N 2.8721°W		1894–97	Built as a church hall and caretaker's cottage for St Paul's Church, Boughton in brick with half-timbered gables. The east entrance to the hall is listed separately.	II
Old Bank Buildings; 2–6 Foregate Street	Chester, Cheshire; 53.1908°N 2.8887°W		1895	Timber-framed and brick.	II
Boys' Club	Chester, Cheshire; 53.1826°N 2.8884°W		1895	Built as a working men's institute for the First Duke of Westminster.	II
38–48 Park Road	Port Sunlight, Wirral, Merseyside; 53.3507°N 2.9947°W		1895	Terrace of six houses.	II
Organ case, St John the Baptist's Church	Chester, Cheshire; 53.1890°N 2.8856°W		1895		
10–18 Foregate Street	Chester, Cheshire; 53.1909°N 2.8881°W		1896	The east part was extended in 1911 by W. T. Lockwood.	II
Rectory	Eccleston, Cheshire; 53.1590°N 2.8804°W		c. 1896		
Lloyds Bank; 8 Foregate Street	Chester, Cheshire; 53.1908°N 2.8884°W		1897	Extension to the south of a bank built in 1793–1803.	II
Rectory	Aldford, Cheshire; 53.1286°N 2.8692°W		1897		
Chester Town Hall	Chester, Cheshire; 53.1918°N 2.8927°W		1898	Internal alterations following a fire of 1897.	II*
81–87 Bebington Road	Port Sunlight, Wirral, Merseyside; 53.3583°N 3.0006°W		1899	Terrace of four houses.	II
Bishop Lloyd's House	Chester, Cheshire; 53.1899°N 2.8934°W		c. 1899	Extensive restoration of two timber-framed houses.	I
9–15 Eastgate Street	Chester, Cheshire; 53.1905°N 2.8908°W		1900	Large symmetrical building with a turret at each end.	
4–10 City Road	Chester, Cheshire; 53.1925°N 2.8817°W		Undated		II
