= Chester Cross =

Chester Cross may refer to:

- Chester Cross (junction), a staggered crossroads in the centre of Chester, Cheshire, England
- Chester High Cross, a reconstructed medieval cross standing in the junction
