= Black-and-white Revival architecture =

Revival of vernacular architecture

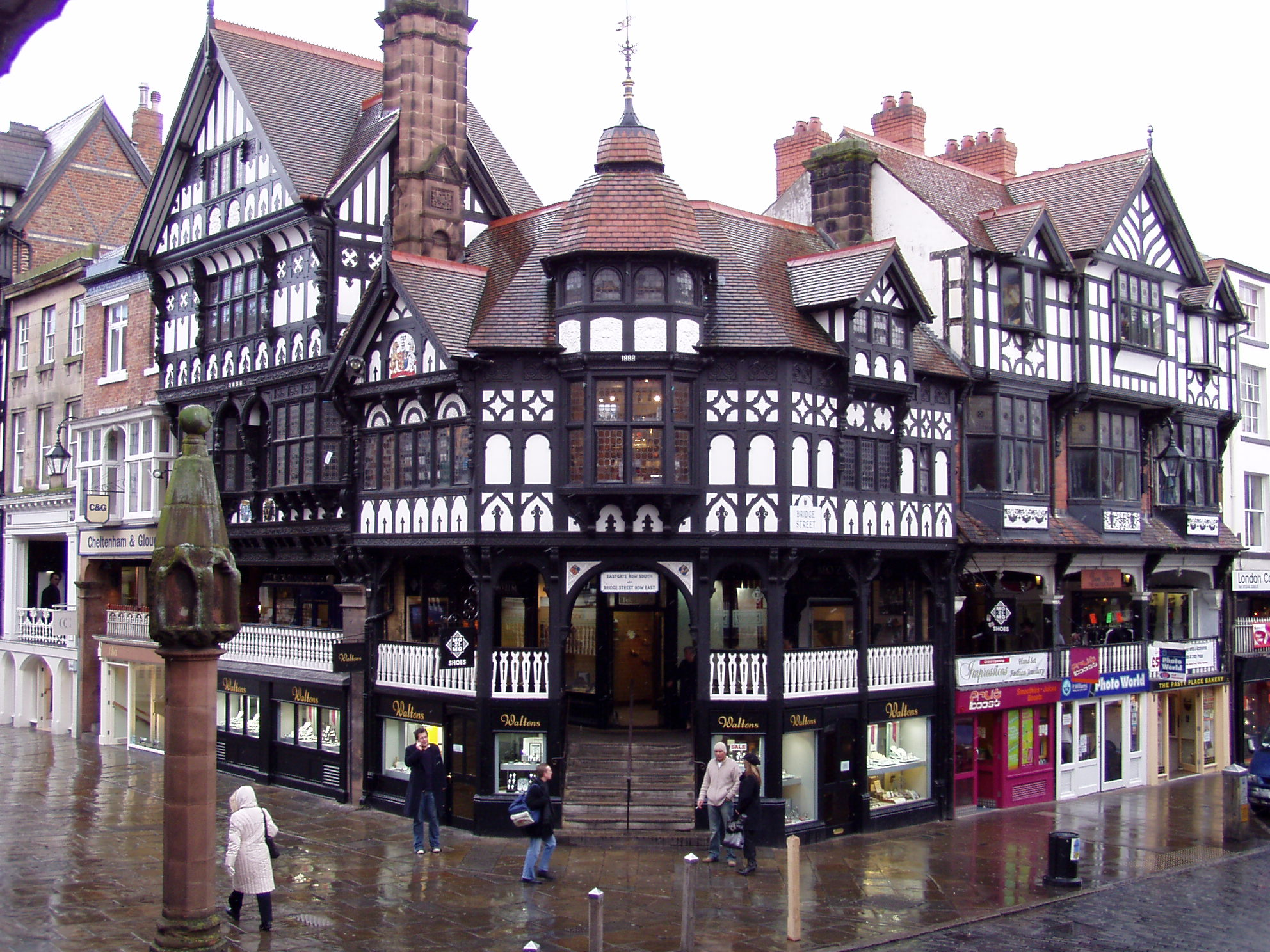
Lockwood's black-and-white building at Chester Cross

The Black-and-white Revival was a mid-19th-century architectural movement that revived historical vernacular elements with timber framing. The wooden framing is painted black and the panels between the frames are painted white. The style was part of a wider Tudor Revival in 19th-century architecture.

Nikolaus Pevsner describes the movement as a "Cheshire speciality", but states that it was not created in Cheshire and is not confined to the county. The earliest example noted by Pevsner is the Henry VII Lodge in Woburn Sands, Bedfordshire, built in 1811. The other example he gives is the Court House in Worsley, which was built in 1849. The first Cheshire architect to be involved in the movement was T. M. Penson, who restored the house at No. 22 Eastgate Street, Chester, in 1852 in the black-and-white style. This was followed by his further restorations in Eastgate Street, at Nos. 34–36 in 1856, and No. 26 in 1858. However, Pevsner considers that Penson's works were "moderate in size and not very knowledgeable in detail".

The movement was improved when John Douglas and T. M. Lockwood "discovered the medium". They were the principal architects of the movement, and they "transformed the street frontages of the city with their black and white buildings". Major examples of their work are Lockwood's building opposite Chester Cross at No. 1 Bridge Street of 1888 and the terrace of buildings on the east side of St Werburgh Street of 1895–99 by Douglas. The black-and-white tradition in Chester continued into the 20th century.
