= 1 Bridge Street, Chester =

1 Bridge Street
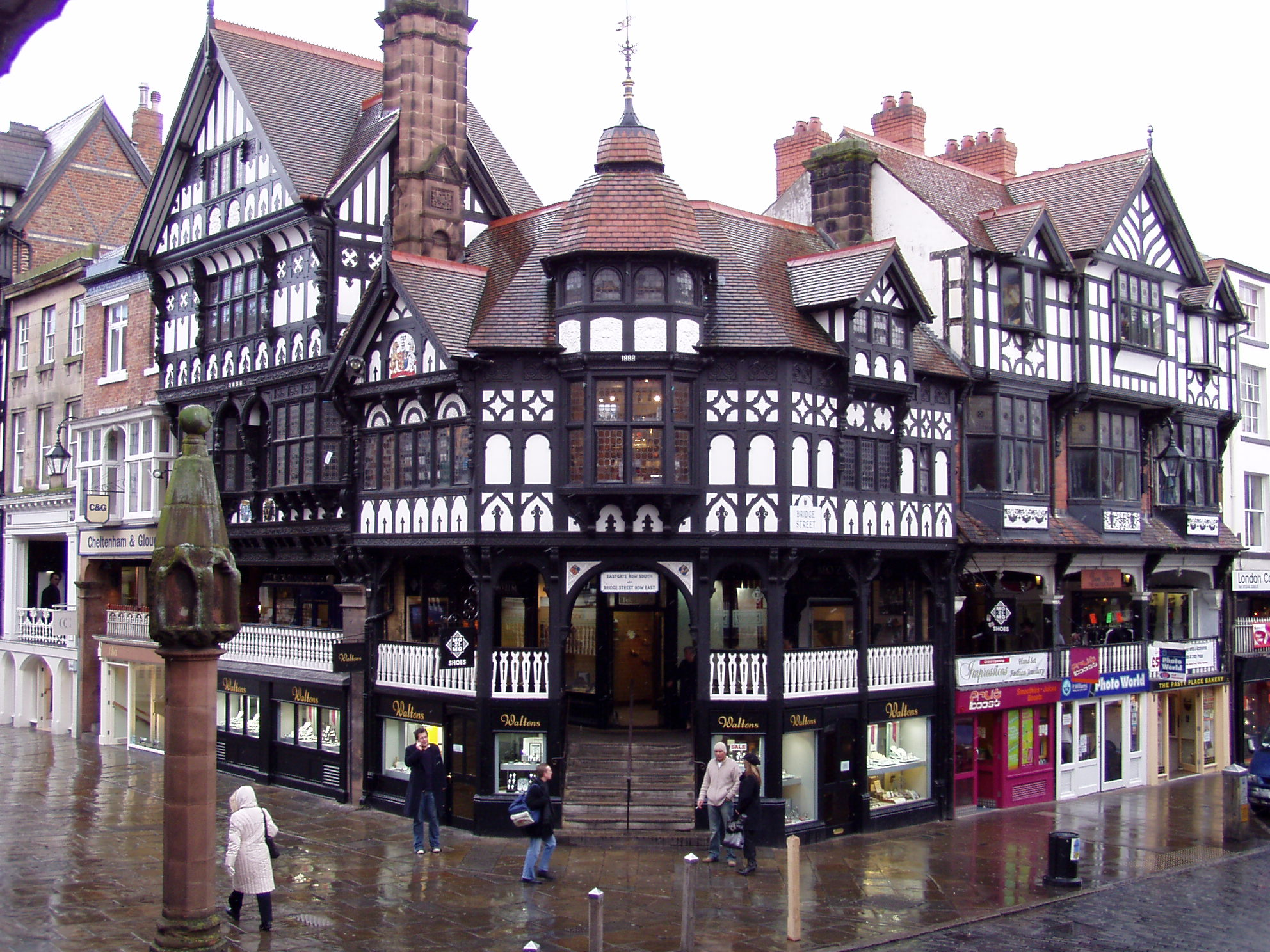

- Location in Cheshire
- 53.1902°N 2.8915°W
- Location: Bridge Street, Chester, Cheshire, England

History
- Built: 1888
- Built for: 1st Duke of Westminster

Site notes
- Architect: Thomas Lockwood
- Architectural style: Black-and-white revival

Listed Building – Grade II*
- Official name: No.1 Street and No.1 Row, Chester
- Designated: 10 January 1972
- Reference no.: 1376055

1 Bridge Street is located at the junction of Bridge Street and Eastgate Street at Chester Cross in the centre of the city of Chester, Cheshire, England. Its architecture is that of the black-and-white revival, it incorporates part of the Chester Rows, and is recorded in the National Heritage List for England as a designated Grade II* listed building. Because of its prominent position and its black-and-white architecture, the historian Simon Ward has described it as an "iconic" building.

== History ==
The building was designed by Thomas Lockwood, and built in 1888 for the 1st Duke of Westminster, although by 1889 it was owned by Chester City Council. The building is now occupied by shops. The citation in the National Heritage List describes the building as "the best liked of T. M. Lockwood's buildings in Chester, well executed in his most flamboyant style".

== Architecture ==
The building is in four storeys, including an undercroft, whose floor is below street level, and an attic. It extends for one bay down Bridge Street and for one bay along Eastgate Street. At its corner is a flight of seven steps leading from the street to the row level above which is an octagonal turret. Above the steps is a canted, mullioned and transomed, oriel window. Over this are three pargetted panels under a four-light canted casement window. The roof is curved and surmounted by a weather vane.

On each side of the steps at street level are modern shop fronts. Above these, at the front of the Rows, are balustrades behind which are sloping stall boards, then the walkway and shop fronts. On Bridge Street at the third storey level are decorative panels and a three-light window. Above this is a gabled dormer with more panels and another three-light window. On Eastgate Street at the third storey is a six-light window with panels above and below. There is again a dormer with panels, one of which includes the arms of the Grosvenor family.

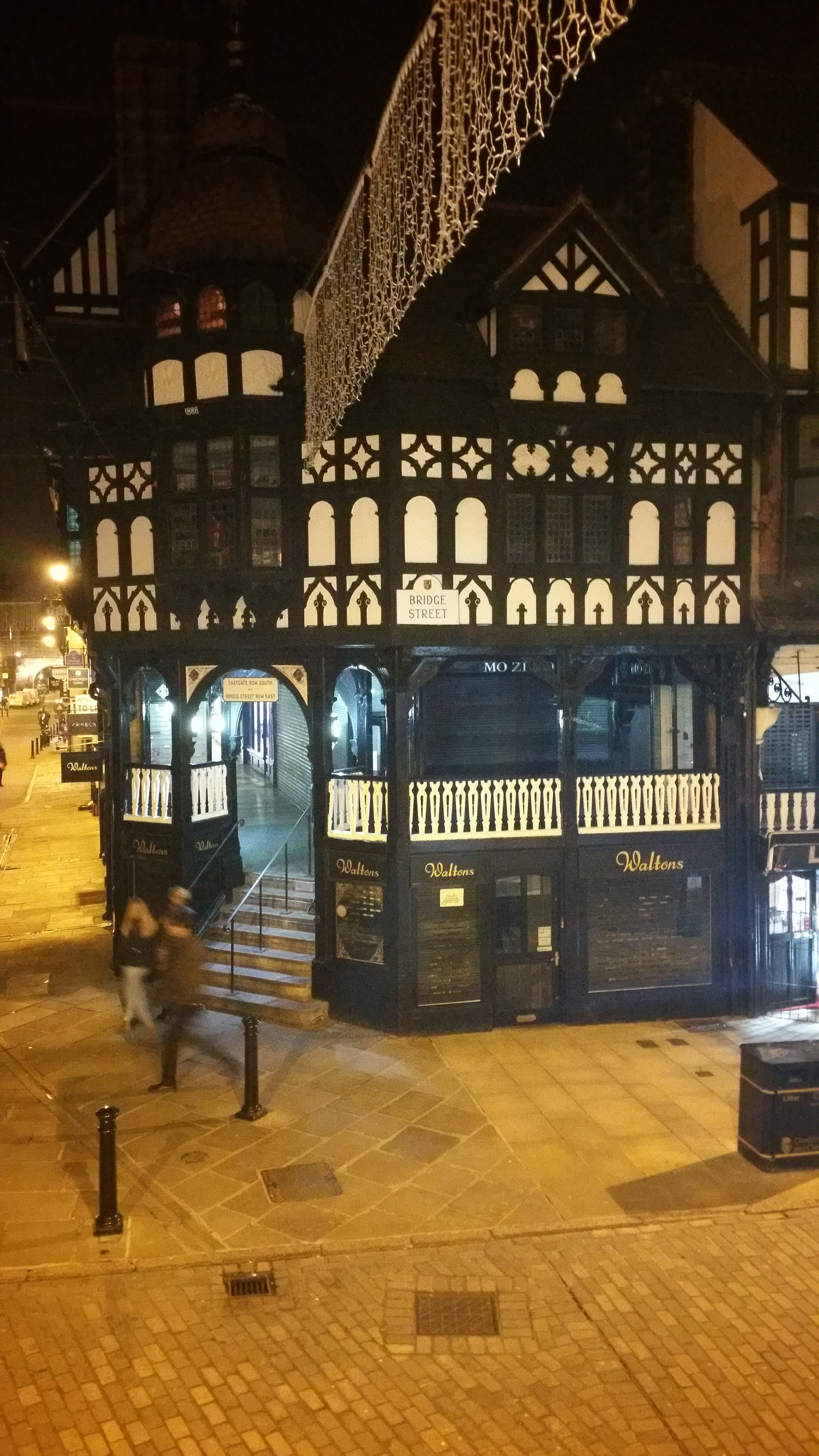
1 Bridge Street, Chester, Cheshire

== See also ==
- Grade II* listed buildings in Cheshire
- List of works by Thomas Lockwood
