= Northgate Church, Chester =

Coordinates: 53.1958°N 2.8946°W

- Northgate Church, Chester, in 2026

- Location in Cheshire
- OS grid reference: SJ 404 669
- Location: Upper Northgate Street, Chester, Cheshire
- Country: England
- Denomination: Independent
- Website: Northgate Church

Architecture
- Functional status: Active
- Heritage designation: Grade II
- Designated: 23 July 1998
- Architect: T. M. Lockwood
- Architectural type: Church
- Style: Gothic Revival
- Completed: 1874

Specifications
- Materials: Sandstone and brick Slate roofs

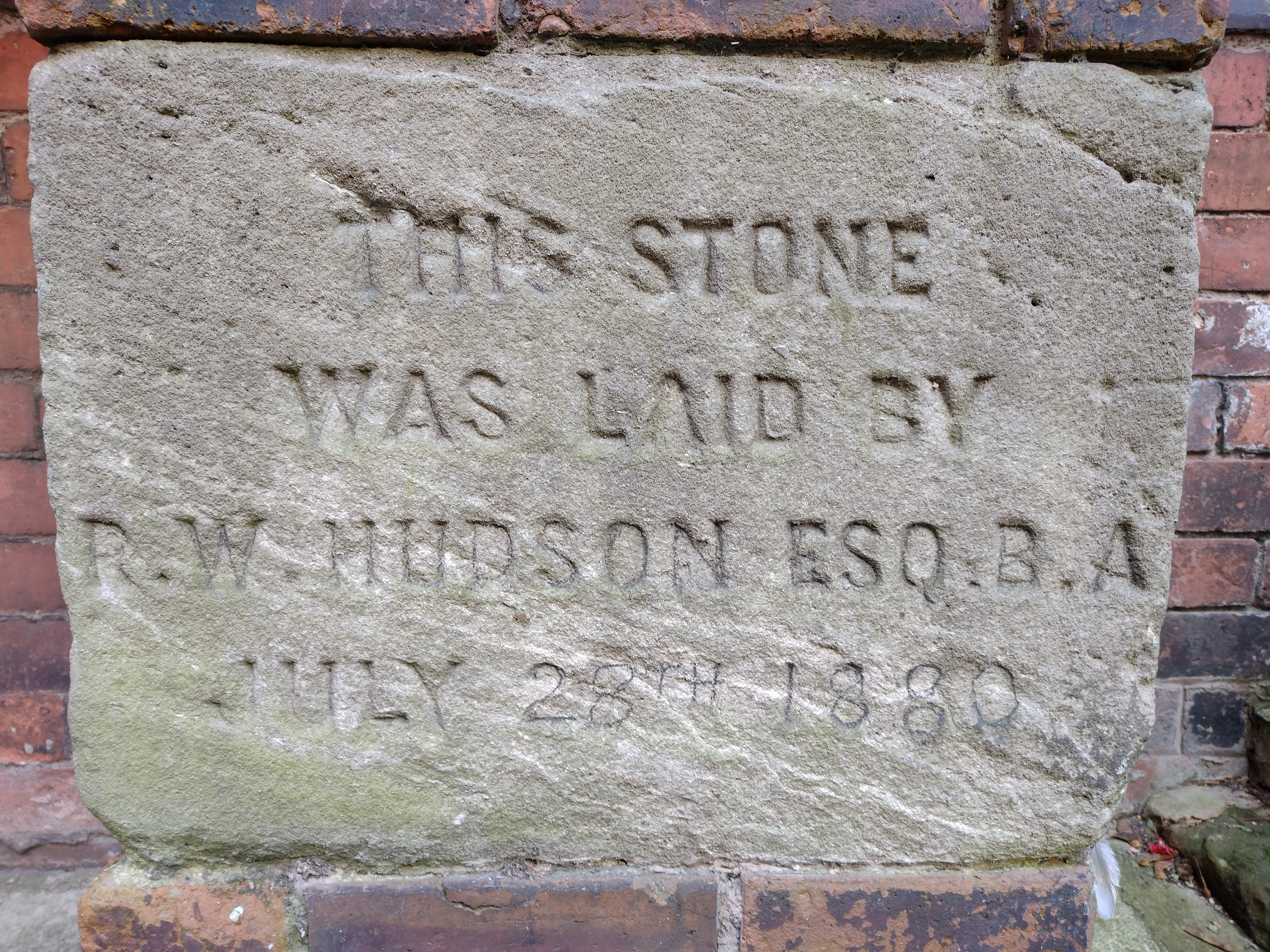
NGC Sunday School foundation stone

Northgate Church, Chester, is located in Upper Northgate Street, Chester, Cheshire, England.

== History of the building ==
It was originally built in 1874 as a Congregational church, and was designed by the local architect T.M. Lockwood. The foundation stone was laid on 23rd July 1874 by the Hon. John George Dodson, M.P. for Chester. It was opened on 22nd July 1875, with the Rev. Alexander Thomson (Chairman of the Congregational Union of England and Wales) preaching. It remained in Congregational hands until 1967. It was used for a time by Chester College (now Chester University). The building was bought in 1979 by its current congregation, Northgate Church.

== Architecture ==
The church is constructed with a front in Storeton Hill sandstone, and the sides and rear in brick. The roof is slated. It is described by the authors of the Buildings of England series as "quite a landmark". Standing on the highest ground in Chester city centre, its spire (28m/92ft) is visible from many parts of the city. The church is recorded in the National Heritage List for England as a designated Grade II listed building.

== Sunday School ==
A second building was constructed behind the church to serve as a Sunday School. A foundation stone reads, "This stone was laid by R.W. Hudson, Esq. B.A. July 28th 1880" Robert William Hudson was a local soap manufacturer and philanthropist.

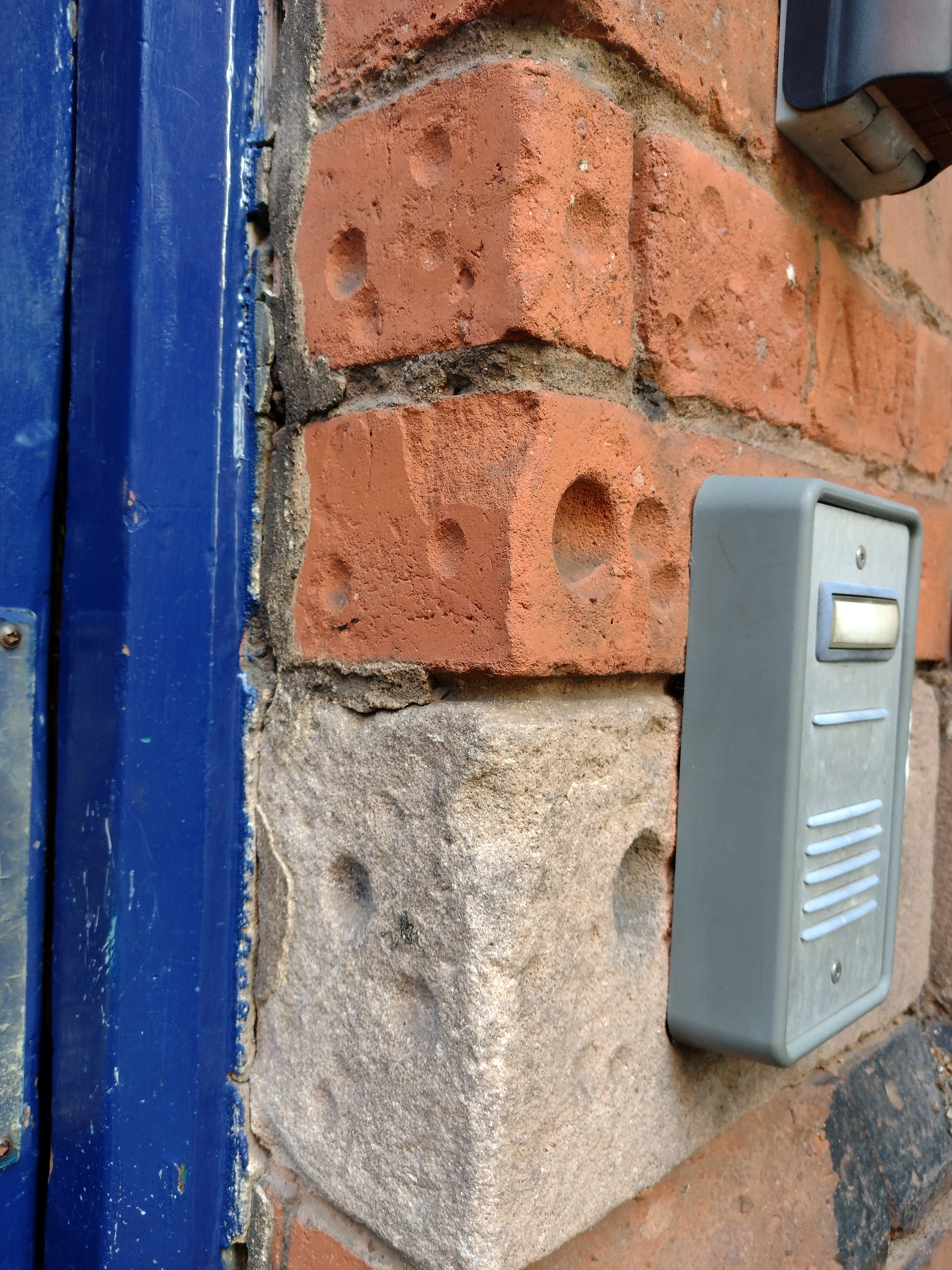
Holes bored in the walls by children queuing for the Sunday School using pennies, halfpennies and farthings

A curious feature of the building is the circular holes made by queuing children, who bored into the soft brick and stone with their pennies, halfpennies and farthings (pictured below).

== See also ==
- Grade II listed buildings in Chester (north and west)
