= Peter Bressan =

French woodwind instrument maker

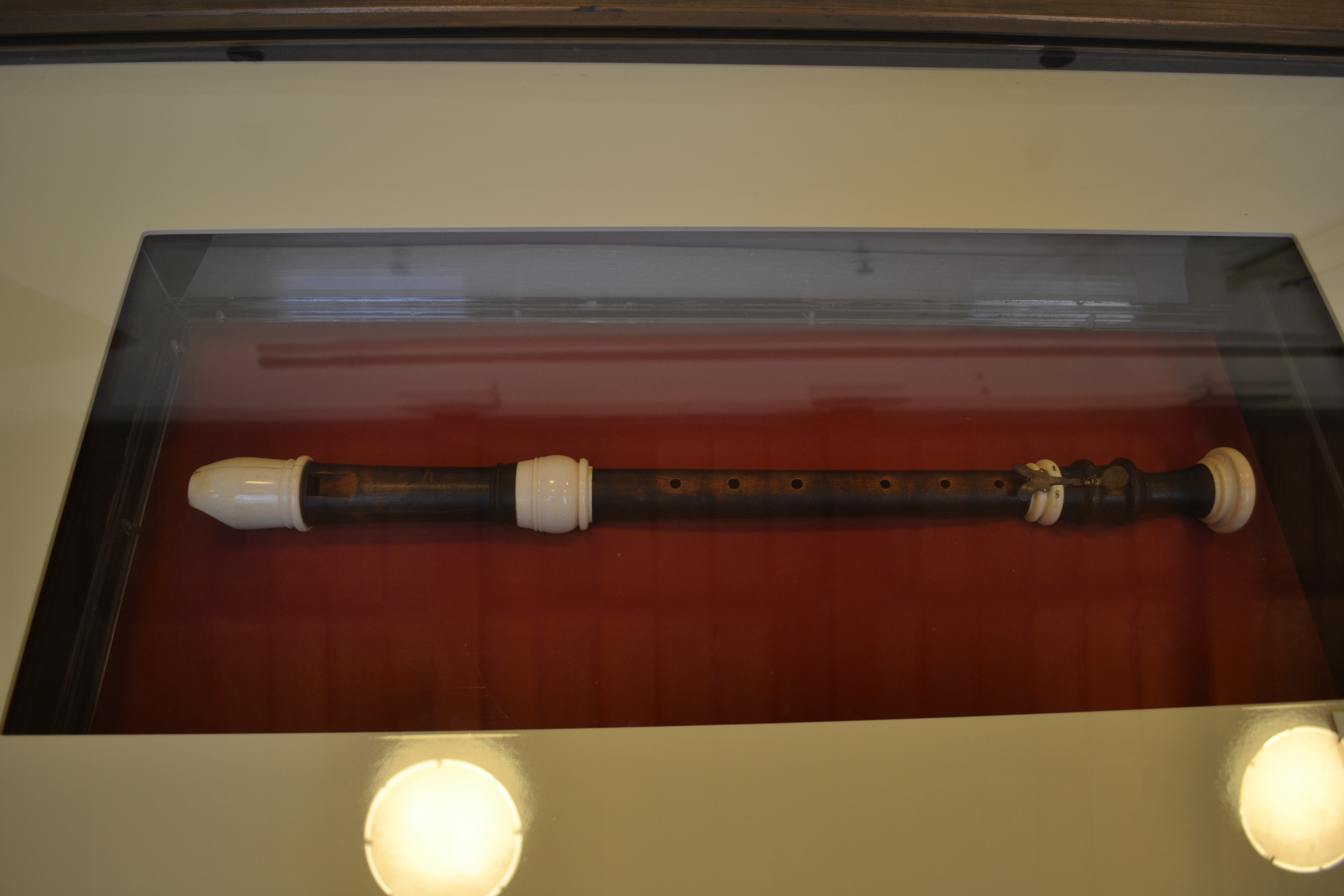
A tenor recorder made by Peter Bressan, exhibited in the Museum of Musical Instruments in Sforza Castle in Milan.

Peter Bressan (1663 - 1731) was a noted woodwind instrument maker of whose work several examples exist in museums and private collections.

== Life ==
Peter Bressan was born as Pierre Jaillard in Bourg-en-Bresse, France, May 27, 1663 and died April 21,1732 in Tournai, Belgium. Pierre was probably educated at the College in Bourg until he was apprenticed for two years to Jean Boysser a master turner at the age of fifteen. It is not known where he learned his instrument making skills but it is surmised that he may have studied under the Hotteterres in Paris.

In 1691 Pierre was recorded as having played the hautboy (oboe) for William III of England. Subsequently, there are a number of references to him by authors of the time and later as a maker and seller of musical instruments including recorders, voice flutes, flutes, oboes and bassoons.

At some point he changed his surname to Bressan; possibly because 'Jaillard' proved hard for the English to pronounce.

His workshop and home was located in Dutchy House, in part of the old Savoy Palace in London. This part of London had a rich history and for many years had sheltered foreigners and especially French nationals. Bressan arrived in England in 1688, had made a fortune by the time of his marriage in 1703. He and his wife Mary Margaret had ten children but only four survived to adulthood. His trade had fallen off by 1713 perhaps due to the decline in popularity of the recorder. His substantial fortune was diminished by litigation, by the extravagance of his wife, and especially by their involvement in the financial crash of the South Sea Bubble in 1720. He became naturalised in 1723. Bressan died in 1731 while living alone in Tournai, Belgium. His will shows him to have been relatively well off, as it includes paintings, busts and many musical instruments.

== Work ==
Surviving instruments by Bressan include 51 recorders and 4 transverse flutes. The recorders comprise one descant, 27 trebles, 13 voice flutes, 12 tenors and six bassets, or bass recorders. Except for the bassets, most are scaled in total external length in an exact ratio to the treble: 4th flute 3/4, voice flute 6/5, and tenor flute 4/3. Two of his transverse flutes have an earlier style single centre joint and one with four joints is unusually decorated with silver piqué (possibly the work of Peter Simon, Bressan's brother-in-law, a silversmith). No examples of his oboes or bassoons are known to exist.

The Grosvenor Museum in Chester has six of his recorders, four of which form a matched set always kept together as a recorder consort or quartet consisting of a soprano in F4 of 20 inches, an alto in D4 of 24 inches, a tenor in C4 of 26¾ inches and a bass in F3 of 42½ inches. This quartet belonged to the Cholmondeley family of Cheshire and was found in an attic around 1845. It was given to the Chester and North Wales Archaeological Society whose collections later passed into the ownership of the Grosvenor Museum. The Dayton Miller collection of flutes and other wind instruments in the Library of Congress, Washington, has 5 recorders by Bressan, illustrated in high definition photographs on their website. The Bate Collection in Oxford has a well known example of an alto recorder on which a number of modern copies have been based, as well as a bass recorder which can be heard playing together on a YouTube video. The recorder player Frans Brüggen had a collection of historical instruments amongst which are a number of original Bressans, including the voice flute. The instruments are finely made usually in boxwood or fruitwood and decorated with ivory rings. Three surviving bass recorders, found in the Victoria and Albert Museum, London, the Grosvenor museum, Chester and St Peter Hungate, Norwich are described with their measurements and compared to those of lost bass recorder by Bressan described by James Talbot in a Christ Church, Oxford manuscript of 1640.

== Legacy ==
Bressan's surviving instruments are of renowned quality and have inspired a number of reproduction instruments. Comparisons of the existing recorders have been made by Bouterse, including notes on how to replicate them and the problems of re-scaling the copies so that they can be played at the modern concert pitch standards of A=440 or A=415 hertz. Zen-On makes two plastic versions of an alto by Bressan, one scaled to play at A=440 hertz, and one at A=415.
