= World's oldest architectural practices continuously operating =

This article lists the oldest extant architectural practices in the world. Very few architectural practices are still operating whose foundation pre-dates the beginning of the 20th century and it would not be unreasonable to conclude that any practice that was founded in the 18th or 19th centuries should be listed as amongst the oldest surviving architectural firms around the globe. In order to qualify for the list a practice must:

- be predominantly an architectural practice, designing and constructing buildings and like structures
- be registered in their home territory as architects or architectural designers
- be operating continuously from the date of foundation, albeit a change of names or ownership is likely over intervening centuries
- be evidenced by relevant authoritative sources

== 18th century ==
Date Founded	Country	Architectural Practice	Founded by (if known)	Notes
1750	England	Brierley Groom	John Carr (architect)	Founded By John Carr; then run by Walter Henry Brierley in the late 19th C; thence to father and sons, the Groom family from the 3rd quarter of the 20th C

== 19th century ==
Date Founded	Country	Architectural Practice	Founded by (if known)	Notes
1834	England	Hadfield Cawkwell Davidson	Matthew Ellison Hadfield	
1850	Scotland	Muir Walker Pride Chartered Architects	Jesse Hall (architect)	Founded By Jesse Hall; then run by David Henry in the 19th C; thence to new partners, thence to the Muir family from 2011.
1853	Australia	Bates Smart	Joseph Reed	The firm has changed its name multiple times over the years. Joseph Reed (1853), Reed & Barnes (1862), Reed, Henderson & Smart (1883), Reed, Smart & Tappin (1890), Smart, Tappin & Peebles (1906), Bates, Peebles & Smart (1907), Bates & Smart (1922) Bates, Smart & McCutcheon (1926), Bates Smart (1995)
1853	USA	Luckett & Farley	Henry Whitestone	The firm began under the name Rogers, Whitestone & Co., Architects, changing its name to Henry Whitestone in 1857, to D.X. Murphy & Brother in 1890, and to Luckett & Farley in 1962.
1853	USA	SmithGroup	Sheldon Smith	Founded as Sheldon Smith, the firm's name was changed to Field, Hinchman & Smith in 1903; then renamed Smith, Hinchman & Grylls in 1907; in 2000, the firm changed its name to SmithGroup.
1856	England	Edgington, Spink & Hyne	Thomas Edgington	Founded as Edgington & Son; thence Edgington & Spink from 1907; thence Edgington Spink & Hyne from 1955
1860	England	Lovelock Mitchell Architects	T.M. Lockwood	Founded by Thomas Lockwood in 1860, becoming Lockwood & Sons in 1892, then Lockwood Abercrombie & Saxon in 1922, then Saxon Smith & Partners in 1947, then Saxon Smith Lovelock Mitchell in 1972, then Lovelock Mitchell & Partners from 1975. Today operates as Lovelock Mitchell Architects, an employee-owned trust.
1863	New Zealand	Mason & Wales	William Mason	Founded by William Mason with William Clayton in partnership as Mason & Clayton; thence joined in partnership by Nathaniel Wales by 1871; thence by the latter's son PY Wales and his grandson NYA Wales; and then his great-grandson Niel YA Wales from 1956; thence to Ashley Muir from 1970 and his son, Hamish Muir and his business partner Francis Whitaker, as of today
1868	USA	King + King Architects	Archimedes Russell	In 1906 it was called Melvin L. King Architects; then in 1932 it changed to Melvin L. & Harry A. King Architects when Harry King became a partner; n 1945, it changed to Melvin L., Harry A. & Curtis King Architects when Curtis King became a partner, and in 1959 Russell King became a partner — changing the firm's name to King & King Architects.
1879	England	Gotch Saunders &Surrridge		
1884	England	Caroe & Partners	William Douglas Caröe	
1884	Australia	Wilson	Alex B Wilson	Founded by Alex B Wilson, later joined by his grandson and his wife Blair & Beth Wilson by 1971; thence run by their son, Hamilton from 1995
1887	Singapore	Swan & Maclaren	Archibald Alexander Swan & Alfred Lermit	Founded by Swan & Lermit as surveyors/engineers; thence, joined by James Wadell Boyd Maclaren in 1892 as Swan & Maclaren; Regent Alfred John Bidwell joined as architect partner in 1897 till 1915; thence to successor partners
1889	USA	Cram and Ferguson Architects	Ralph Adams Cram and Charles Francis Wentworth	Founded as Cram and Wentworth 1889, Joined by Bertram Grosvenor Goodhue (1890), Frank Ferguson on the death of Wentworth (1899) hence Cram, Goodhue and Ferguson until 1914 then Cram and Ferguson Architects and Successors through the present Cramand Ferguson Architects, Boston.
1892	England	Tooley Foster	Herbert Tooley	The Practice was founded in 1892 by Herbert Tooley and then later Reginald "Rex" Foster joined as Partner in 1910. The Practice was known as The Tooley & Foster Partnership for over a century and in 2022 changed to just Tooley Foster. The Practice has always been based in Buckhurst Hill, Essex.
1895	England	Stedman Blower	Arthur Stedman	Founded as AJ Stedman, Architect & Surveyor; thence AJ & LR Stedman Architects from 1940; thence Stedman & Blower Architects from 1964; thence Stedman Blower Architects from 1995
1897	Scotland	AB Roger & Young	D.Wishart Galloway	AB Roger & Young is an architectural practice based in Brechin, Angus, Scotland. The firm traces its origins to 1897, founded by D. Wishart Galloway. The present name was adopted in 1965 when Alexander B. Roger and Peter Young became partners. It continues to operate under current directors Ashleigh Wilson and Stephen Pirie.
