= Thomas Meakin Lockwood =

British architect (1830–1900)

- Born: 1830; London, England
- Died: 15 July 1900 (aged 69–70)
- Occupation: Architect
- Relatives: Thomas William Lockwood (son)

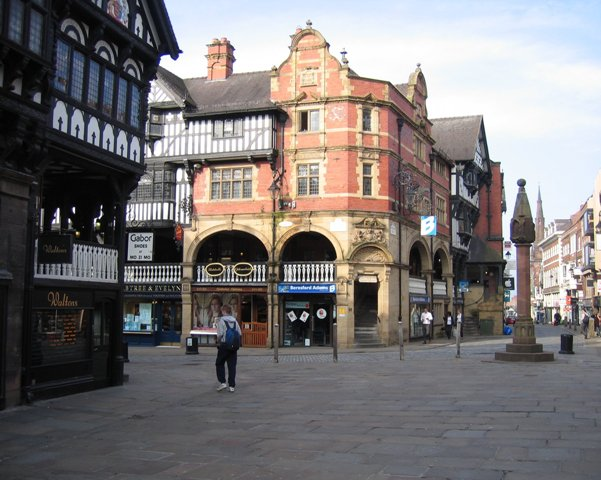
Chester Cross showing two of Lockwood's buildings: part of 1 Bridge Street on the left, and 2–8 Bridge Street in the centre

Thomas Meakin Lockwood (1830 – 15 July 1900) was an English architect whose main works are in and around Chester, Cheshire. He was born in London, and brought up in East Anglia. From 1851 he was articled to Philip Causton Lockwood, the Borough Surveyor of Brighton. He then worked in offices including that of George Woodhouse, and of T. M. Penson in Chester. In 1862 he established an independent practice in Chester. His works are mainly in Cheshire, Shropshire, and North Wales. His designs, influenced by John Douglas and Norman Shaw, are frequently either timber-framed, or in brick and stone incorporating Tudor, Elizabethan and Renaissance features. In Cheshire and North Wales, his most important patron was the First Duke of Westminster. Lockwood's most prominent buildings, which stand at Chester Cross, were commissioned by the Duke. They stand on opposite corners at the north end of Bridge Street, and are in contrasting styles. Number 1 Bridge Street, built in 1888, is timber-framed in Black-and-white Revival style. Number 2–8 Bridge Street, built in 1894, is in stone and diapered brick, and incorporates Tudor, Jacobean and Baroque features. Lockwood also designed the Grosvenor Museum, also in Chester, built in 1885–86. It is constructed in red brick, and is in Renaissance style with Dutch gables.

In 1892 Lockwood's sons, William Thomas and Philip H. Lockwood, joined him in partnership; the practice was known as T. M. Lockwood and Sons, and was continued by his sons after his death. The firm continued into the 20th century as Lockwood Abercrombie and Saxon, with Philip being joined in partnership by internationally renowned architect and planner Sir Patrick Abercrombie. Lockwood's firm still continues to operate in Chester as Lovelock Mitchell, now one of the world's oldest architecture firms.

According to the architectural historian Edward Hubbard, Lockwood is the only 19th-century Chester architect other than John Douglas to have acquired a national reputation. A memorial window to his memory is in the north aisle of St John the Baptist's Church, Chester.

== See also ==
- List of works by Thomas Lockwood
