= Chester High Cross =

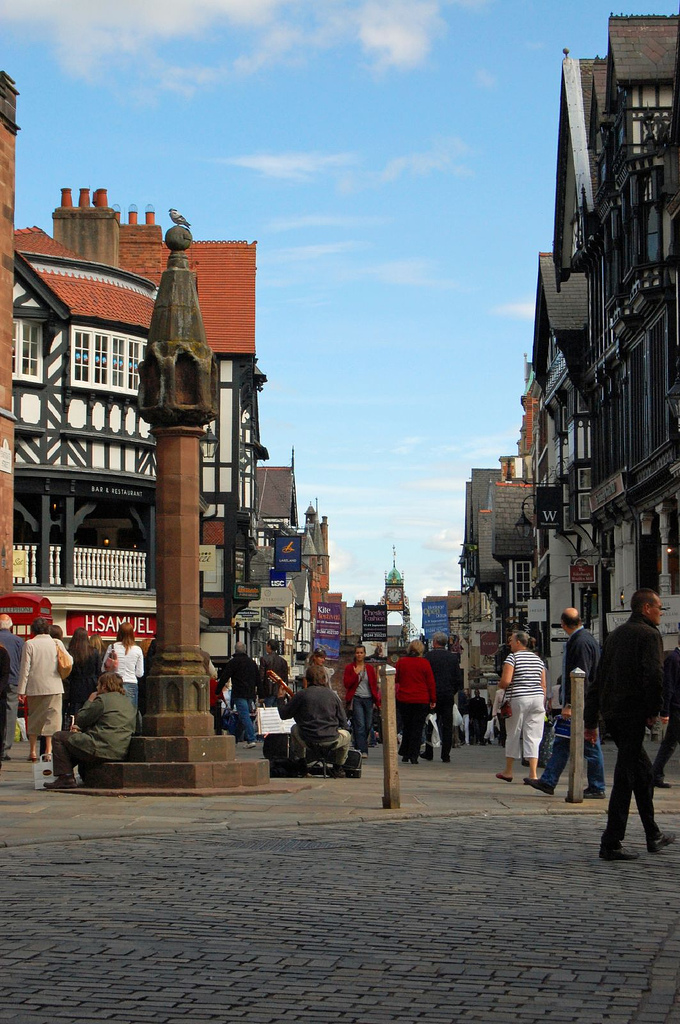
- Chester High Cross standing at the junction of streets known as Chester Cross

- Location in Cheshire
- 53.190290°N 2.891635°W
- Location: Chester Cross, Chester, Cheshire, England
- OS grid reference: SJ 405 662

Listed Building – Grade II
- Official name: Chester High Cross
- Designated: 28 July 1955
- Reference no.: 1376246

Chester High Cross is in Chester, Cheshire, England. It stands in front of St Peter's Church at the junction of Watergate Street, Eastgate Street and Bridge Street, a site known as Chester Cross. The cross is recorded in the National Heritage List for England as a designated Grade II listed building.

== History ==
The original cross dated from the 14th century. This cross was replaced by a new one in 1476. It consisted of an octagonal pillar surmounted by a carved head and a crucifix on its top. The cross was gilded in 1603. It was damaged and broken up by the Parliamentarians during the Civil War in 1646. The base and shaft were saved and kept in the grounds of Sir John Cotgreave at Netherleigh. The head and other possible fragments were rediscovered in the 19th century. They were used in a restoration of the cross which was erected near the Newgate in 1949. In 1975 the cross was moved to its present site, near to its original position.

== Structure ==
The cross is constructed in red sandstone. It consists of a crown surmounted by a finial with a ball on its top. It stands on a shaft on a plinth below which are three steps. The head is hexagonal, while the shaft, steps and plinth are octagonal. The head, and possibly the moulded base of the shaft, date from the 14th century; the rest of the structure is modern. The head is badly weathered; niches which formerly contained statues are on each side, but two of these have been weathered away.

== Today ==
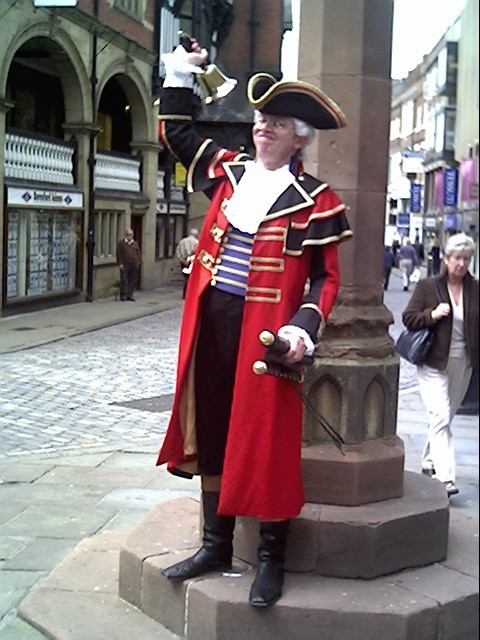
Chester town crier on the cross.

Chester High Cross stands at the centre of the city of Chester and is a popular meeting point. During the summer months Chester's town crier makes a midday proclamation from its steps.

== See also ==
- Grade II listed buildings in Chester (central)
