= St John the Baptist's Church, Chester =

Coordinates: 53.1890°N 2.8856°W

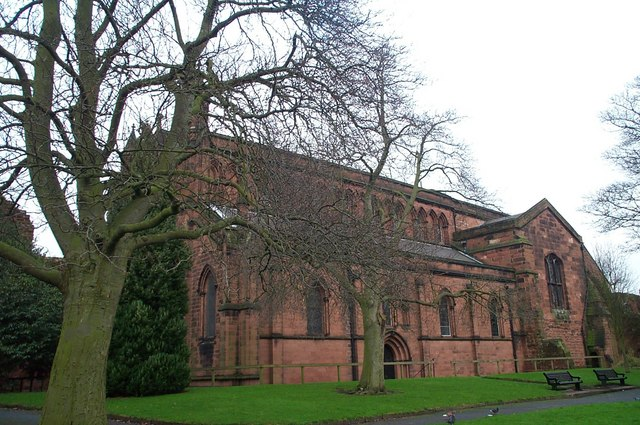
- St John the Baptist's Church, Chester, from the northeast

- Location in Cheshire
- OS grid reference: SJ 40922 66138
- Location: Chester, Cheshire
- Country: England
- Denomination: Church of England
- Previous denomination: Roman Catholic
- Churchmanship: Anglo-Catholic
- Website: https://stjohnschester.uk/

History
- Status: Parish church
- Dedication: John the Baptist

Architecture
- Functional status: Active
- Heritage designation: Grade I
- Designated: 28 July 1955
- Architect(s): R. C. Hussey, John Douglas
- Architectural type: Church
- Style: Norman, Gothic, Gothic Revival
- Completed: 1886

Specifications
- Materials: Sandstone

Administration
- Province: York
- Diocese: Chester
- Archdeaconry: Chester
- Deanery: Chester
- Parish: Chester, St John

Clergy
- Rector: The Revd. Sarah Batchelor

St John the Baptist's Church is a former cathedral in Chester, Cheshire, England during the Early Middle Ages. The church, which was first founded in the late 7th Century by the Anglo-Saxons, is outside the Chester city walls on a cliff above the north bank of the River Dee. It is now considered to be the best example of 11th–12th century church architecture in Cheshire, and was once the seat of the Bishop of Lichfield from 1075 to 1095.

The church remained Chester's cathedral until 1082 when the see was transferred to Coventry. With the English Reformation in the 16th century, a separate Diocese of Chester was created in 1541; the former Chester Abbey became Chester Cathedral and St John the Baptist lost its ecclesiastic importance. The east wing was partially demolished and its status was reduced to a parish church. Although repairs were carried out during the reign of Elizabeth I, the church was garrisoned in the English Civil War by the Roundheads during the siege of Chester in 1645. In the middle to late 19th century, restorations created the present-day church within remains of the larger medieval building. The site is designated Grade I listed building and is recorded in the National Heritage List for England.

St John the Baptist remains an active Church of England parish church in the diocese of Chester, the archdeaconry of Chester and the deanery of Chester. Historian Alec Clifton-Taylor includes it in his list of 'best' English parish churches.

== History ==
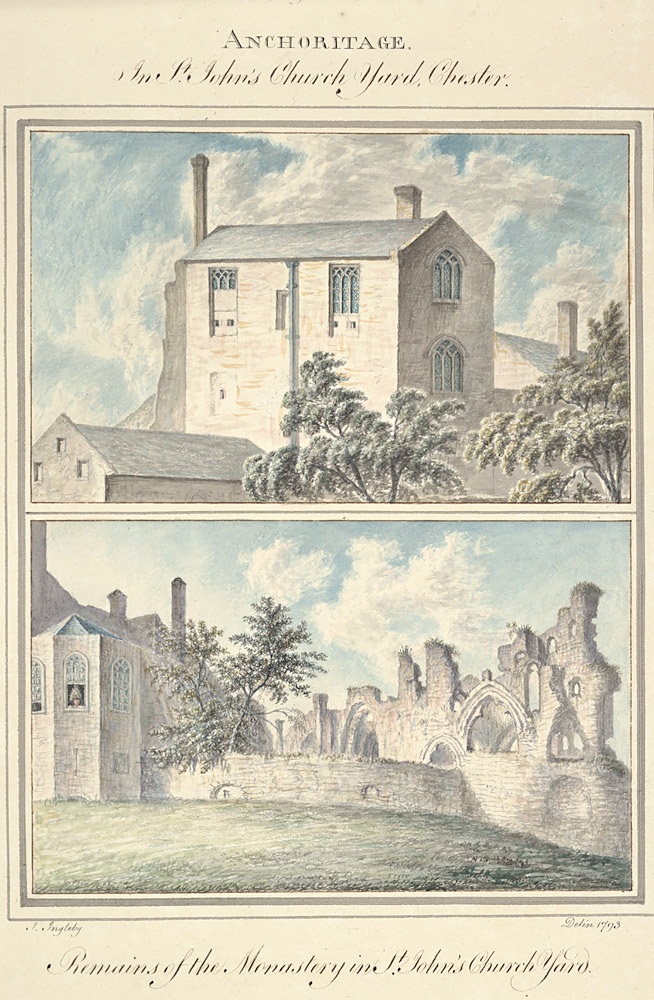
St John's churchyard and remains of the monastery, 1793

The church was reputedly founded by King Aethelred in AD 689. In 973, the Anglo-Saxon Chronicle records that, after his coronation at Bath, King Edgar of England, came to Chester where he held his court in a palace in a place now known as Edgar's field near the old Dee bridge in Handbridge. Taking the helm of a barge, he was rowed the short distance up the River Dee from Edgar's field to St John the Baptist's Church by six (the monk Henry Bradshaw records he was rowed by eight kings) tributary kings where a royal council was held.

During the 11th century, Earl Leofric was a "great benefactor" of the church. In 1075 Peter, Bishop of Lichfield moved the seat of his see to Chester, making St John's his cathedral. Peter's successor moved his seat to Coventry in 1095, and St John's became a co-cathedral. The building of the church continued on a large scale until the end of the 13th century and continued as a collegiate church of secular canons. Owain Glyndŵr and others made their depositions at the Court of Chivalry inquiry into the Scrope v Grosvenor controversy held here on 3 September 1386. In 1468 the central tower collapsed.

After the dissolution of the monasteries, much of the east end of the church was demolished and some of it remains as ruins to the east of the present church. Since the Dissolution, it has been a parish church. Parish registers began in 1559, and in 1581 the parishioners obtained a grant of fabric from Elizabeth I to restore the nave as a parish church. In 1572 the northwest tower partially collapsed and in 1574 there was a greater collapse of this tower which destroyed the western bays of the nave. This was rebuilt on a "magnificent scale". In 1645, during the siege of Chester when the Royalists held the city for Charles I, the Parliamentary forces besieging the city used the church as a garrison and gun platform from which they bombarded the city and its walls.

Between 1859–66 and 1886–87, a Victorian restoration of the church was undertaken by R. C. Hussey. While the northwest tower was being repaired in 1881 it collapsed again, this time destroying the north porch. The porch was rebuilt in 1881–82 by John Douglas who also built the northeast belfry tower in 1886. In 1925 the chapel at the south east corner, then the Warburton chapel, was extended to form a Lady Chapel.

== Architecture ==
=== Exterior ===
The church is built in sandstone. At the west end is the ruined first stage of the northwest tower. The plan of the body of the church consists of a four-bay nave with a clerestory, north and south aisles and a north porch, a crossing with north and south transepts each of one bay, a five-bay chancel with aisles, and chapels at the north and south. The north chapel lies beneath the 1886 belfry tower and is now used as a vestry; the south chapel is the Lady Chapel. To the south of the Lady Chapel is a room known as the Chapter House.

=== Interior ===
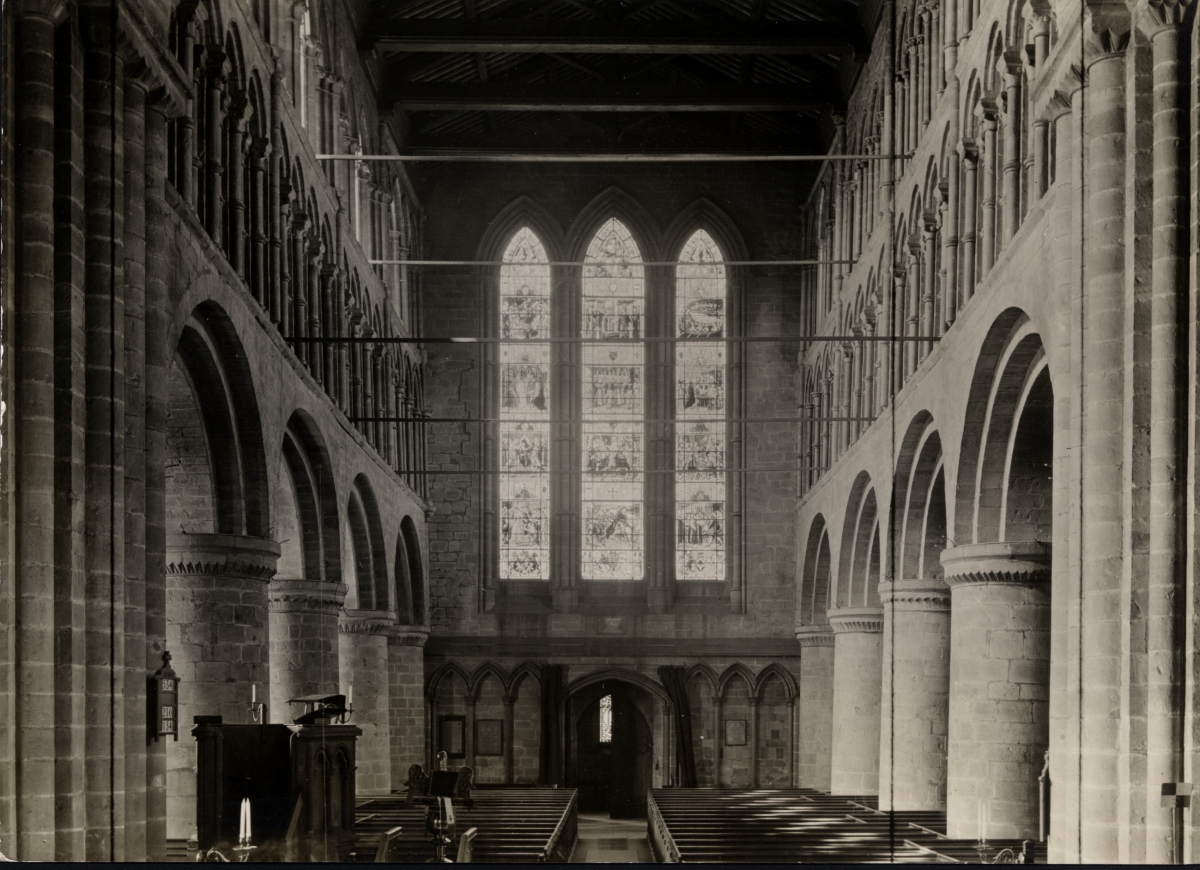
St John's, Chester (1914)

While the external fabric of the church is largely Early English in style due to the Victorian restorations, much of the interior consists of Norman material. This is present in the nave, the crossing, the first bay of the chancel, the arch to the Lady Chapel and in the remains of the choir chapels. Richards considers that it is the best masonry of the Norman period in Cheshire. Inside the church are many early effigies which are all damaged, some dating as far back as the late 13th or early 14th century. Monuments to the Warburton family are in the Lady Chapel. In the church are two fonts, one dating from the 15th century, the other from the Commonwealth period. Two brass chandeliers are dated 1722. The pulpit is from the 19th century. The reredos, dated 1876, is by John Douglas and was made by Morris & Co.; it includes a painting of the Last Supper. The organ had been built as a temporary organ for the coronation of Queen Victoria in 1838 by William Hill and Company of London. It was then rebuilt for St John's, transported to Chester by barge and installed at the west end of the church. It was opened on 28 October 1838 with the opening recital given by Henry Gauntlett as he could actually play the pedals. In the 1859–66 restoration it was moved to the south transept and in 1895–96 it was moved to the north transept, when the organ was put in its current case. In the 1960s it was converted to electro-pneumatic action by Charles Whiteley and Company. In 2002 it was restored by Rod Billingsley following vandalism. The organ case dated 1895 is by Thomas M. Lockwood. A memorial to Lockwood is in the north aisle. The stained glass in the east window dated 1863 was designed by T. M. Penson and made by Clayton and Bell. The west window was designed by Edward Frampton and is dated 1887–1890. In the north aisle is a barely visible wall painting of St John the Baptist. The church contains nine memorial boards by members of the Randle Holme family. Also inside the church are fragments of late Anglo-Saxon stone crosses that are thought to have been originally in the churchyard. The parish registers begin in 1559.

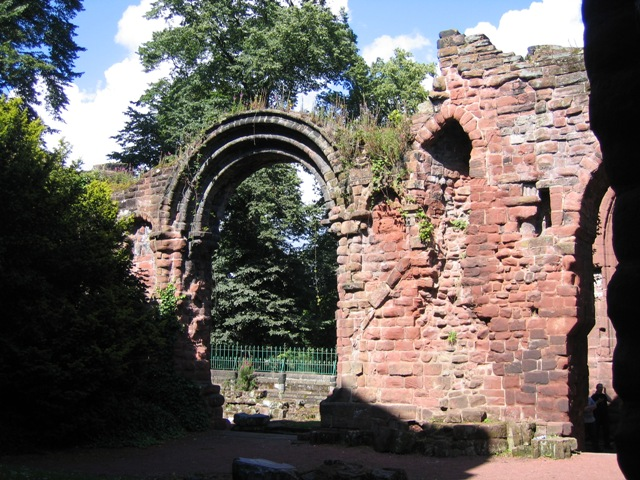
Ruins of St John's

== Gallery ==
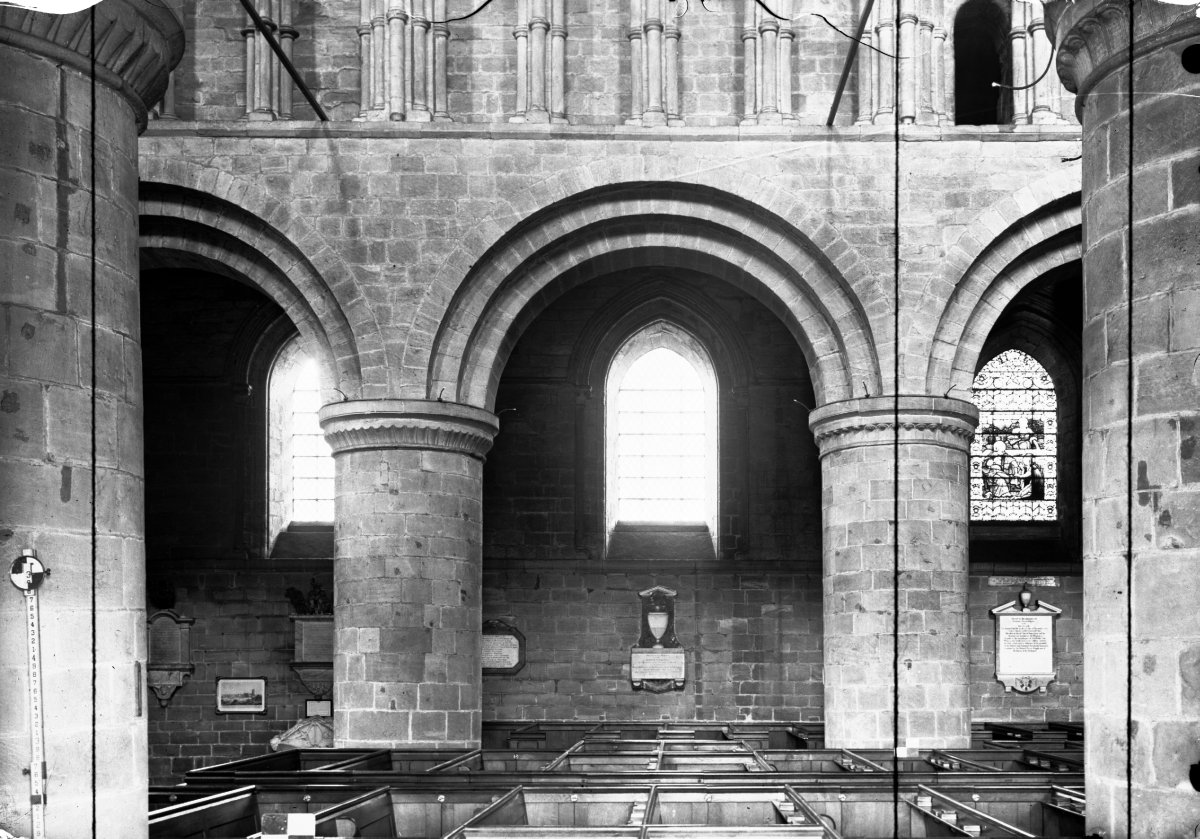

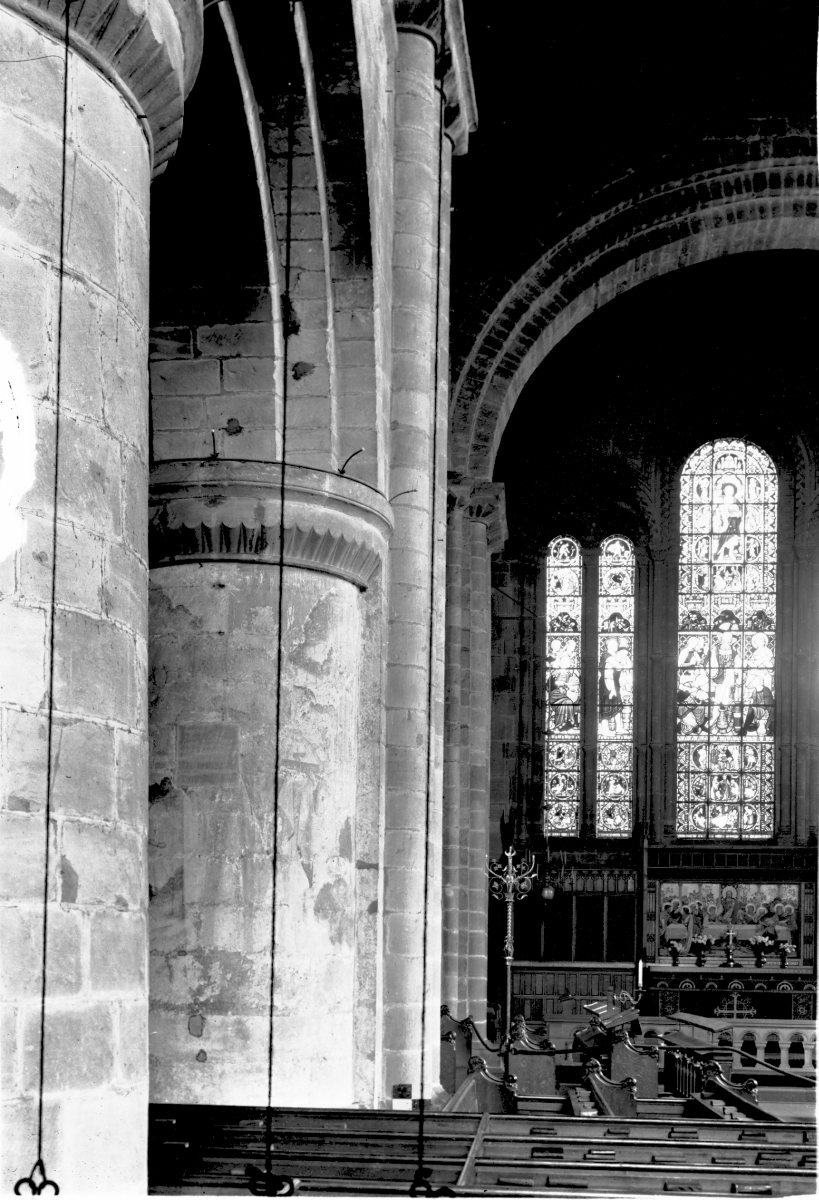

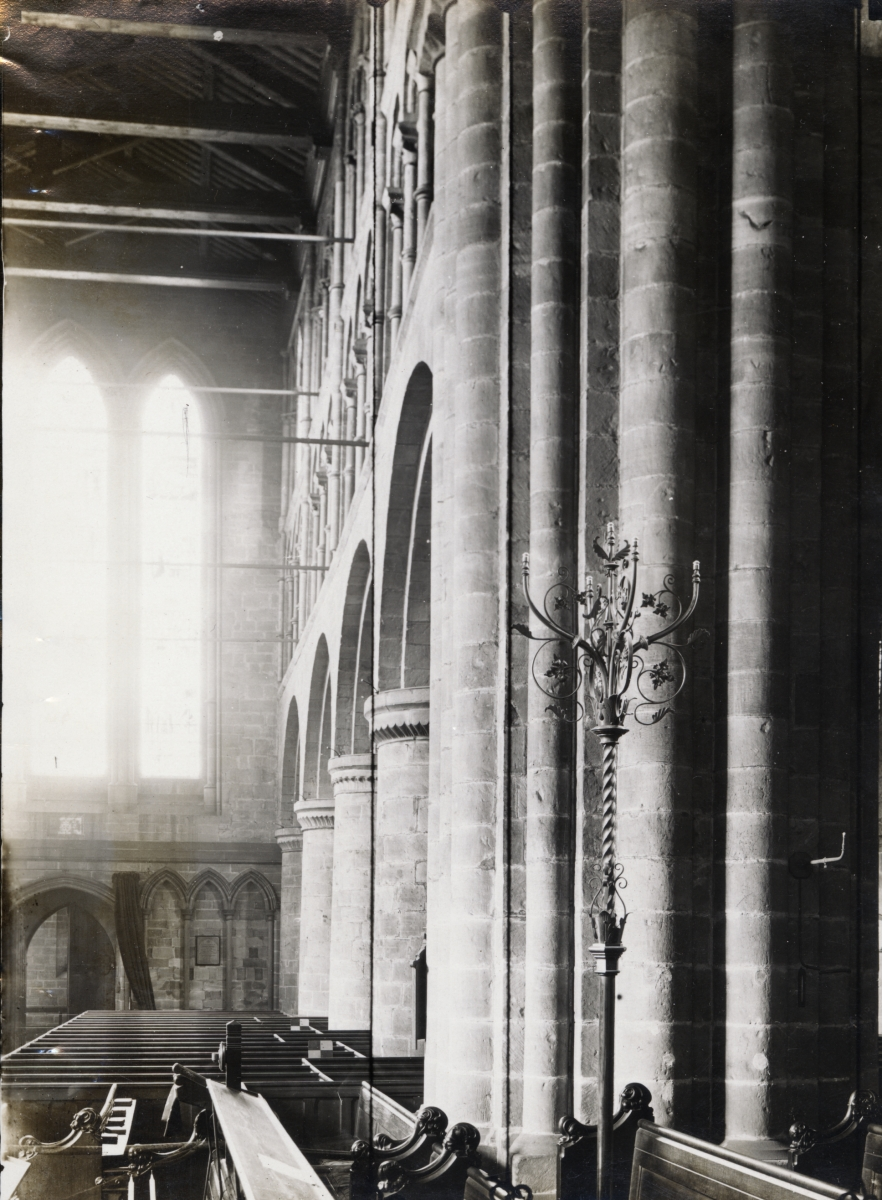

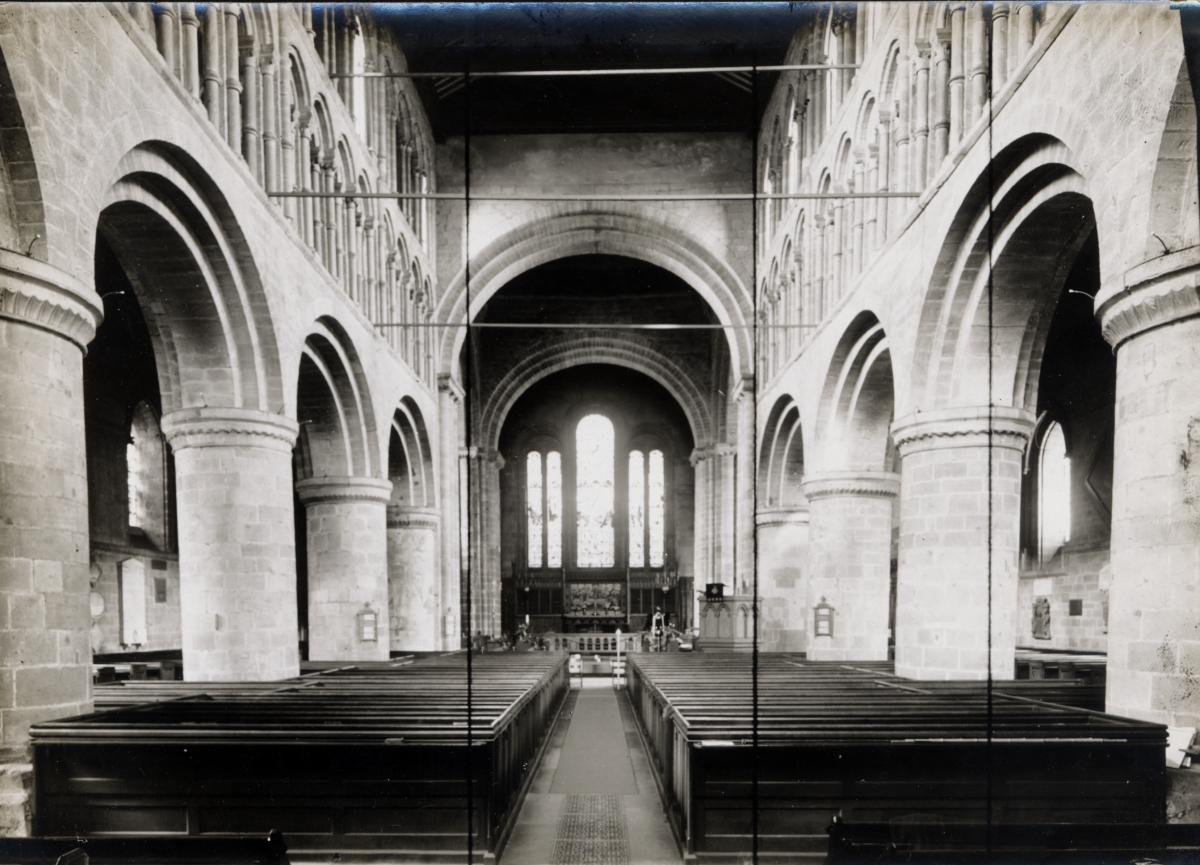

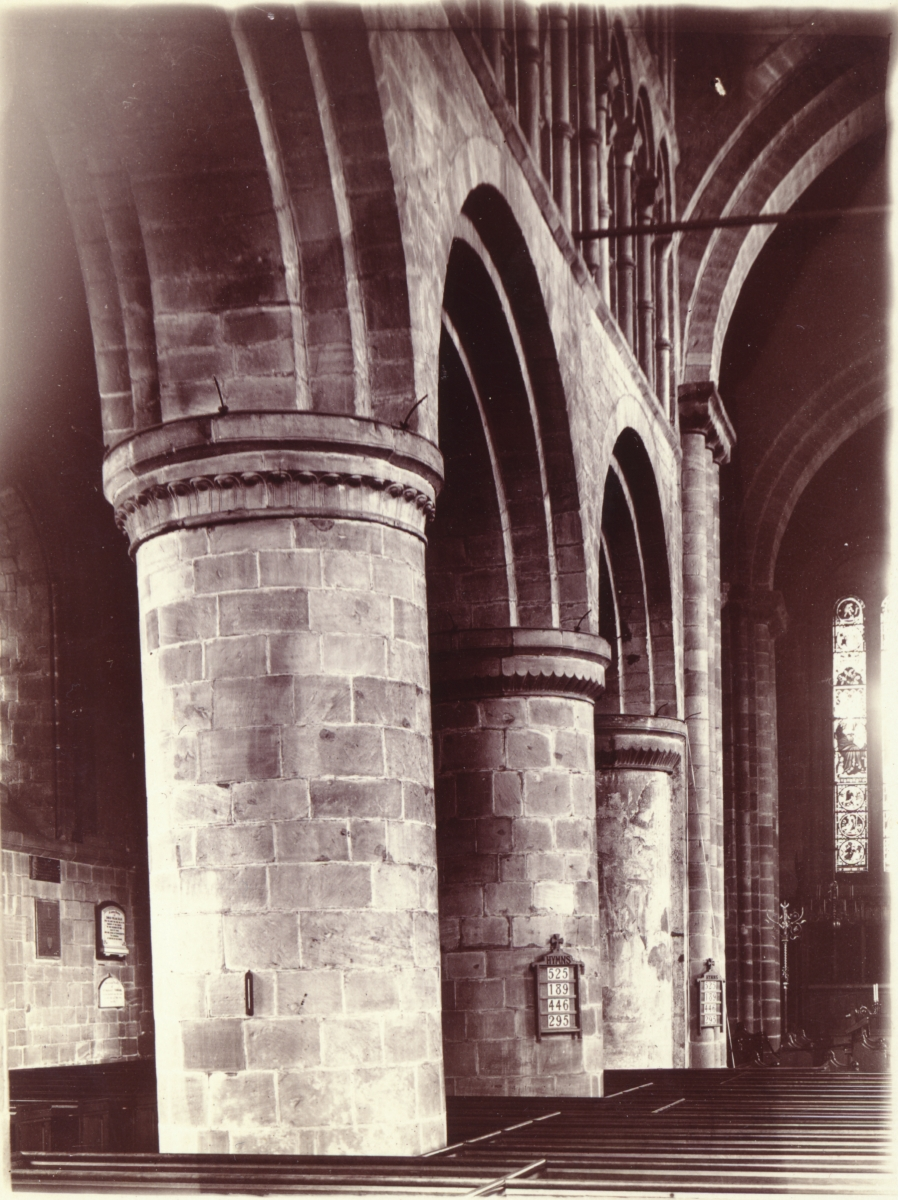

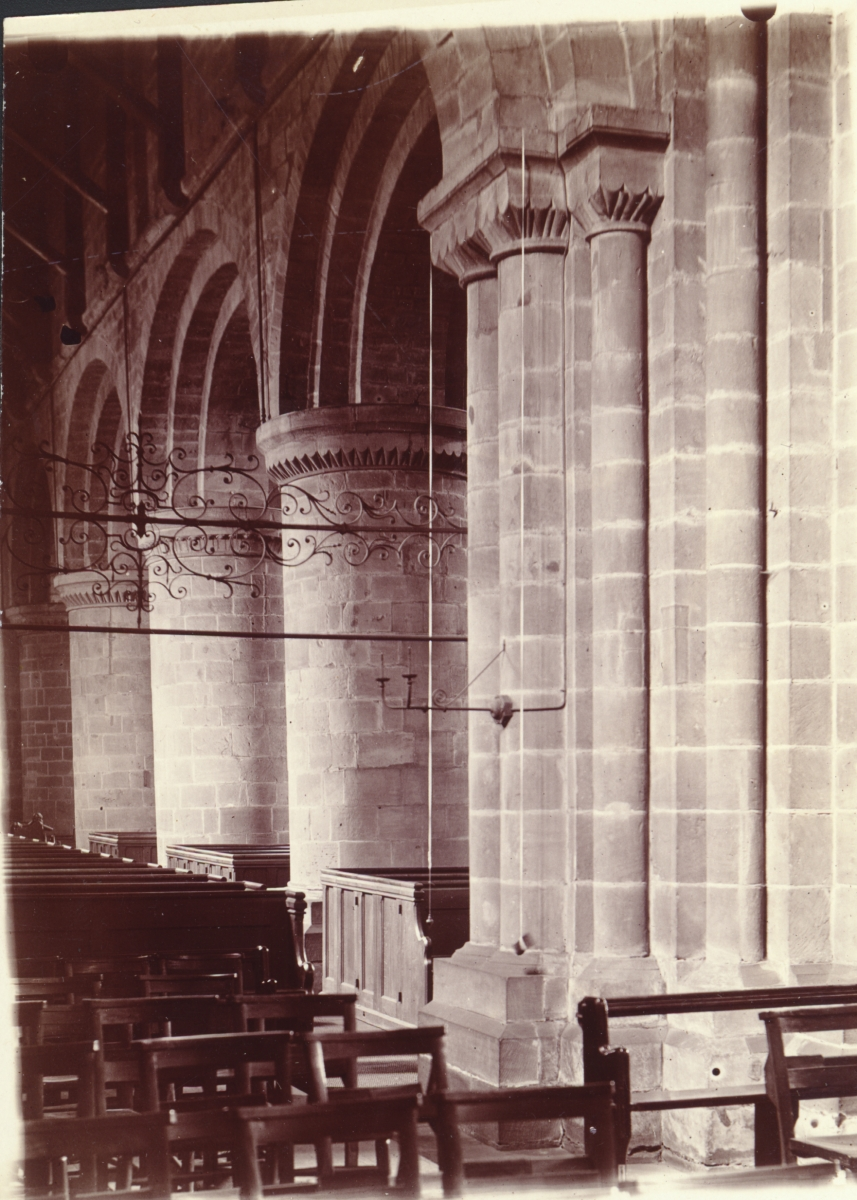

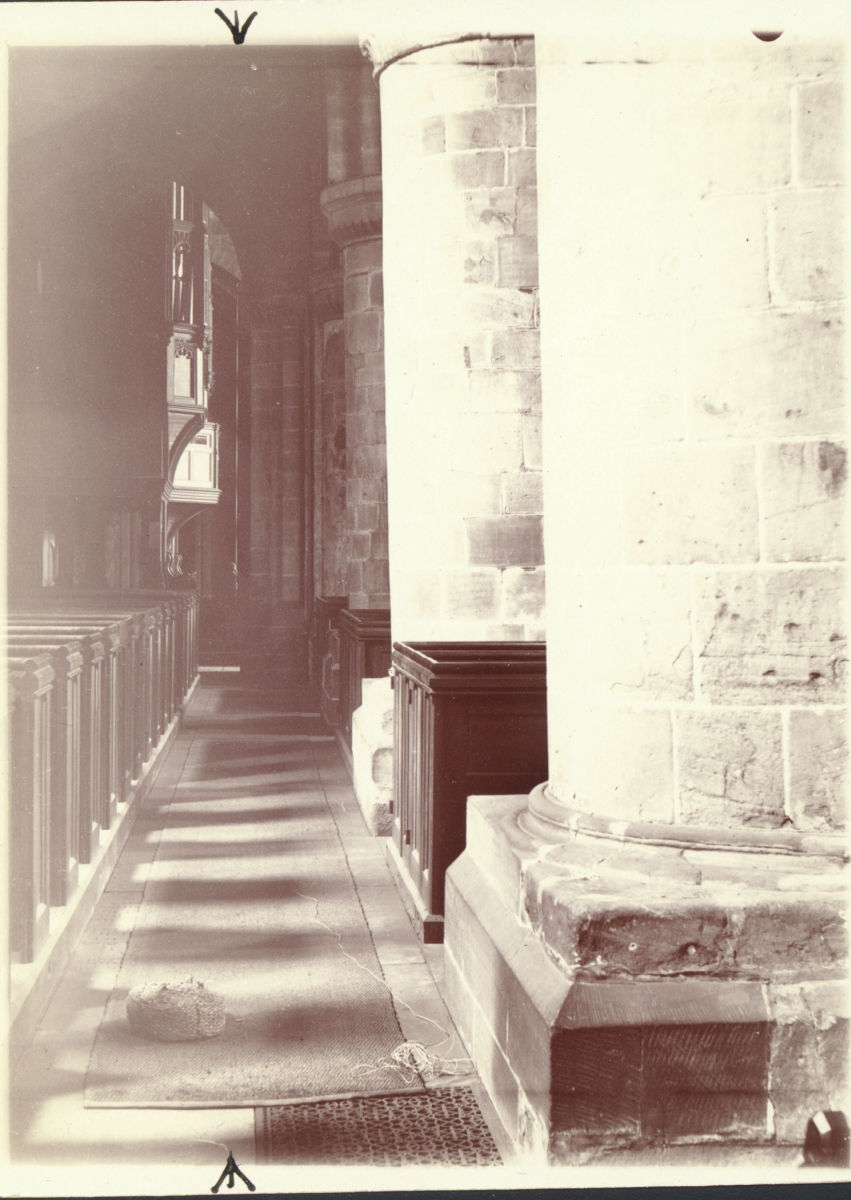

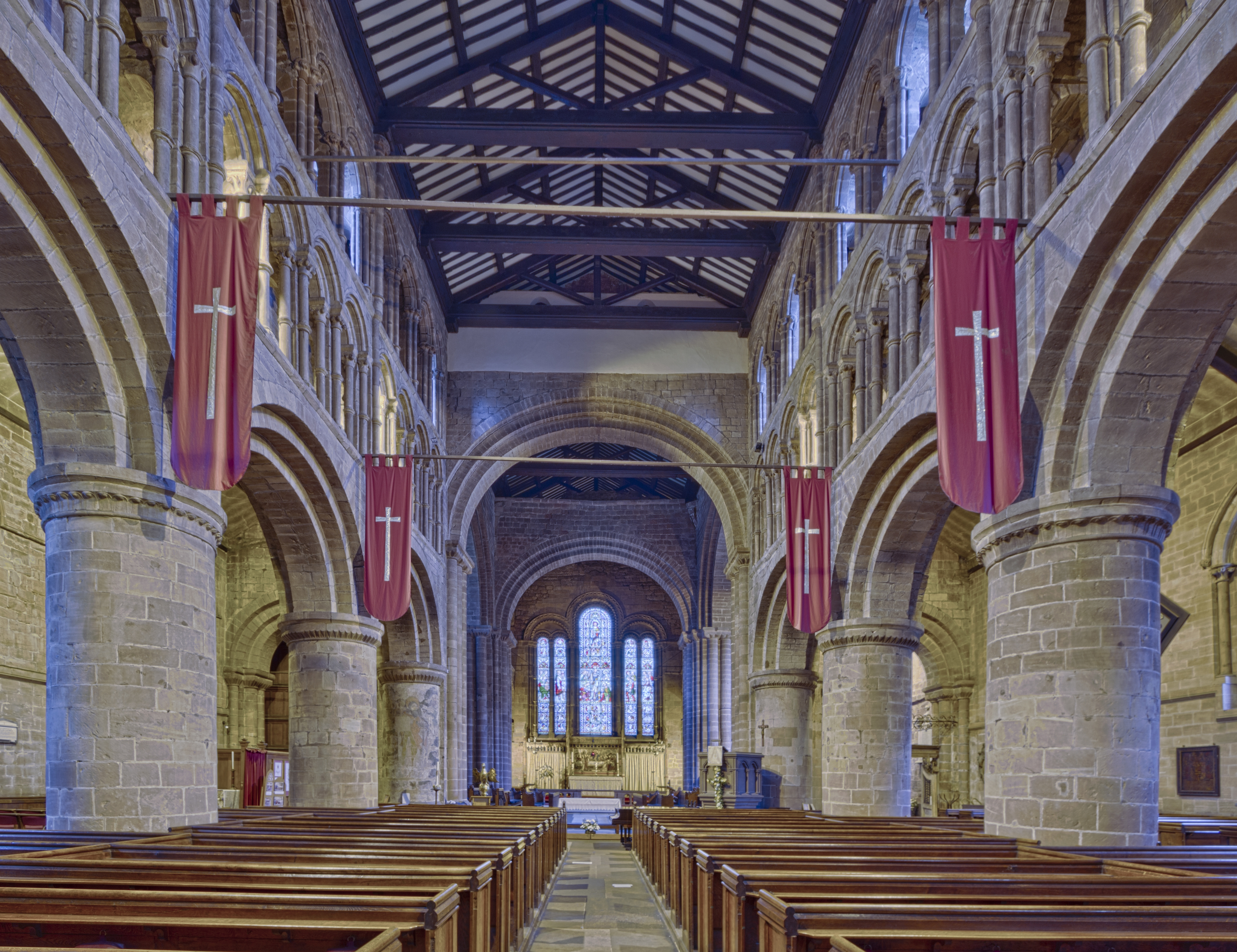
Nave looking east

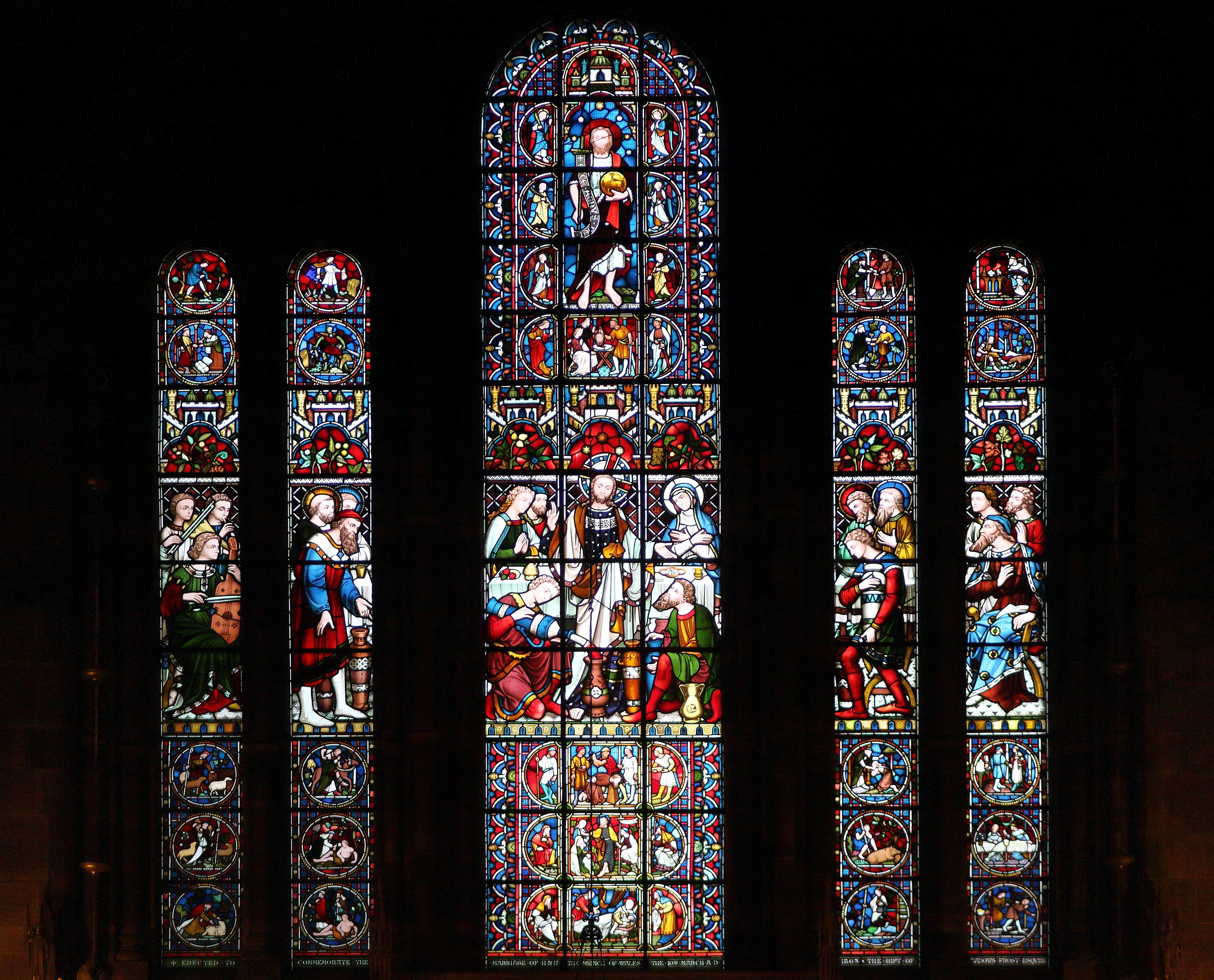
The east window, depicting the wedding feast at Cana

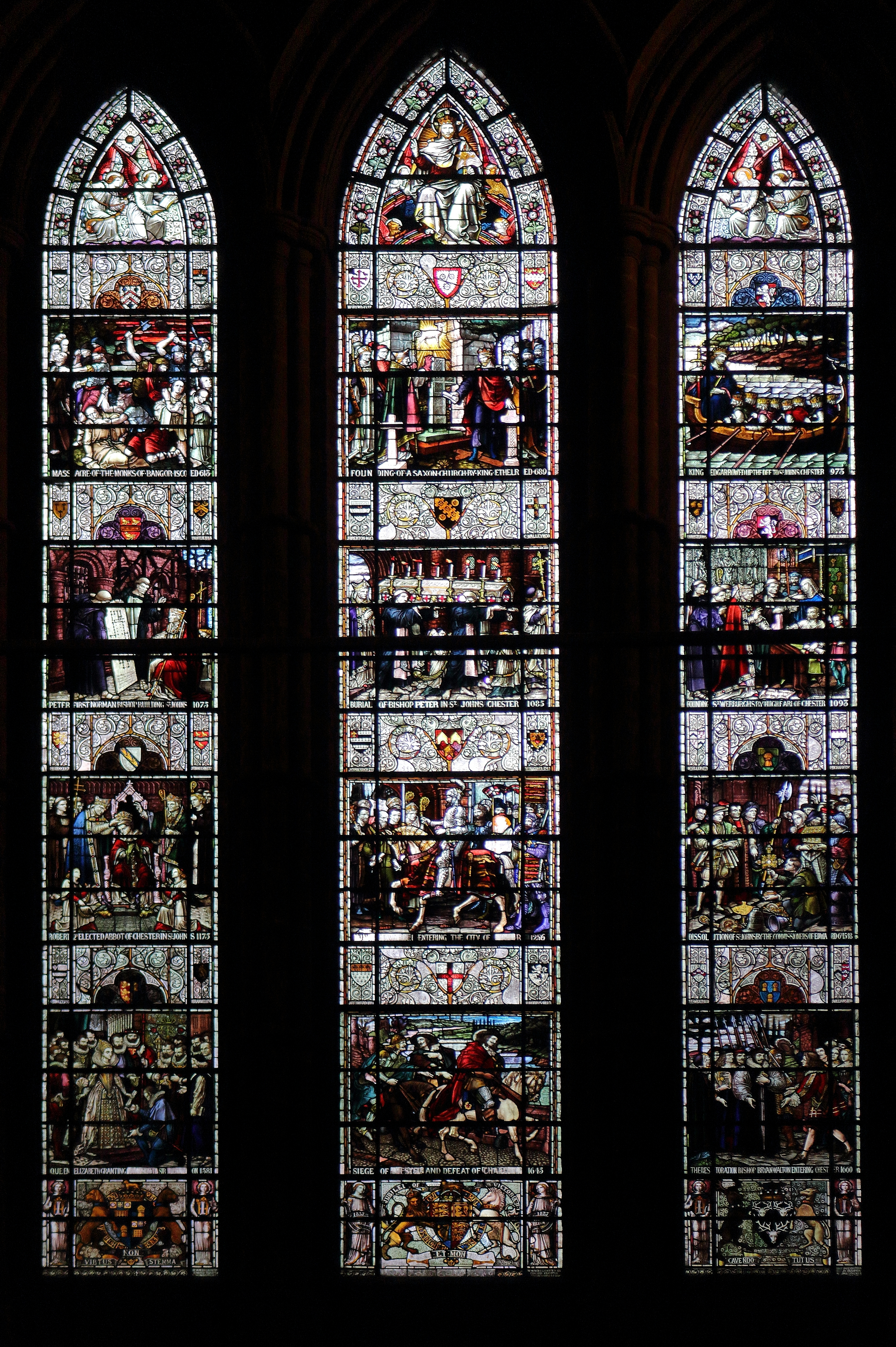
The west window, depicting the history of Chester

== External features ==
Outside the church to the east are ruined remains including parts of former chapels, which are recognised as a scheduled monument.

The exterior of the church contains a few tombstones that remain in their original positions. The vast majority of the gravestones have now been repositioned and laid to the ground forming the footpaths immediately in front of the church. In 2009 a research project recorded the inscriptions on the remaining tombs and gravestones.

The nearby Anchorite's Cell, Chester was originally associated with the church.

== See also ==
- Norman architecture in Cheshire
- Grade I listed churches in Cheshire
- Grade I listed buildings in Cheshire West and Chester
- Scheduled Monuments in Cheshire (1066–1539)
- List of church restorations, amendments and furniture by John Douglas
