= Grosvenor Museum =

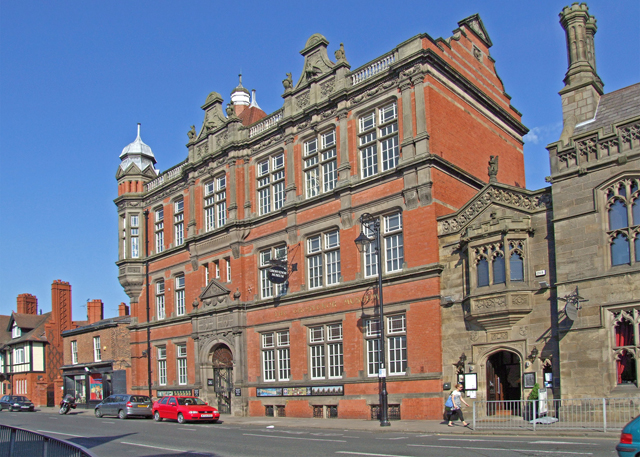
- Grosvenor Museum

- Location in Cheshire
- 53.1873°N 2.8924°W
- Location: Grosvenor Street, Chester, Cheshire, UK
- OS grid reference: SJ 404 659

History
- Built: 1886
- Built for: Chester Society for Natural Science, Literature and Art

Site notes
- Architect: Thomas Lockwood
- Architectural style: Free Renaissance

Listed Building – Grade II
- Designated: 6 August 1998
- Reference no.: 1376261

Grosvenor Museum is a museum in Chester, Cheshire, in the United Kingdom. It is recorded in the National Heritage List for England as a designated Grade II listed building. Its full title is The Grosvenor Museum of Natural History and Archaeology, with Schools of Science and Art, for Chester, Cheshire and North Wales. It takes its name from the family name of the Dukes of Westminster, who are major landowners in Cheshire. The museum opened in 1886, it was extended in 1894, and major refurbishments took place between 1989 and 1999. Its contents include archaeological items from the Roman period, paintings, musical instruments, and a room arranged as a Victorian parlour.

== Early history ==
Grosvenor Museum was founded in 1885, largely due to the inspiration and work of the Chester Society for Natural Science, Literature and Art. This society had been founded in 1871 by Charles Kingsley, who was at that time a canon of Chester Cathedral. In 1873 it joined forces with the Chester Archaeological Society and the Schools of Science and Art to raise money to build the museum. A sum of £11,000 (£1.03 million in 2025) was raised, which included a donation of £4,000 (£380,000 in 2025) from the First Duke of Westminster. The Duke also gave a plot of land in Grosvenor Street. Thomas Lockwood was appointed as architect. The foundation stone was laid on 3 February 1885 by the Duke, and the museum was officially opened by him on 9 August 1886. A major extension was built in 1894. The first curator was Robert Newstead, who served in this position from 1886 to 1913 and again from 1922 to 1947. Newstead later became Professor Emeritus of Entomology at Liverpool University and was made a freeman of Chester. In 1915 the City of Chester took over the administration of the museum, and in 1938 the authority took full control of the collections and displays.

== Architecture ==
The museum is in Ruabon red brick with sandstone dressings, and it has a red tile roof in free Renaissance style. Above the door are spandrels with carvings representing Science and Art. The Dutch gables are carved with peacocks flanked by the supporters of the Grosvenor arms. In the entrance hall are four columns made from Shap granite, and a mosaic which features the city arms, which was made by the firm of Ludwig Oppenheimer.

== More recent history ==
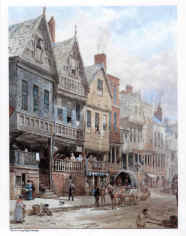
Bishop Lloyd's Palace by Louise Rayner

In 1947 Graham Webster took over as curator and devised the Newstead Gallery, named after his predecessor, which opened in 1953. Webster saved 20 Castle Street from demolition and created in it the first period room, the Victorian Parlour, which opened in 1955. Numismatist Elizabeth Pirie began her career there in 1955. A new art gallery was created in 1989. In 1990 a major reconstruction took place, refurbishing all the public galleries. The museum was re-opened in 1992 by the Prince of Wales. In 1993 the Webster Roman Stones Gallery won the North West Museum of the Year award, and in 1999 the museum was awarded £300,000 from the Heritage Lottery Fund to make improvements on accessibility and to create a new shop. This was re-opened in 2000, giving full ground-floor access to all visitors.

== Present day ==
The museum has over 100,000 visitors each year. The Education Service is housed on the top floor of the museum and gives opportunities for children to learn about the history of the city. The museum contains a collection of Roman tombstones. It also owns 23 paintings by Louise Rayner, which is the largest number in any public collection. The museum also holds six recorders made by Peter Bressan; four of these form the only complete set of Bressan recorders in the country. A programme of temporary exhibitions is arranged by the museum. The museum is open on most days of the year, and admission is free.

== See also ==
- Grade II listed buildings in Chester (central)
- List of museums in Cheshire
