= St Peter's Church, Chester =

Coordinates: 53.1904°N 2.8918°W

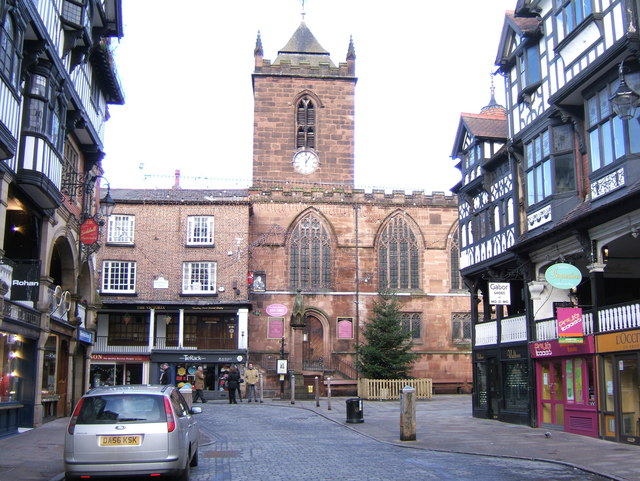
- Chester Cross showing St Peter's Church

- Location in Cheshire
- OS grid reference: SJ 404,663
- Location: Chester, Cheshire
- Country: England
- Denomination: Church of England
- Churchmanship: Evangelical
- Website: Parish of Chester St Peter

History
- Status: Parish church
- Dedication: Saint Peter

Architecture
- Functional status: Active
- Heritage designation: Grade I
- Designated: 28 August 1955
- Architect: John Douglas (restoration)
- Architectural type: Church
- Style: Gothic
- Completed: 1886

Specifications
- Materials: Red sandstone Slate spire

Administration
- Province: York
- Diocese: Chester
- Archdeaconry: Chester
- Deanery: Chester
- Parish: Chester, St Peter

Clergy
- Priest: Rev Jonathan Phillips

St Peter's Church is in Eastgate Street in the centre of the city of Chester, Cheshire, England, immediately to the north of Chester Cross. It is recorded in the National Heritage List for England as a designated Grade I listed building. It is an active Church of England parish church in the diocese of Chester, the archdeaconry of Chester and the deanery of Chester. The ancient walls mark the boundaries of the parish.

== History ==
The church stands on the site of part of the Roman Praetorium, and some of its fabric dates from that time. A church is said to have been built on this site by Ethelfleda in 907. The present church dates from the 14th, 15th and 16th centuries, with modifications in the following three centuries. Formerly, the tower had a spire, which was removed and rebuilt in the 16th century, taken down in the 17th century, then rebuilt and finally removed "having been much injured by lightning" in around 1780. In 1849–50, the church was repaired by James Harrison, and in 1886 it was restored by John Douglas, which included the addition of a pyramidal spire.

== Architecture ==
=== Exterior ===
The church is built of red sandstone and is approximately square in plan. Its floor is at the level of the adjacent Watergate Row and the church is entered by a flight of seven stone steps on the south face. At the west end there is an embraced tower that rises one stage above the roof, with a clock and a bell opening of two lights. The top is crenellated, with crocketed pinnacles and a pyramidal slate spire.

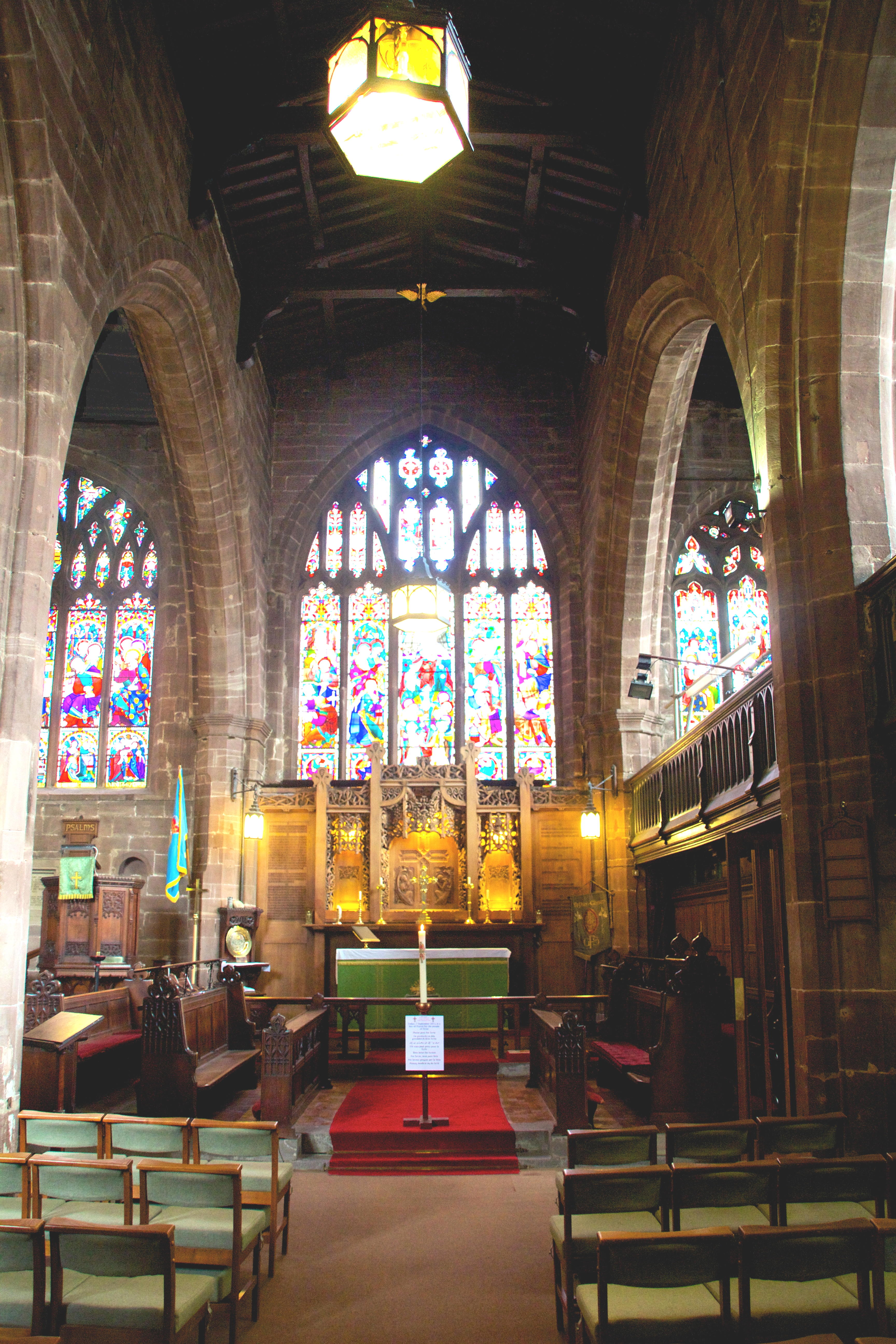
Interior of the church

=== Interior ===
Inside the church is a continuous nave and chancel with four aisles. The west end is attached to and extends behind the backs of the adjacent buildings. Over the outer aisles and at the west end are galleries. The baptistry lies below the tower. On the northeast pier is a niche that formerly contained a statue of the Virgin and Child, and surrounding it is the best-preserved medieval wall painting in Cheshire. On the south wall under the gallery are three corbels with medieval carvings of an angel, a woman and an old man. The marble font is dated 1662. In the south aisle attached to a pier is a 15th-century brass thought to depict a lawyer, and elsewhere in the church are memorials from the 17th century and two memorial boards by the Randle Holme family. The stained glass in the east window dates from 1863 and is by Heaton, Butler and Bayne. Glass in a window on the southeast of the church is by Clayton and Bell, and there is a west window by Trena Cox. The organ has two manuals and was built by Whiteley. There is a ring of six bells. Five of these which are dated 1709 are by Rudhall of Gloucester and the other, dated 1921, is by John Taylor and Company. The parish registers date from 1559 and the churchwardens' accounts from 1626, although the volume dating from 1686 to 1803 has been lost.

== See also ==
- Grade I listed churches in Cheshire
- Grade I listed buildings in Cheshire West and Chester
- List of church restorations, amendments and furniture by John Douglas
- List of works by Thomas Harrison
