= Chester Cross (junction) =

Junction of streets in Cheshire, England

Coordinates: 53.1903°N 2.8916°W

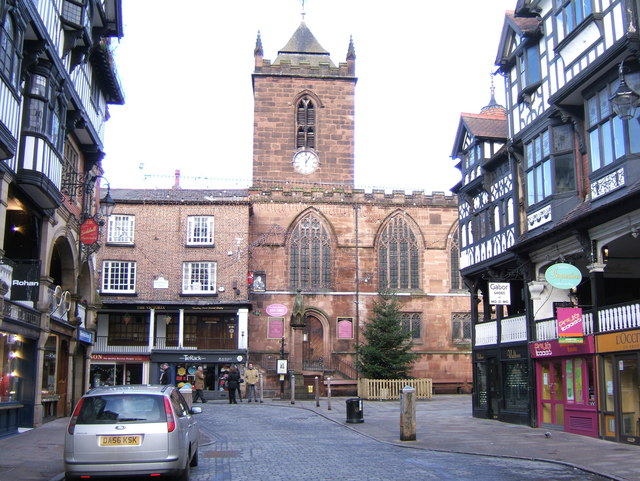
Chester Cross from the south, showing St Peter's Church

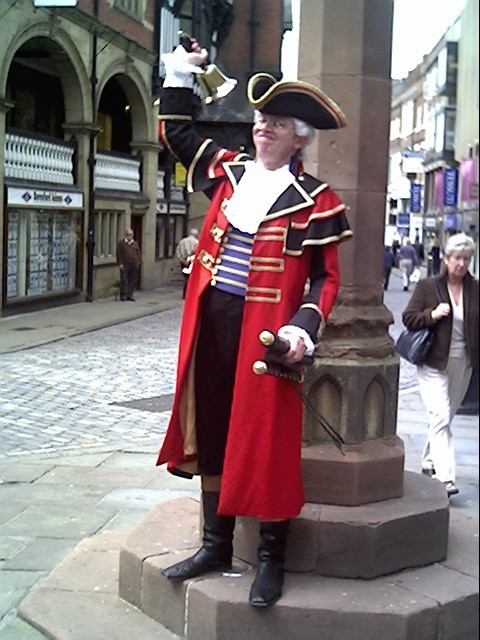
The town crier on Chester High Cross

Chester Cross is a junction of streets at the centre of the city of Chester, Cheshire, England (grid reference SJ405662).

The streets meeting at the junction are Watergate Street, Eastgate Street, Bridge Street and Northgate Street. The junction consists of a staggered crossroads, with Watergate Street in continuity with Eastgate Street, and Bridge Street joining the junction to the west of Northgate Street. Watergate Street, Eastgate Street, Bridge Street were the main roads in Chester when it was a Roman fortress. To the north of the point where Bridge Street met the other streets was the Roman principia (headquarters building). It is thought that Northgate Street was driven through the ruins of the Roman buildings in the 10th century.

The centrepiece of Chester Cross is the Grade II listed building Chester High Cross, a medieval cross which was damaged in the Civil War, then removed elsewhere, and reinstated in its original position in 1975. Immediately to the north of Chester Cross is St Peter's Church, a Grade I listed building. At the southeast corner of the junction is 1 Bridge Street, a Grade II* listed building. Today Chester Cross is a popular meeting point. During the summer months Chester's town crier makes a midday proclamation from the steps of the High Cross.
