= List of works by Thomas Mainwaring Penson =

Thomas Mainwaring Penson (1818–64) was an English surveyor and architect. He was born in Oswestry, Shropshire, the son of Thomas Penson, also a surveyor and architect, and was educated at Oswestry School. He and his brother, Richard Kyrke Penson, then trained in their father's practice. He designed buildings in the area of the practice, including stations for the Shrewsbury and Chester Railway. He was appointed as county surveyor of Cheshire and moved to Chester, Cheshire. Here he laid out Overleigh Cemetery in 1848–50. This has been designated at Grade II in the National Register of Historic Parks and Gardens. He is credited with pioneering the Black-and-white Revival (vernacular or half-timbered) style in the city during the 1850s. His first building in this style was constructed in Eastgate Street in 1852, but it has since been demolished.

== Key ==
Grade	Criteria
I	Buildings of exceptional interest, sometimes considered to be internationally important
II*	Particularly important buildings of more than special interest
II	Buildings of national importance and special interest

== Works ==
Name	Location	Photograph	Date	Notes	Grade
Holy Trinity Church	Oswestry, Shropshire; 52.8574°N 3.0519°W		1835–37	A new church.	II
Holy Trinity School	Rhyl, Flintshire, Wales		1842	Enlarged in 1855–56, but later demolished.	
St Agatha's Church	Llanymynech, Shropshire; 52.7798°N 3.0875°W		1843–45	A new church replacing a medieval church, in Neo-Norman style. Alterations were made in 1879.	II
Baschurch railway station	Baschurch, Shropshire; 52.7986°N 2.8474°W		1848	Designed for the Shrewsbury and Chester Railway. Now converted into a house.	
Gobowen railway station	Gobowen, Shropshire; 52.8935°N 3.0371°W		1848	Designed for the Shrewsbury and Chester Railway. Restored in the 1980s.	II
Rossett railway station	Rossett, Wrexham, Wales		1848	Designed for the Shrewsbury and Chester Railway. Now demolished.	
Ruabon railway station	Ruabon, Wrexham, Wales; 52.9871°N 3.0433°W		1848	Designed for the Shrewsbury and Chester Railway. Replaced by a new station in 1860.	
Level crossing keeper's cottage	Gobowen, Shropshire; 52.8940°N 3.0375°W		c. 1848	To the north of Gobowen railway station.	II
Gates, gate piers and bridge over drive	Overleigh Cemetery, Chester, Cheshire; 53.1819°N 2.8947°W		1848–50	The original entrance to the cemetery and a bridge.	II
Shrewsbury railway station	Shrewsbury, Shropshire; 52.7117°N 2.7498°W		1849	Extended by Penson in 1885, and later in 1903.	II
Powis Market	Oswestry, Shropshire; 52.8611°N 3.0543°W		1849	Replaced by a modern building in 1963.	
Castle Park House	Frodsham, Cheshire; 53.2926°N 2.7309°W		1850s	A country house for Joseph Stubs, probably designed by Penson.	II
Church Stretton railway station	Church Stretton, Shropshire; 52.5383°N 2.8029°W		1852	The original station, to the north of the road bridge, was closed in 1914. The present station is to the south of the bridge.	
22 Eastgate Street	Chester, Cheshire; 53.1904°N 2.8906°W		1852	A timber-framed building dating from 1610; it was altered in the 18th century, and then refurbished by Penson.	II
Previous Town Hall	Rhyl, Flintshire, Wales		1854–56		
Monument	Overleigh Cemetery, Chester, Cheshire; 53.1819°N 2.8947°W		1857	To the memory of Henry Raikes, Chancellor of the diocese of Chester who died in 1854. Designed by Penson, carved by Thomas Earp.	II
Militia Barracks	Mold, Flintshire, Wales		1857–58	Converted into the County Offices in 1878–88, then demolished in the 1960s.	
Crypt Chambers	Chester, Cheshire; 53.1904°N 2.8903°W		1858	A rebuilding in Gothic style as a department store for Browns of Chester.	I
26 Eastgate Street	Chester, Cheshire; 53.1904°N 2.8905°W		1858–59	A building dating from the 17th century, altered in the early 18th century, and restored by Penson.	II*
School	Northop Road, Flint, Flintshire, Wales		1859	School with four gables and a bellcote; the school house is attached to the left side.	
Queen Hotel	Chester, Cheshire; 53.1961°N 2.8802°W		1860–61	Built in Italianate style opposite Chester railway station, but damaged by fire soon afterwards. It was rebuilt on the same plan in 1862 by Penson with Cornelius Shacklock.	II
National School	Worthenbury, Wrexham, Wales		1862	Now the village hall.	
St John the Baptist's Church	Chester, Cheshire; 53.1890°N 2.8856°W		1863	East window.	I
Grosvenor Hotel	Chester, Cheshire; 53.1907°N 2.8891°W		1863–66	Designed by T. M. Penson for the 2nd Marquess of Westminster. Completed after his death by his brother R. K. Penson and his partner Ritchie.	II
