= Grade II listed buildings in Chester (south) =

The city of Chester in Cheshire, England, contains over 650 structures that are designated as listed buildings by English Heritage and included in the National Heritage List for England. Of these, over 500 are listed at Grade II, the lowest of the three gradings given to listed buildings and applied to "buildings of national importance and special interest". This list contains the Grade II listed buildings in the unparished area of the city to the south of the River Dee. Immediately to the south of the river is the area of Handbridge.

The listed structures in this area have resulted from the growth of the city from the beginning of the 19th century. Many of the listed buildings are houses, and there are also shops, a public house, churches and associated structures, a former boys' club, mileposts, and a telephone kiosk. Overleigh Cemetery was laid out in 1848–50, and contains listed structures, including tombs, monuments, gates, a bridge, and a cenotaph.

Name and location	Photograph	Date	Notes
Netherleigh House; 53.17717°N 2.88622°W	—	c. 1800	A brick country house on a stone plinth with a slate roof that was later extended to the rear. The original part is in two storeys with a five-bay front; the extension is in three storeys. On the front is a portico carried on columns with fluted capitals, and with a Roman Doric entablature. The windows are sashes. The former coach house and yard walls are included in the listing.
Garden walls and gates, Netherleigh House; 53.17740°N 2.88615°W	—	c. 1800	The wall is in sandstone and is 1.8 metres (5.9 ft) high. The gate piers are square with domed tops, and the decorative gates are in wrought iron.
15 and 17 Eaton Road; 53.18162°N 2.88746°W	—	c. 1820	A pair of brick houses with hipped slate roofs. They are in two storeys, and each house has a four-bay front. The doorways have Tudor arches. There are some French windows, and the other windows are a mix of casements and sashes. No. 15 also has a canted bay window.
19 and 21 Eaton Road; 53.18130°N 2.88734°W	—	c. 1820	A pair of brick houses with hipped slate roofs. They are in two storeys, and each house has a four-bay front. Each house has a lattice porch and a five-light French window. The other windows are casements.
Greenbank; 53.17461°N 2.88454°W	—	c. 1820	Built as a country house, it was altered in 1923 by Charles Reilly, and converted into a college in about 1980. The building is stuccoed, is in two storeys, and has a seven-bay front. In the central bay is a projecting portico with square piers, unorthodox capitals, an architrave, a frieze, and a cornice. The right bay consists of a cylindrical bay window. The windows are sashes.
Heronbridge; 53.17084°N 2.88332°W		c. 1830	A pebbledashed country house with hipped slate roofs. It is in two storeys and has a complex plan. Its features include a verandah, bay windows and French windows. Most of the windows are sashes.
Retaining wall 53.18554°N 2.89012°W		c. 1830	The retaining wall is on the bank of the River Dee, and is in sandstone with a parapet of stone slabs.
Bridge over drive, Overleigh Cemetery; 53.18287°N 2.89471°W		c. 1848	The bridge and retaining walls were designed by T. M. Penson. The bridge is in red sandstone and consists of a single semicircular arch with a span of about 3 metres (10 ft). The walls are in drystone.
Gate and gate piers, Overleigh Cemetery; 53.18250°N 2.89614°W		1848–50	The gates and gate piers were designed by T. M. Penson; the piers are in sandstone, and the gates in cast iron. There are six piers flanking a pair of vehicle gates, outside which are pedestrian gates, and outside these are railings. The piers are square, stand on moulded plinths, have blank shields on the front and back, and are surmounted by gabled caps.
1 Pyecroft Street; 53.18239°N 2.88909°W	—	c. 1850	A brick house with a slate roof in late Georgian style. It is in two storeys, and has three bays on Pyecroft Street, and one on Overleigh Road. The doorway has a simple case and a fanlight. The windows are sashes with wedge lintels.
1A and 3–37 Pyecroft Street; 53.18162°N 2.88866°W	—	c. 1850	A terrace of 19 brick cottages on a plinth with a slate roof in two storeys. Each cottage has a doorway with a flat hood, and sash windows. Originally there were no rear windows; windows and bathrooms have since been added.
2 Pyecroft Street; 53.18227°N 2.88924°W	—	c. 1850	A brick house on a plinth with a slate roof in late Georgian style. It is in two storeys. Above the doorway is a flat hood. The windows are sashes with wedge lintels.
55 Pyecroft Street; 53.18076°N 2.88827°W	—	c. 1850	A brick house on a plinth with a slate roof in late Georgian style. It is in two storeys. Above the doorway is a fanlight. The windows are sashes with wedge lintels. In the rear yard is a former privy.
2 and 4 St John's Road; 53.18545°N 2.88242°W	—	c. 1850	A pair of houses probably designed by James Harrison. They are in brick with slate roofs. The houses are in two storeys with projecting lateral gabled bays. On the end of each house is a small two-storey porch. The outer bays contain bay windows, and in the centre bays are three lancet windows. In the upper floor are triangular-headed casement windows.
Lodge, Curzon Park; 53.18009°N 2.89767°W		c. 1850	A cottage in painted brick with a Welsh slate roof. It consists of a two-storey single-bay block with a pediment, and a wing on each side. In the lower storey of the central block is a sash window, above which is a pediment, and there are three round-arched casement windows in the upper storey. The wings each contains a casement window.
Memorial to Samuel Venables; 53.18284°N 2.89527°W	—	c. 1850	The monument to Samuel Venables, who was master of the Bluecoat School for over 40 years is in Overleigh Cemetery. It is in stone, and consists of a plinth with a pediment, from which rises an obelisk. The memorial is about 4 metres (13 ft) high, and carried inscriptions about Venables' achievements. The memorial was restored in 1885.
Tavenor Tower; 53.18801°N 2.88109°W		c. 1850	A detached rendered house with a hipped slate roof. It is in two storeys, and has a four-bay front, the left bay being recessed. On the front is an Ionic portico, and a round-arched doorway with pilasters, a fanlight, and an entablature with a balustrade. At the rear is a bay window, and a slim tower with loops, a round-arched belvedere, and a pyramidal roof.
Tower House; 53.18259°N 2.90149°W	—	c. 1850	A rendered villa with a slate roof. It is mainly in two storeys, with a single-storey wing to the right, and a tower rising to an extra storey. There are balconies with French windows above the single-storey wing and the entrance; the other windows are sashes. To the left of the house are a former coach house and hayloft that have been converted into a cottage.
Trafford House; 53.18745°N 2.88361°W	—	c. 1850	A pair of villas in Italianate style. They are built in rendered brick with stone dressings, and have hipped slate roofs. The houses are in two storeys with attics, and have a front of four bays, with an added bay to the right. The windows in the lower floor are round-headed, those in the first floor are flat-headed, and above there are four gabled dormers. The round-headed porches are in the corners.
2 Curzon Park North; 53.18518°N 2.89202°W		Mid-19th century	A detached house, later divided into flats. It is built in brick, and has a hipped slate roof. The house is in two storeys. In the centre of the lower storeys is a portico with two pairs of columns, an architrave, a frieze, a dentil cornice, and a balcony. On each side of the portico is a round-arched window, and above it is a French window. The other windows are sashes. On the right side of the house is a full-length cast iron verandah.
Fernrock and Kinders; 53.18791°N 2.88163°W	—	1851–60	A pair of attached houses, Fernrock being slightly recessed. The houses are built in brick with stone dressings and slate roofs, and each house is in two storeys with a three-bay front. Both houses have bay windows and casements. Kinders has a round-arched doorway with a fanlight. Fernrock has an Ionic portico, and balconies with balustrades.
2 and 4 Victoria Pathway; 53.18529°N 2.88336°W	—	c. 1852	A pair of cottages probably designed by James Harrison. They are in brick with slate roofs, and are in two storeys. The doorways have fanlights, and both cottages have gabled dormers. The windows are casements.
6, 8 and 10 Victoria Pathway; 53.18502°N 2.88300°W	—	c. 1852	A row of three cottages probably designed by James Harrison. They are built in brick with slate roofs, and are in two storeys. Each house has a projecting gabled bay, with bays between them that are also gabled. The windows are casements.
7 and 9 Victoria Pathway; 53.18516°N 2.88256°W	—	1852	A pair of cottages probably designed by James Harrison. They are in brick with slate roofs. The cottages are in two storeys with projecting central gabled bays, flanked by porch bays between. Each cottage has a canted bay window; the other windows are sashes.
Manor House; 53.18544°N 2.88338°W	—	1852	A detached brick house with slate roofs in Tudor Revival style. It is in two storeys with attics, and has a complex plan with a front of three bays. On the front the left bay projects forward under a gable; there is a gabled porch and a canted bay window. The other windows are sashes.
Redcliff; 53.18805°N 2.88037°W	—	1852	Originally one house, extended in 1860, and later divided into two, it is in Italianate style. The house is stuccoed and has a slate roof, and is in two storeys. On the front is an Ionic portico. The original interior is largely intact. The garden was laid out by Edward Kemp, and the sandstone walls, piers, and other structures designed by him are included in the listing.
Monument to W. Brown; 53.18262°N 2.89505°W	—	c. 1852	The monument to William Brown, a member of the family who ran the drapery firm of Browns of Chester, is in Overleigh Cemetery. It consists of an obelisk in polished granite about 4 metres (13 ft) high. On the plinth is an inscription giving details of his charitable and public works.
Thackeray cenotaph and tombs 53.18186°N 2.89466°W	—	1852	The cenotaph to William Makepeace Thackeray, a Chester doctor and benefactor, is in Overleigh Cemetery. It is in sandstone, and in the form of an Eleanor cross. On the plinth is an inscription giving details of the doctor's life and achievements, and of the hospitals he served. The monument was restored in 1905. Included in the listing are two adjacent tombs. The doctor was the uncle of the novelist William Makepeace Thackeray.
Christ Church, Hough Green; 53.17956°N 2.91474°W		1855	The church was designed by James Harrison, and is built in sandstone with a slate roof. It consists of a four-bay nave and a lower, narrower, single-bay chancel. The entrance front at the west end contains double doors in an arched doorway above which are triple lancet windows.
8 and 10 Hough Green; 53.17991°N 2.90010°W	—	1850s	A pair of brick houses in Italianate style with stone dressings and a hipped slate roof. They are in two storeys, with an H-shaped plan. Between the projecting outer bays is a five-arched loggia, and the outer bays each has a single-storey canted bay window. The windows are sashes, and at the top of the houses is a cornice and a parapet.
15 and 17 Victoria Pathway; 53.18481°N 2.88219°W	—	c. 1855	A pair of cottages probably designed by James Harrison. They are in brick with slate roofs. The cottages are in two storeys with projecting lateral gabled bays, and porch bays between. Each cottage has a canted bay window; the other windows are sashes.
8 and 10 St John's Road; 53.18524°N 2.88221°W	—	1850s	A pair of houses probably designed by James Harrison. They are in brick with slate roofs. The houses are in two storeys with projecting lateral gabled bays. On the end of each house is a small two-storey porch. The outer bays contain bay windows, and in the centre bays are three lancet windows. In the upper floor are triangular-headed casement windows.
Monument to Richard Knill; 53.18174°N 2.89438°W	—	c. 1857	The monument to Richard Knill, a missionary and Congregational minister, is in Overleigh Cemetery. It is in freestone, and consists of an octagonal column with a spire finial standing on a plinth. The monument is about 3 metres (10 ft) high. Panels on the plinth are inscribed with details of his life, accomplishments, publications, and a biblical text.
Tomb and monument to Henry Raikes; 53.18294°N 2.89542°W	—	1857	The tomb and monument to Henry Raikes, chancellor of the diocese of Chester, is in Overleigh Cemetery. It is in sandstone and consists of an effigy on a table tomb under an arched canopy. On the tomb are panels carved with biblical themes. The monument was designed by T. M. Penson, and the carving was executed by Thomas Earp.
13, 15 and 17 Lower Park Road; 53.18816°N 2.87980°W	—	c. 1860	Originating as stables with a loft, the building has been converted into three dwellings. It is in brick with a slate roof. The building is in two storeys, and has an eight bay front. On the front are a former carriage entrance, a gabled porch, a Palladian window, and two gables. Most of the windows are sashes.
Cedar House; 53.18250°N 2.90112°W	—	c. 1860	A rendered villa with a hipped slate roof. It is in two storeys and has a front of six bays, the third and fourth bays projecting forward under a pediment, and the wider canted sixth bay also projects forward. There is an Ionic doorcase with an eared architrave, pilasters, and a segmental pediment. The rear of the villa overlooks the River Dee and contains three canted bay windows.
Monument to U. Larsing; 53.18177°N 2.89446°W	—	1863	The monument to U. Larsing, a Bengal missionary, is in Overleigh Cemetery. It consists of stone plinth over his tomb. The plinth is inscribed in English and in Welsh with details of his achievements.
Monument to Bishop John Graham; 53.18208°N 2.89480°W	—	c. 1866	The monument to the Rt Revd John Graham, bishop of Chester, is in Overleigh Cemetery. It is in sandstone, and consists of an octagonal column with a stiff-leaf capital on a plinth standing on two square steps. The plinth is inscribed with details about the bishop and his wife.
Rectory and associated buildings, St Mary's Church, Handbridge; 53.18291°N 2.89008°W	—	1885–87	The rectory and associated buildings were designed by Grayson and Ould. They are in red brick with pargeting, and have tiled roofs. The rectory is in two storeys with attics, and there is a former church hall and service wing to the right. There is a central doorway with an oriel window above. The lateral wings project forward, and each has a pargeted gable. At the rear are two two-storey bay windows.
Sexton's Cottage; 53.18304°N 2.88842°W	—	1887	A cottage designed by John Douglas and paid for by the 1st Duke of Westminster. It is built in red Ruabon brick with blue brick diapering and stone dressings. The cottage has slate roofs, and is in two storeys. The gable faces the road and contains mullioned windows. It is stepped and shaped, and has a ball finial. On the left is a porch with an ornate sandstone doorcase. The chimney has spiral moulded flues.
Wall, railings and gates, St Mary's Church, Handbridge; 53.18268°N 2.88891°W	—	1887	The wall, railings and gates were designed by F. B. Wade and paid for by the 1st Duke of Westminster. The sandstone wall carries ornate wrought iron railings. The piers are also in sandstone, the main ones being cross-gabled, and the other with simple gables. There are two gates for pedestrians and two for carriages.
St Mark's Church; 53.17906°N 2.91501°W		1892–93	The church was designed by T. M. Lockwood. It is built in red Ruabon brick with stone bands, and has Westmorland slate roofs. The church consists of a nave, a timber-framed porch, a vestry, and a chancel and a south chapel, both with an apse. There is a bellcote on the ridge of the nave.
Overleigh Lodge, screen and gates 53.17928°N 2.89569°W		c. 1893	These are located at the entrance to the Chester Approach to Eaton Hall and were designed by Robert William Edis for the 1st Duke of Westminster. The lodge is built in sandstone and brick with a roof of Westmorland slate. It is in two storeys, and has a T-shaped plan. Its features include shaped gables, mullioned windows (some also transomed), a circular stair turret with a conical roof, and an ornate central chimney. The gate piers are in stone with urn finials, and the railings and overthrow are in wrought iron with lanterns.
Boys Club; 53.18264°N 2.88844°W		1895	Originally a working men's club, this was designed by T. M. Lockwood for the 1st Duke of Westminster. It is in two storeys with an attic. The ground floor is in sandstone, the upper part is in brick with stone dressings, and the roof is slated. The building occupies a corner site, and has shaped gables on three sides. Facing the comer is a projecting full-height porch, to the right of which is a canted stair-bay. The windows are mullioned and transomed.
26, 28 and 30 Overleigh Road; 53.18161°N 2.89078°W		1896	A row of three estate cottages designed by John Douglas for the 1st Duke of Westminster. They are built in red Ruabon brick with blue brick diapering, sandstone dressings, and tiled roofs. They are in two storeys, and each cottage has a single bay. The door and window surrounds are in stone. The windows are mullioned with casements, those in the upper floor being in gabled dormers.
32–40 Overleigh Road; 53.18142°N 2.89123°W		1897	A row of five estate cottages designed by John Douglas for the 1st Duke of Westminster. They are built in red Ruabon brick with blue brick diapering, sandstone dressings, and tiled roofs. They are in two storeys, and each cottage has a single bay. The door and window surrounds are in stone. The windows are mullioned with casements, those in the upper floor being in gabled dormers.
Ebury House and St Mary's Cottage; 53.18281°N 2.88797°W	—	1899	A pair of cottages designed by John Douglas for the 1st Duke of Westminster. They are in red brick with blue brick diapering and sandstone dressings, and have slate roofs. They are in two storeys with one gable each. The doorways are in the centre with simple sandstone cases and carving in the lintels. The outer part of each cottage contains a door to the yard. The windows are mullioned.
Milepost, Eaton Road; 53.17651°N 2.88577°W	—	c. 1900	The milepost is in cast iron and consists of an octagonal post on a plinth 2 metres (6.6 ft) high. It carries a plate inscribed "CHESTER CROSS 1 MILE".
Milepost, Lache Lane; 53.17768°N 2.89931°W	—	c. 1900	The milepost is in cast iron and consists of an octagonal post on a plinth 2 metres (6.6 ft) high. It carries a plate inscribed "CHESTER CROSS 1 MILE".
Milepost, Wrexham Road; 53.17684°N 2.89655°W	—	c. 1900	The milepost is in cast iron and consists of an octagonal post on a plinth. It carries a plate inscribed "CHESTER CROSS 1 MILE".
4 Curzon Park South; 53.18140°N 2.90177°W	—	1905	A detached house built in brick and timber-framing with tiled roofs in free Vernacular Revival style. It is in two storeys and has a symmetrical three-bay. In the centre is a two-storey porch carried on Roman Doric stone columns. To its left is a single-storey canted bay window. In the upper storey is a five-light oriel window in the porch, and close-studded timber-framing. The other windows are casements. At the top of the porch is a gable with carved bargeboards.
Pumping station 53.18589°N 2.88927°W		1912–13	This was built as a hydro-electric generating station on the River Dee, and later used as a pumping station. It was designed to harmonise with the adjacent Old Dee Bridge, and is constructed in sandstone. On the front facing Castle Drive is an inscribed stone panel. The sides extend for three bays that are separated by buttresses and which contain pairs of lancet windows.
Lychgate, St Mark's Church; 53.17928°N 2.91522°W		c. 1920	The lychgate consists of oak framing on a sandstone base, with a stone-slate roof. The gates are also in oak, and there are wall plates, one of which is inscribed.
Carlton Tavern; 53.18295°N 2.88478°W		1920s	A public house in brick, partly stuccoed, with a slate roof. Its architectural styles are a mix of Georgian and Art Deco. The public house is in two storeys. On the front is a semicircular portico carried on two columns and two half-columns, flanked by two bow windows on each side. On the right side is a porch carried on two columns, with a bow window on each side. At the top of this front is a pediment. In the upper floor on both fronts are casement windows.
West Chapel, Overleigh Cemetery; 53.17978°N 2.89449°W		Early 20th cemetery	This was originally the Church of England chapel, and later used as an Eastern Orthodox Church. It is built in brick and has a slate roof. It is rectangular in plan, with a north aisle, a northwest tower, and an outshut to the south. The tower has a broach spire, and contains an open porch and a clock.
1–9 Handbridge, 1 Queen's Park Road, and 2–8 Mill Street; 53.18455°N 2.88766°W		1928–30	A row of twelve shops with flats above. They are in two storeys, and are designed in late Vernacular Revival style. One of the units faces Queen's Park Road, four are on Mill Street, and the rest stretch along Handbridge. The lower storey is in brick surfaced to resemble sandstone, and the upper storey is jettied and timber-framed with plaster panels; the roofs are slated. In the ground floor are shop fronts and paired doorways to the flats.
Lodge, Greenbank; 53.17496°N 2.88488°W	—	c. 1930	The lodge was probably designed by Charles Reilly. It is stuccoed, has a slate roof, is in two storeys, and has a symmetrical three-bay front. In the centre is a basket arch, and at the top is a broken pediment. Above the arch and in the lateral bays are sash windows.
Walls and gate piers, Greenbank; 53.17454°N 2.88495°W	—	c. 1930	The walls and gate piers were probably designed by Charles Reilly. They are in sandstone, the wall being approximately 1 metre (3.3 ft) high. There are three pairs of gate piers; the original gates and railings are lost.
Telephone kiosk 53.18251°N 2.88923°W	—	1935	A K6 type telephone kiosk, designed by Giles Gilbert Scott. Constructed in cast iron with a square plan and a dome, it has three unperforated crowns in the top panels.
Cenotaph, Overleigh Cemetery; 53.17991°N 2.89411°W		Undated	The cenotaph is a memorial to those who fell in the First World War. It is in white stone, and consists of a cross on a base of two octagonal steps and a plinth. The total height of the cenotaph is about 5 metres (16 ft). There is an inscription on the plinth.

== See also ==
- Grade I listed buildings in Cheshire West and Chester
- Grade II* listed buildings in Cheshire West and Chester
- Grade II listed buildings in Chester (central)
- Grade II listed buildings in Chester (east)
- Grade II listed buildings in Chester (north and west)
