= Overleigh Lodge =

Lodge in England

Coordinates: 53.17928°N 2.89561°W

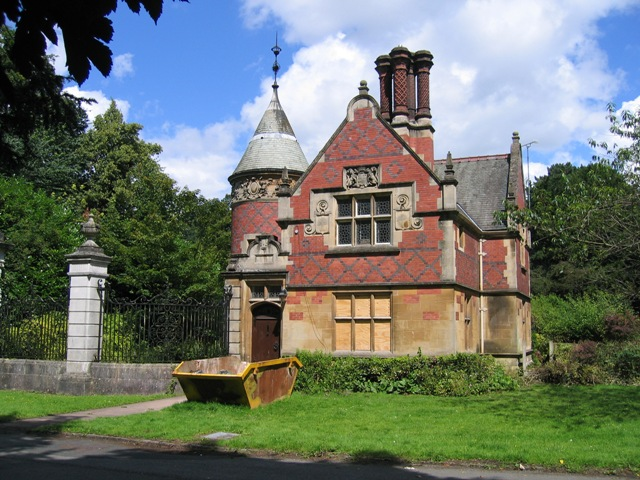
Overleigh Lodge

Overleigh Lodge is in Duke's Drive, Chester, Cheshire, England. The lodge, together with its associated gates, gate piers and screens, are recorded in the National Heritage List for England as a designated Grade II listed building. It was built at the entrance of the Chester Approach to Eaton Hall for the 1st Duke of Westminster, and designed by the London architect Robert William Edis. The approach has since been cut by the A55 road. The lower storey of the two-storey lodge is in yellow sandstone; the upper storey is in red brick with blue brick diapering and has a shaped gable. The roofs are in green Westmorland slate. The lodge also has a round turret with a conical spire, and an elaborate central chimney stack.

== See also ==
- Grade II listed buildings in Chester (south)
