= St Mark's Church, Saltney =

Coordinates: 53.1791°N 2.9151°W

- St Mark's Church, Saltney, in 2026

- Location in Cheshire
- OS grid reference: SJ 389 651
- Location: High Street, Saltney, Cheshire
- Country: England
- Denomination: Anglican
- Website: St Mark, Saltney

History
- Status: Parish church

Architecture
- Functional status: Active
- Heritage designation: Grade II
- Designated: 17 February 1994
- Architect: T. M. Lockwood
- Architectural type: Church
- Style: Gothic Revival
- Groundbreaking: 1892
- Completed: 1893

Specifications
- Materials: Brick with stone bands Slate roofs

Administration
- Province: York
- Diocese: Chester
- Archdeaconry: Chester
- Deanery: Chester
- Parish: Lache-cum-Saltney

Clergy
- Vicar: Revd Hennie Johnston

St Mark's Church is in High Street, Saltney, Cheshire, England. It is an active Anglican parish church in the deanery of Chester, the archdeaconry of Chester, and the diocese of Chester. Its benefice is combined with those of St Matthew, Saltney Ferry, and Sandy Lane Family Church, Lache-cum-Saltney. The church is recorded in the National Heritage List for England as a designated Grade II listed building.

== History ==
St Mark's was built in 1892–93, and designed by the Chester architect T. M. Lockwood. Due to its proximity to the England-Wales border with its parish boundaries crossing it, the church was entitled to take part in the 1915 Church of England border poll to see if the church wished to join the soon-to-be disestablished Church in Wales. The parish voted in favour of remaining part of the established Church of England.

== Architecture ==
The church is constructed in red Ruabon brick, with stone bands, and has Westmorland slate roofs. Its plan consists of a nave, a north timber-framed porch, a northeast vestry, a chancel with an apse, and a south chapel, also with an apse. It has a bellcote standing on the ridge of the nave rather than on a gable. At the west end are triple lancet windows flanked by buttresses. Around the church are more lancet windows. The bellcote consists of a tier of panels, above which is a tier of louvred bell openings, and a slated steeple surmounted by a weathervane. On each side of the nave roof are three louvred and gabled lucarnes. The stained glass includes some late work from the Kempe Studios designed by W. E. Tower.

== See also ==
- Grade II listed buildings in Chester (south)
