= Charlotte Sophia Burne =

English author, editor and folklorist (1850–1923)

- Born: 2 May 1850; Moreton, Staffordshire, England
- Died: 1923 (aged 72–73)
- Occupations: Author, editor and folklorist
- Organization: The Folklore Society
- Notable work: Shropshire Folk-Lore (1886)

Charlotte Sophia Burne (2 May 1850 – 1923), also known as Lotty, was an English author, editor and folklorist. She was the first woman to become president of The Folklore Society (FLS) and the first female president of any learned society in the country. She was the author of county folklore histories of Shropshire and Staffordshire.

== Life ==
Charlotte Sophia Burne was born on 2 May 1850 at Moreton vicarage in Staffordshire, near to the border with Shropshire, the first child of Charlotte Burne (née Goodlad) and Sambrooke Burne's six children. Her parents had arrived at the vicarage the day before, after leaving Loynton Hall on an ancestral estate in Staffordshire, as the guests of her uncle the Reverend Tom Burne. Her father was a country squire from a gentry family, of no fixed abode, and she was educated by governesses with her siblings.

The family moved to Summerhill, Edgmond, in Shropshire in 1854, having exhausted their welcome in Moreton. Her father received debilitating injuries in a hunting accident in 1857, causing to the family to move as the burden of his care was shared amongst the extended Burne family. Burne was sent to Loynton Hall for holidays, which was by then occupied by mainly unmarried aunts who reported that she was undisciplined. Her aunt Aunt Eliza Goodlad wrote in a letter in 1858 that: "I am astonished at her great difficulty in learning even the simplest things word for word, the sense she can get easily enough ... I think she has so many ideas on all subjects that they chase each other through her head and prevent her giving her whole attention to the thing in hand."

Lotty, as she was called, suffered several serious illnesses during her early years, including bronchitis and pleurisy. Conditions of ill health and obesity would impede her physical well-being throughout her life. Her father died in 1861 when she was a child.

== Career ==
=== Shropshire Folk-Lore: A Sheaf of Gleanings ===
By 1875, Burne had become friendly with writer and schoolteacher Georgina Frederica Jackson, having been introduced by the secretary of the Severn Valley Naturalists Field Club. Jackson was collecting material for her Shropshire Word Book (1879) and its companion work with the provisional title of "Folk-lore Gleanings" on "dialecting tours". A severe illness in 1877 meant that Jackson was forced to give up fieldwork, so Burne took over her material. She added her own collection of tales to produce Shropshire Folk-Lore: A Sheaf of Gleanings (1883), her first major work of over 600 pages.

The gleanings in Shropshire Folk-Lore included folk legends of giants and goblins; historic superstitions of bogies, fairies, ghosts, will-o'-the-wisp and witches; traces of well worship; notes on church bells; ballads and music; and the customary fairs, feasts, games, morris dancing and wakes of Shropshire. She included a description of the "Clipping the Church", a local Shrovetide custom where children join hands circle the outside of a church, which has similarities to a custom in Somerset.

The exhaustive collection was well received and continues to be favourably viewed, her obituary gave the remark "the first time the folklore of a county was published—at any rate in a form so complete and so scientific" and later folklorist and writer Katharine Briggs described it as "perhaps the best county folklore book we possess as well as the most monumental".

=== The Folklore Society ===
Burne joined The Folklore Society (FLS) in 1883. She became the first woman to become editor of the FLS journal Folklore, serving from 1900 to 1908. She was also the first woman to become president of the FLS, serving from 1909 to 1910, making her also the first female president of any learned society in the country. Her appointment to positions in the Society was unusual, having been previously held by the organisations London members. Burne's presidential address in 1910 was titled "The Value of European Folklore in the History of Culture."

Burne's written works include the large collection, Shropshire Folk-Lore (1886), and preparation of the second edition of the Folklore Society's official Handbook of Folklore (1914). She also contributed over seventy articles and reviews to its journals. A small amount of other material was published in newspapers and magazines. She provided information on the dialect of Newport in Shropshire to Alexander Ellis for his work Existing Phonology of English Dialects (1890).

Despite the firsts, penetrating gender and regional barriers, and serving the FLS for forty years, during a well-documented period of its history, details of her life and works are inadequately noted. Some correspondence of Burne with leading FLS members Alice Bertha and G. Laurence Gomme is contained in the Society's archives, but her personal papers seem to have been destroyed. A vague and inaccurate portrait of her life and works was given in references to her in Richard Dorson's History of the British folklorists (1968); J. C. Burne, het great nephew, drew on letters and recollections of her family to write a "tactful biography" which was published in 1975.

Burne's interest in history and antiquities, and subsequently folk-lore, was probably fostered by her mother. She was prompted by those connected to the family to compile a genealogical history of the Mildmay family, her first manuscript for this still exists, and the editing of the poet Richard Barnfield works. Her talents as an editor were initially recognised in Robert William Eyton's acknowledgements in his Doomsday Studies and the subsequent accolades in a local newspaper.

In the early 1890s Burne resided at Pyebirch, Eccleshall, in north Staffordshire. There she collaborated the local folklorist and folk-song collector Alice Annie Keary, of Stoke-on-Trent. Together they spent three years between 1890 and 1893 collecting materials locally in north Staffordshire. While a number of joint papers were published, Burne moved to Cheltenham around 1894, and the project failed to be realised in book form.

Burne's approach to the systematic collection of folklore gave emphasis to classification of material, and the means by which it was obtained. She wrote two essays on collection, and contributed to an ongoing discourse on fieldwork, proposing that the way she interviewed produced material uncorrupted by cautious retelling or embellishment. She also promoted the importance of documenting the historical and regional context of the tales, and accounting for the substitution and changes in the characters and incidents of these; their influence by economic, local, and personal factors is indicated in her earliest works and developed in her later articles and essays.

== Death and legacy ==
Burne died in 1923. An obituary was published in the FLS journal by Edwin Sidney Hartland.

Burne was the subject of an episode of The Folklore Podcast with guest contributor Nicola Stout.

== Select publications ==
- Shropshire Folk-Lore: A Sheaf of Gleanings (1883-1886)
- The Collection of English Folk-Lore (1890)
- Stafforshire Folk and their Lore (1896)
- Handbook of Folklore (1914)
