= Llandovery Town Hall =

Municipal Building in Llandovery, Wales

- Neuadd y Dref Llanymddyfri (Welsh)
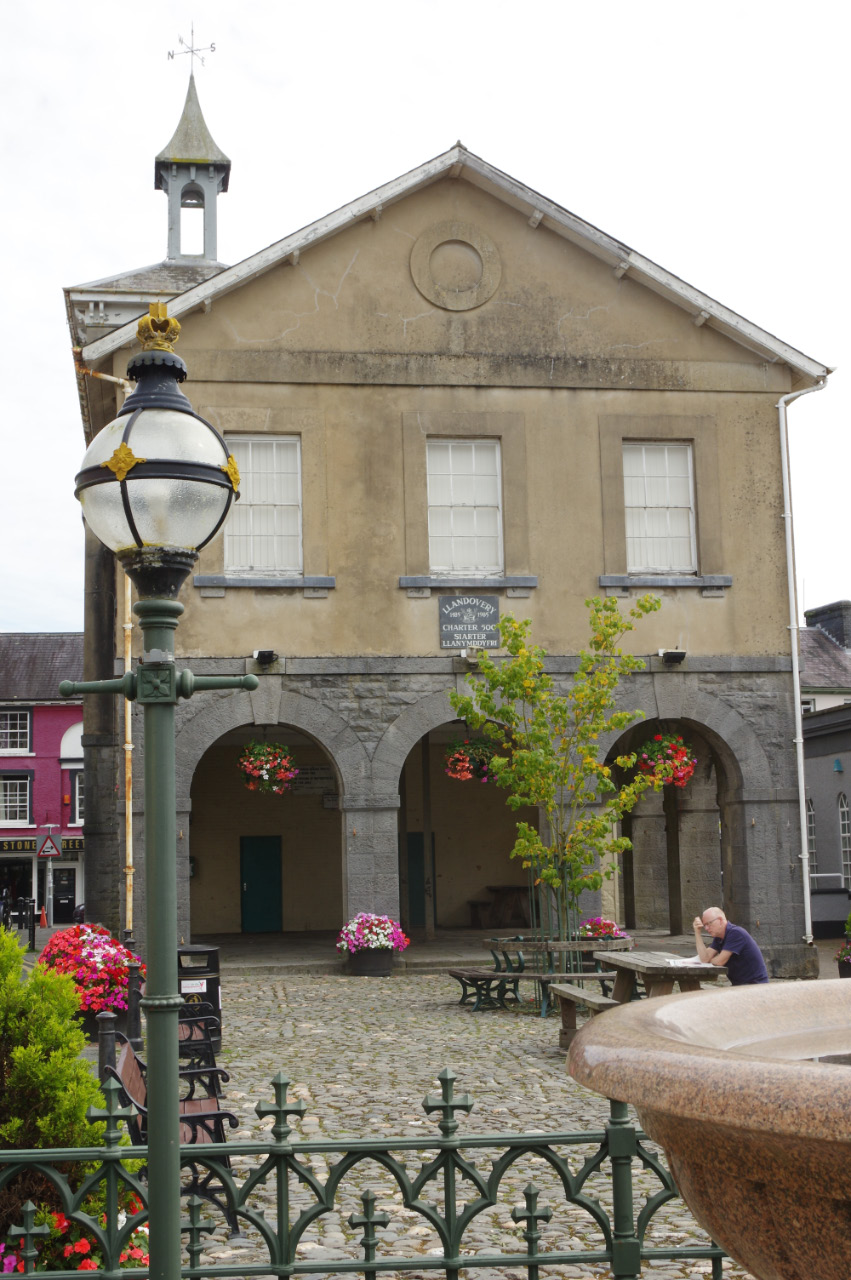
- Llandovery Town Hall

- Shown in Carmarthenshire
- 51.9942°N 3.7961°W
- Location: Market Street, Llandovery

History
- Built: 1858

Site notes
- Architect: Richard Kyrke Penson
- Architectural style: Italianate style

Listed Building – Grade II
- Official name: Llandovery Town Hall
- Designated: 8 March 1966
- Reference no.: 11003

Llandovery Town Hall (Welsh: Neuadd y Dref Llanymddyfri) is a municipal building in Market Street, Llandovery in Carmarthenshire, Wales. The structure, which is used as the local public library, is a Grade II listed building.

== History ==
The first municipal building in Llandovery was a town hall which was completed shortly after the grant of a charter to the town by King Richard III in 1485. After the building was found to be in state of disrepair, a second town hall was erected, using stone from the ruins of Llandovery Castle, in around 1535. A third town hall, on another site, was used for municipal purposes until the mid-19th century, but was being used as an ironmonger's warehouse by the early 20th century.

The current structure, the fourth municipal building, was designed by Richard Kyrke Penson in the Italianate style, built in stone and was completed in 1858. The ground floor was arcaded, so that it could be used as a corn exchange, with an assembly room for the use of the borough council on the first floor. The design involved a symmetrical main frontage with three bays facing southwest onto the Market Square; the ground floor, which was formed of coursed limestone, featured three openings with imposts, voussoirs and keystones, while the first floor, which was rendered, was fenestrated by three sash windows. There was a pediment above with a blind oculus in the tympanum. The side elevations stretched back six bays with the last two bays enclosed to form a lock-up for petty criminals. In the second bay from the left on the north side, there was a three-stage tower, with the first stage containing an arched doorway, the second stage containing a narrow round headed window and the third stage containing an oculus; the tower was surmounted by a bellcote with a pyramid-shaped roof and a weather vane. Internally, the principal room was the council chamber on the first floor of the main structure.

The building was restored to a design by the county surveyor, Daniel Phillips, in 1893. It served as the meeting place of Llandovery Borough Council for much of the 20th century but ceased to be local seat of government when the enlarged Dinefwr Borough Council was formed in 1974. The building was also used as a judicial facility throughout much of its life but the county court hearings ceased in the late 1970s, and the magistrates' court hearings ceased in 2011.

An extensive programme of restoration works, which involved the fitting of a disabled lift and improved fire-alarm systems to allow the first floor to be used as a public library, was carried out at a cost of £100,000 and completed in 2003. The town council secured planning consent to start flying a new town flag from the town hall in February 2022.
