= Georgina Frederica Jackson =

English writer and schoolteacher

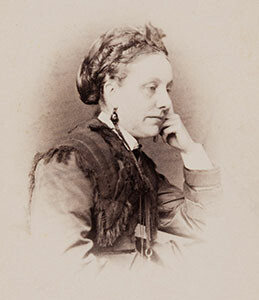
- Born: March 31, 1824; Everton
- Died: October 16, 1895 (aged 71); Chester
- Occupation: school teacher

Georgina Frederica Jackson (31 March 1824–16 October 1895) was an English writer and schoolteacher who compiled a glossary of Shropshire dialect.

== Early life ==
Georgina Frederica Jackson was born on 31 March 1824 in Everton, Liverpool. She was the fifth child of William Jackson, a wine merchant, and Dorothy Comberback. Her father was originally from Shropshire, and the family moved to rural mid-Shropshire by 1833 or 1834.

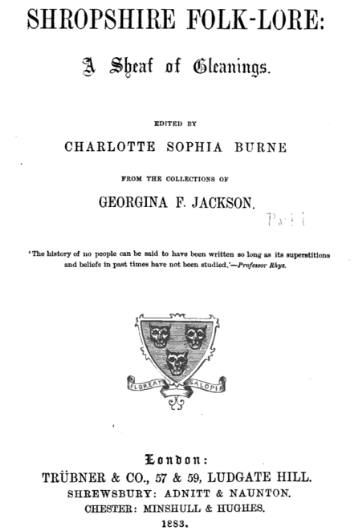
Shropshire folk-lore

By 1851, Jackson was teaching drawing in Chester to support her widowed mother. She rose to be a school teacher, and eventually ran a school for young ladies.

== Dialect work ==
In 1870, whilst running the school, she compiled a list of Shropshire dialect words she remembered from her childhood. A friend convinced her to increase the scope of her work. She spent her holidays travelling the county, collecting words, and wrote in the evenings. These 'dialecting tours' were a precursor of modern spoken corpora collection methods. She had amassed 3,000 words by 1873. She took advice from Walter William Skeat and Alexander John Ellis, two of the leading philologists in the UK. Skeat recommended she record the locality of each word and to use Ellis's glossic symbols. She spent the next four years revisiting her earlier work based on their advice.

In 1877, Jackson had to cancel her planned tour of south-east Shropshire due to illness.

The Royal Literary Fund awarded Jackson a grant of £100 in 1878 to prepare her work for publication. The Shropshire Word-Book, including a grammar, was published in three parts from 1879 to 1881 by Trubner and Co.

Jackson passed her notes on Shropshire folklore to her friend Charlotte Burne. Burne edited these and they were published in 1883, acknowledging Jackson's role in its creation.

== Later life ==
Jackson was granted a civil-list pension in 1880 which enabled her to retire from teaching. The ill-health that had prevented her last tour in 1877 meant she spent her last years almost entirely bedridden. However, she continued her dialect work, volunteering to help with the English Dialect Dictionary which drew heavily on her work.

Jackson died on 16 October 1895 in Chester, and is buried in the local cemetery.
