= U Larsing =

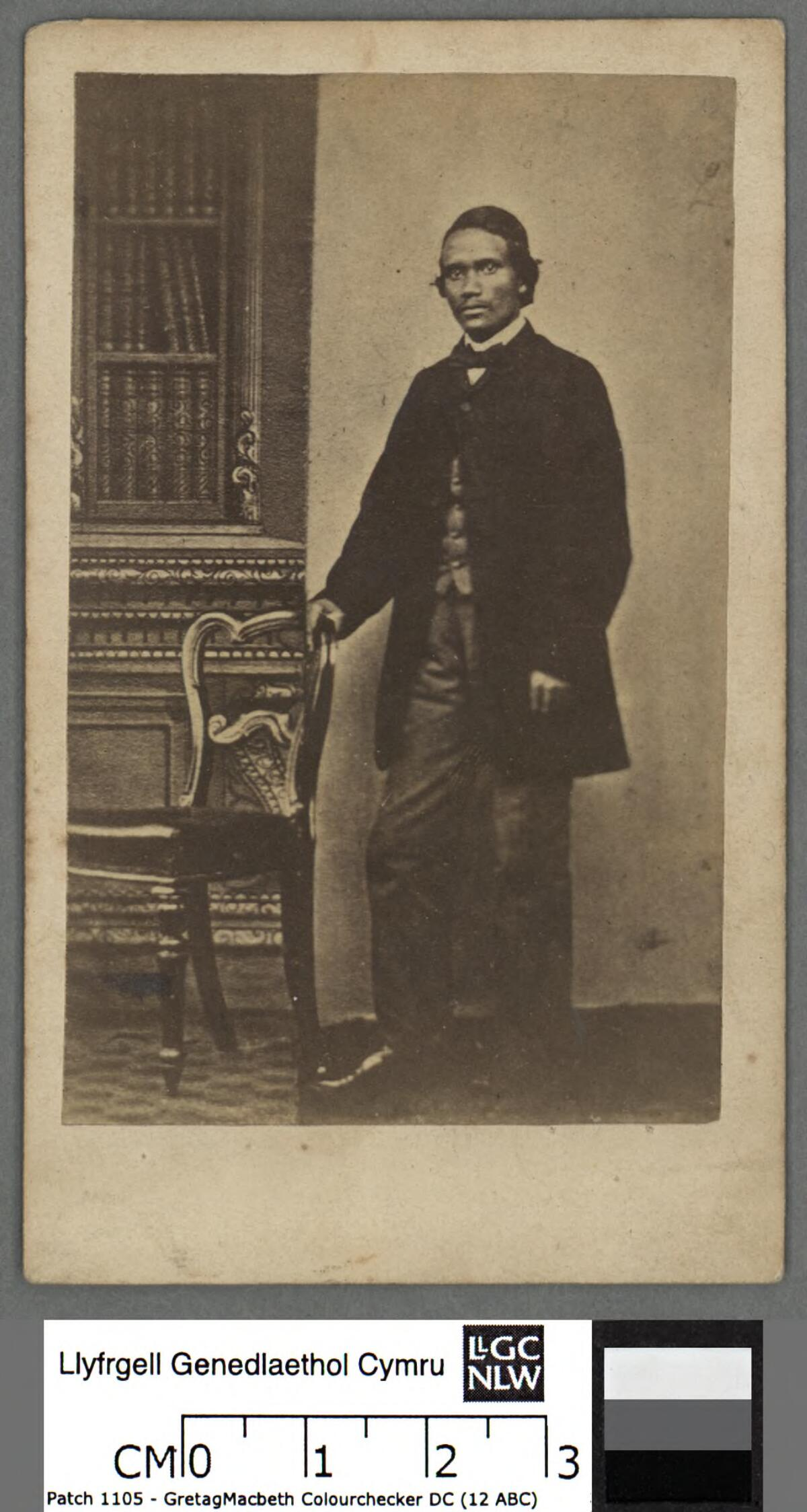
- Born: 1838; Mawsmai
- Died: 1863 (aged 24–25)

U Larsing (1838 - 1863), also known as Larsing Khongwir, was an Evangelist missionary who practiced in the area of the Khasi Hills, Meghalaya, India during the late 1850s and early 1860s. Additionally, he was the first Khasi Missionary to visit and preach in England and Wales during the early 1860s.

== Personal life ==
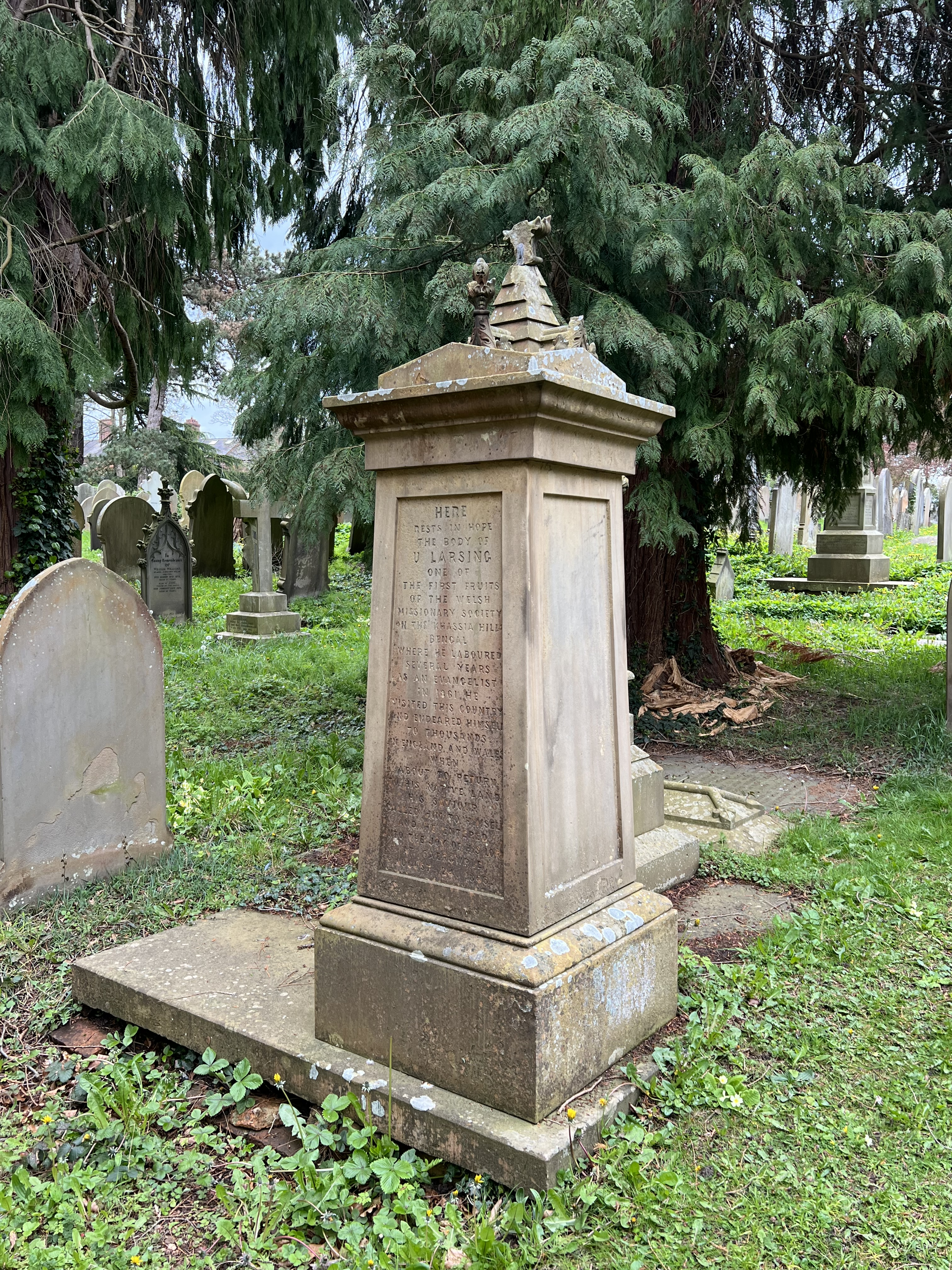
Gravestone

U Larsing, also known as Larsing Khongwir, was born in about 1838 in Mawsmai. His father was a trader, and U Larsing was the older of two children. His family followed the Animist religion.

== Missionary work ==
U Larsing became involved with the Evangelist movement when he studied at the Mawsmai Missionary School. After his parents' death he was supported by Reverend William Lewis, and his wife, Mary Lewis who were missionaries working in Nongsawlia. U Larsing was received into the Evangelist Church at Nongsawlia on 11 July 1849. Later, he was baptised at the school room, Shella on 5 October 1851.

U Larsing was stationed as a preacher at several locations, including Jowai, the principal village in the Jaintia Hills, and Shella, in the Khasi Hills.

An advantage of the local people being converted to missionary work was they were able to access areas others could not. However, an alternative viewpoint expressed during the era was such use of local people in this manner was exploiting them.

U Larsing's work as a preacher attracted the attention of the English and Welsh Evangelist Churches and he was invited to visit its members. He arrived at London on 27 May 1861. He was involved in a preaching tour throughout England and Wales, including venues in London, Llandeilo, Liverpool, Manchester, Menai Bridge, and Pwllheli. Subsequently, he stayed in Chester for three month. Later, he studied at the Holt Academy, near Wrexham under the supervision of Reverend Ebenezer Powell.

== Death and legacy ==
U Larsing died at Ty Cerrig, Caergwrle, Flintshire, Wales on 24 August 1863 whilst visiting the area doing missionary work. He was buried at the Overleigh Cemetery, Chester, Cheshire on 28 August 1863.

The inscription on his gravestone is in both English and Welsh and reads,

Here rests in hope the body of U Larsing one of the first fruits of the Welsh Missionary Society on the Khassia Hills, Bengal where he laboured several years as an Evangelist. In 1861 he visited this country and endeared himself to thousands in England and Wales. When about to return to his native land his saviour called him to himself and he entered into the joy of his Lord at Caergwrle August 24, 1863.

The gravestone was listed as Grade II on the National Heritage List in England on 23 July 1998.

A book titled U Larsing Evangelist from the Khasia Hills about his life and missionary was written by John Hughes Morris and published in 1912 in both the English and Welsh language.
