= Simon Radley =

British chef (born 1965)

- Born: 1965 (age 60–61); Manchester, United Kingdom
- Education: Catering course
- Culinary career
- Cooking style: Modern French
- Rating: Michelin star
- Current restaurant: Simon Radley at the Chester Grosvenor

Simon Radley (born 1965) is a British chef. He is a former executive chef of the restaurant Simon Radley at the Chester Grosvenor, known as Arkle. Part of the Chester Grosvenor and Spa hotel in the United Kingdom. Following Radley’s departure, the restaurant failed to retain its Michelin star in the 2022 guide after holding it for 30 consecutive years.

== Early life and career ==
Radley was born in 1965 in the English city of Manchester. While still a child, his family moved to Tring, Hertfordshire, where he lived until he was 16. He then completed a catering course at Crewe College (now known as South Cheshire College) and went to Mâcon, where he worked as a waiter for three weeks. Upon returning to England, he held a job in Wilmslow as a chef, before joining the Chester Grosvenor and Spa as chef de partie, in 1986.

Noted for having potential as a chef, Radley was encouraged to expand his experience and skills, and he therefore moved to London to work for a year at Inigo Jones, a restaurant in Covent Garden now known as The Forge, and run at the time by celebrity chef Paul Gayler.

In 1988, he returned to the Chester Grosvenor and, two years later, the restaurant was awarded its first Michelin star. Radley had further opportunities to expand his skills, spending time abroad in 1991 at the Peninsula Hotel in Hong Kong and the Mandarin Oriental in Bangkok. Closer to home, in 1994, Radley worked as executive chef at New Hall Manor in the West Midlands and later at the Nunsmere Hall Hotel in Cheshire.

== Career with Chester Grosvenor and Spa ==
After his four-year absence gaining experience in other establishments, Radley rejoined the Chester Grosvenor and Spa hotel in 1998. As executive chef and director of catering, he oversees all aspects of the hotel's restaurants, menus, and business catering, and recruits and manages a skilled team of chefs, apprentices and waiters. In recognition of Radley's success and expertise, Arkle was refurbished in the summer of 2008 and renamed Simon Radley at the Chester Grosvenor. In 2009, the restaurant was again awarded a Michelin star, its 19th in as many years and one of only five restaurants in the United Kingdom to have held the distinction for such an extended period. The restaurant failed to retain its Michelin Star in 2022’s guide following an extended period of closure due to the COVID-19 pandemic and the departure of Radley. The restaurant is set to reopen in mid 2022 following refurbishment, with Chester-born executive chef Elliot Hill taking the helm.
