= Greenbank, Chester =

Country house in Cheshire, England

Greenbank
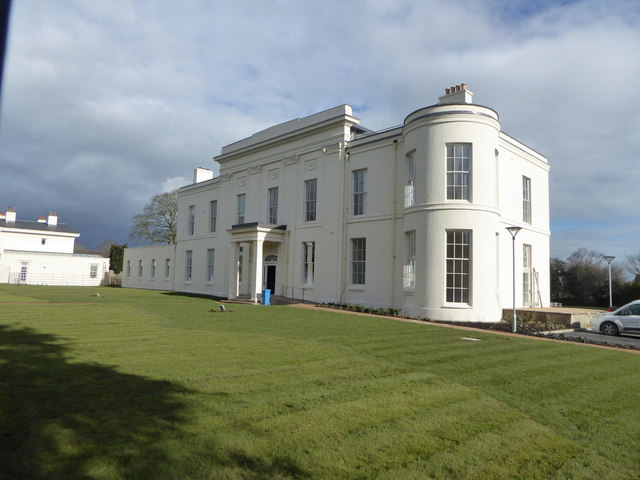
- The building in 2016

- Location within Cheshire
- 53.17460°N 2.88453°W
- Location: Handbridge, Cheshire

History
- Built: c.1820

Listed Building – Grade II
- Official name: Greenbank
- Designated: 28 July 1955
- Reference no.: 1375776

Greenbank is a former country house to the south of Chester, Cheshire, England. It was built in 1820 for John Swarbreck Rogers, a local glove manufacturer and mayor of Chester. From 1907 the house was occupied by Peter Jones, an Ellesmere Port businessman. He was a patron of the fine arts, who commissioned work from artists, and collected 18th-century furniture. In 1923 a doorway and a separate gatehouse were added, designed by C. H. Reilly. The building was converted into a college in about 1980. It is a stuccoed, flat-roofed building in two storeys with seven bays. The central three bays have a parapet higher than the others, giant pilasters, and panels decorated with garlands above tall windows. The architectural historian Nikolaus Pevsner describes it as "one of the best Georgian houses of Chester". The house is recorded in the National Heritage List for England as a designated Grade II listed building.

== See also ==
- Grade II listed buildings in Chester (south)
