= The Chester Grosvenor Hotel =

Chester Grosvenor Hotel
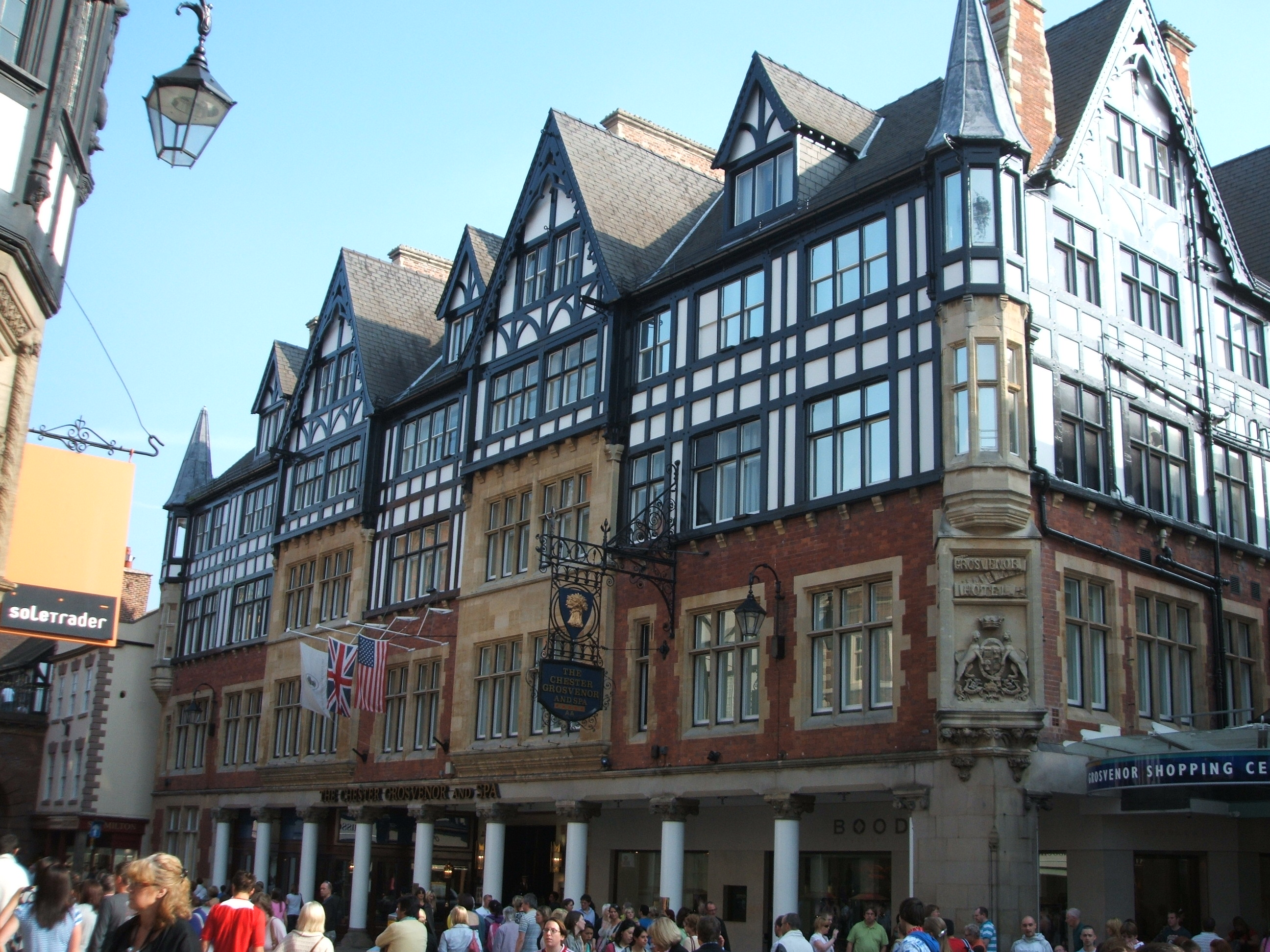
- Interactive map of the Chester Grosvenor Hotel area
- Former names: Golden Talbot, Royal Hotel, Grosvenor Hotel

General information
- Architectural style: Tudor Revival
- Location: Eastgate Street, Chester, Cheshire, England
- Coordinates: 53°11′27.11″N 2°53′18.31″W
- Construction started: 1863
- Completed: 1865
- Client: Richard Grosvenor, 2nd Marquess of Westminster
- Owner: Hugh Grosvenor, 7th Duke of Westminster

Design and construction
- Architects: Thomas Mainwaring Penson; R. K. Penson & Ritchie

The Chester Grosvenor Hotel is a hotel in Chester, Cheshire, England. The Grade II listed building was built between 1863 and 1865 and is owned by the Duke of Westminster.

The long-standing establishment features an on-site restaurant that was previously awarded a Michelin star since 1990, however the restaurant failed to retain its Michelin Star in 2022's Michelin Guide following an extended period of closure due to COVID-19. The restaurant has since reopened, and is in the process of being assessed for the absent Michelin Star. The hotel is now operated by Bespoke Hotels.

== Location ==
The Chester Grosvenor occupies a historic location on Eastgate, in the centre of Chester. It is next to the landmark Eastgate Clock and in close proximity to other notable features of the city, including Grosvenor Park, The Mall Chester, Chester Cathedral, and the ancient city walls.

== History ==
Before the present building was constructed in 1863–66, the site was occupied first by the pub The Golden Talbot and later by The Royal Hotel. The Golden Talbot was recorded as being "ancient" in its 1751 mention in one of the local weekly newspapers and had been in operation during the reign of Elizabeth I. In 1784, the pub was demolished to make way for The Royal Hotel, built by the politician John Crewe. It became the headquarters of the Independent Party, who were the party opposed to the Grosvenor family (later to become the Dukes of Westminster). In 1815 it was purchased by Robert Grosvenor, who was at that time Earl Grosvenor (and who later became the 1st Marquess of Westminster). It was then renamed the Grosvenor Hotel, and it became the city's "premier place to stay". While it was in possession of the 1st Marquess' son, Richard Grosvenor, 2nd Marquess of Westminster in 1863, this building was demolished.

The building now present on the site was originally called the Grosvenor Hotel. It was designed by the Chester architect Thomas Mainwaring Penson and was Penson's last major work. It was completed after his death by his elder brother's firm R. K. Penson & A. Ritchie. The hotel passed into the estate of the Duke of Westminster when Richard's son, Hugh Grosvenor, was advanced to 1st Duke of Westminster in 1874. On 10 January 1972, the building was designated as a Grade II listed building.

== Hotel and restaurant ==
The upper façade of the building is distinctive half-timbered black-and-white, in the Tudor Revival style that is typical of Chester architecture. As a hotel, it is recognised as offering five-star, luxury accommodation and service. The hotel has 68 guest bedrooms and 12 suites, a fitness centre, a spa, a lounge and bar, boardrooms, a Parisian style family restaurant La Brasserie and a highly acclaimed restaurant, Simon Radley at the Chester Grosvenor. Formerly known as The Arkle, the name of the restaurant changed in 2008 to reflect the success and expertise of its head chef, Simon Radley, who first joined the hotel in 1986. In 2013, the restaurant was awarded its 24th consecutive Michelin star. One of only four restaurants in the UK to have retained a star for that length of time, it is also the only restaurant in the north of England to have done so. Simon Radley at the Chester Grosvenor, formerly known as The Arkle, until 2022, it had previously retained its Michelin star for 30 consecutive years.

Notable guests include Princess Diana and several Princes of Wales. Queen Elizabeth II visited the hotel when it hosted wedding festivities for a daughter of the Grosvenor family.

== See also ==
- Grade II listed buildings in Chester (central)
