= Queen Hotel, Chester =

Queen Hotel
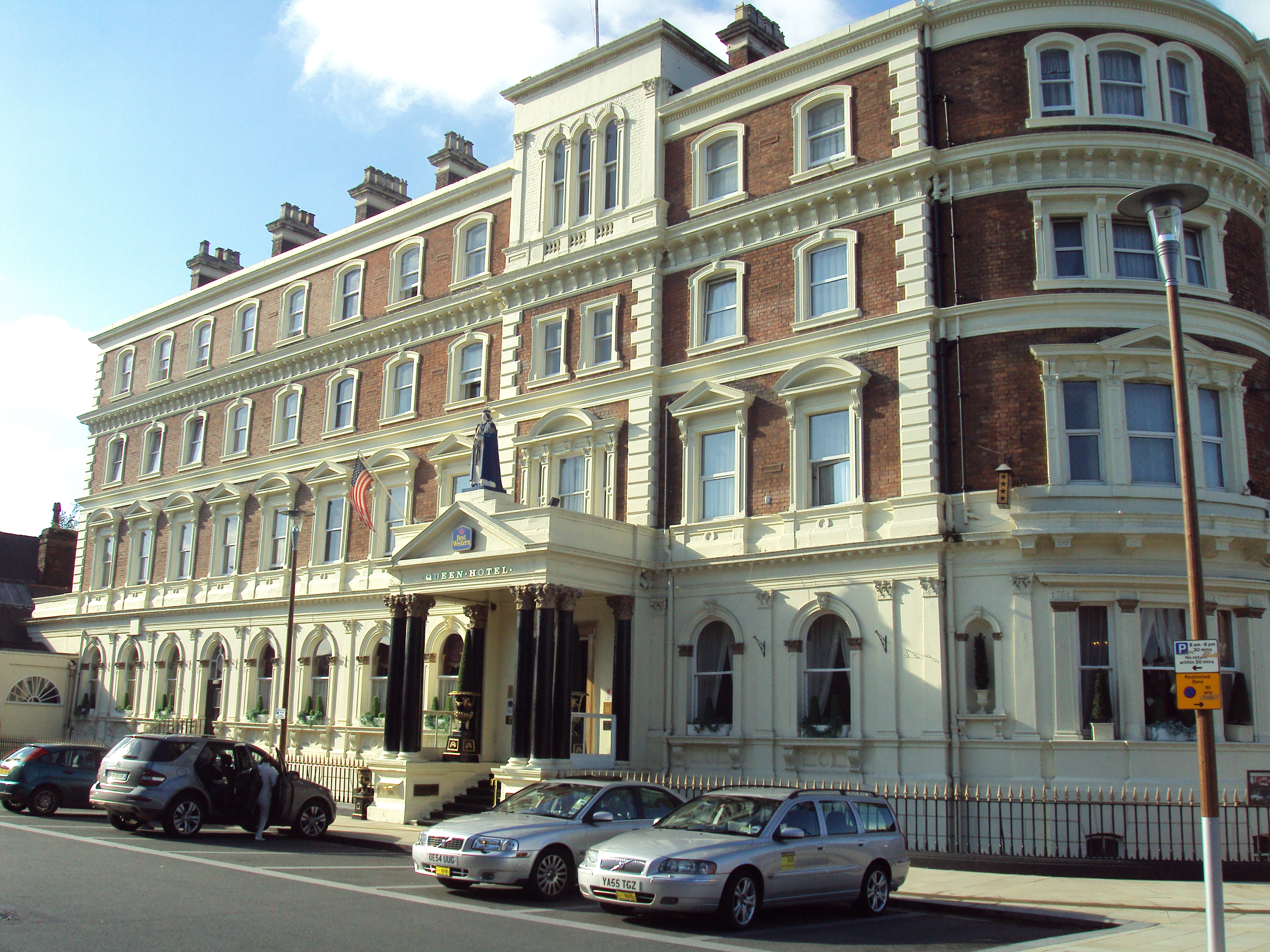

- Location in Cheshire
- 53.1962°N 2.8803°W
- Location: City Road and Station Road, Chester, Cheshire, England
- OS grid reference: SJ 413 669

History
- Built: 1860
- Rebuilt: 1862

Site notes
- Architect(s): T. M. Penson; Cornelius Sherlock
- Architectural style: Italianate

Queen Hotel is on the corner of City Road and Station Road, Chester, Cheshire, England, and stands opposite Chester General Station. The hotel is recorded in the National Heritage List for England as a designated Grade II listed building.

== History ==
The hotel was built in 1860, and was designed by T. M. Penson. It was intended to serve first-class railway travellers. Other travellers used the Albion Hotel (later the Town Crier) on the opposite corner. The two hotels were linked by an underground passage. Queen Hotel was damaged by fire in 1861, and was rebuilt to the same plan, but without its high roofs and viewing platforms, in 1862 by Penson and Cornelius Sherlock. An additional porch was added later to the City Road side.

== Architecture ==
Queen Hotel is constructed in brick and stucco in an Italianate style, and has a slate roof. The main block has four storeys and a basement, with eleven windows on the Station Road side, facing the station, one on the rounded corner, and eight on the City Road side. To the south, on City Road, is a lower wing with ten windows. A single-storey stable wing, now used for additional rooms, joins the east side of the hotel to the station. It has an archway for coaches, with four bays to the right and two bays to the left. On the Station Road side of the main block is a porch with Corinthian columns and seven steps leading up to the entrance. Standing on the pediment of the porch is a statue of Queen Victoria by Thomas Thornycroft. On the City Road side is another porch, constructed in Portland stone, and in Art Deco style.

== See also ==
- Grade II listed buildings in Chester (north and west)
