= Overleigh Cemetery =

Municipal burial ground in Cheshire, England

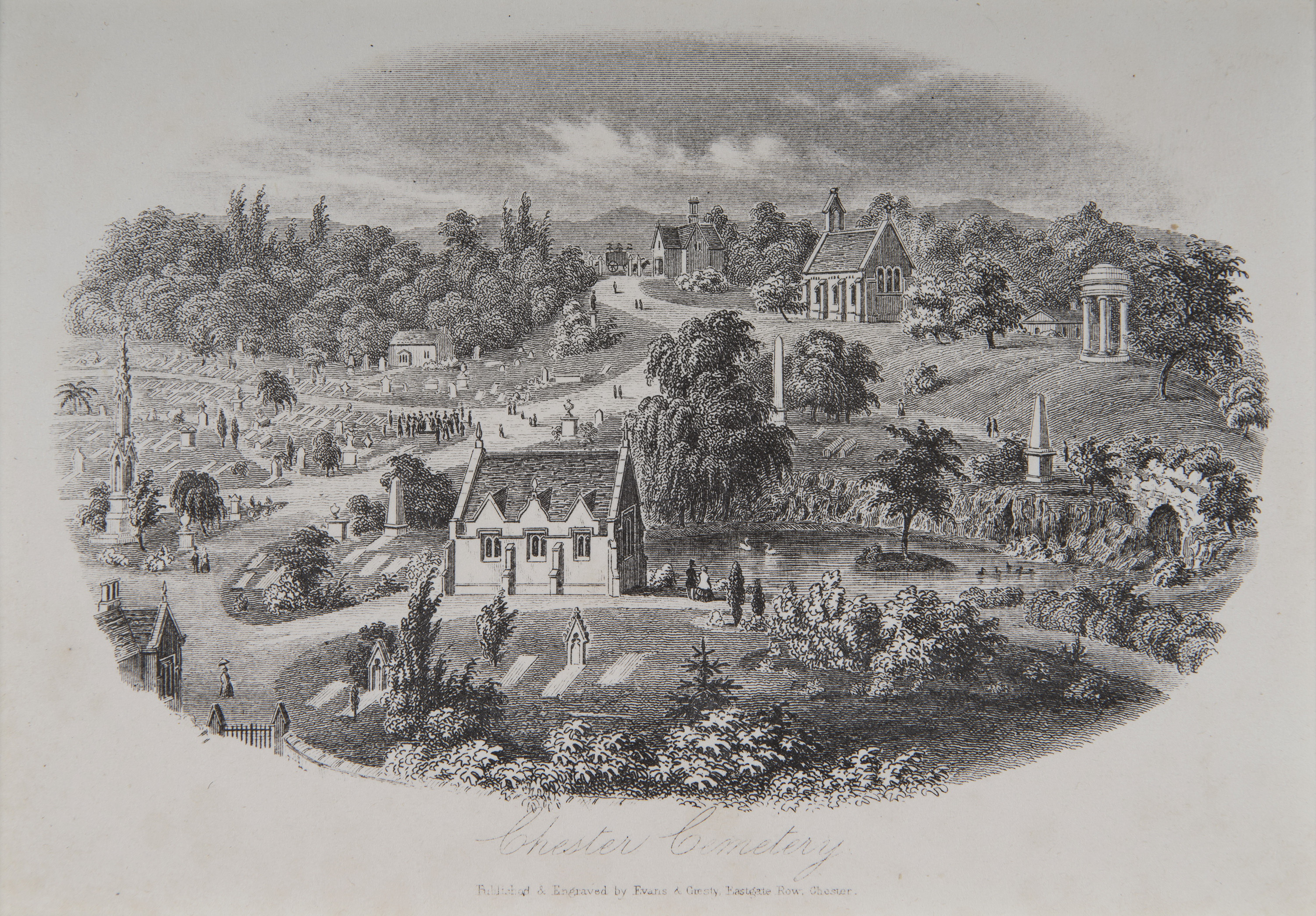
- Overleigh Cemetery in 1860
- Interactive map of Overleigh Cemetery

Details
- Established: 1850
- Location: Chester CH4 7HW
- Country: England
- Coordinates: 53°10′55″N 2°53′42″W
- Style: Victorian picturesque
- Owned by: Cheshire West and Chester Council
- Find a Grave: Overleigh Cemetery

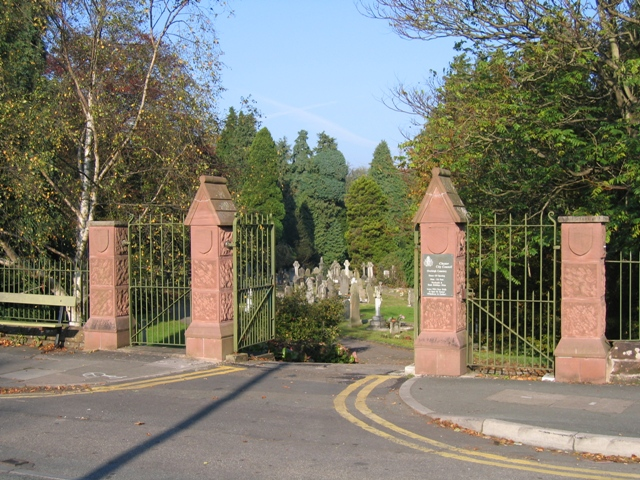
Original entrance to Overleigh Cemetery

Overleigh Cemetery is a large municipal burial ground adjacent to the approaches to Grosvenor Bridge on the south side of the River Dee in Chester, Cheshire, England. The cemetery was created in the mid-19th century by a private company but was taken into public ownership in the 1930s. The original part of the cemetery is listed at Grade II in the National Register of Historic Parks and Gardens. Since 2009, it has been owned and managed by the unitary authority Cheshire West and Chester.

== History ==
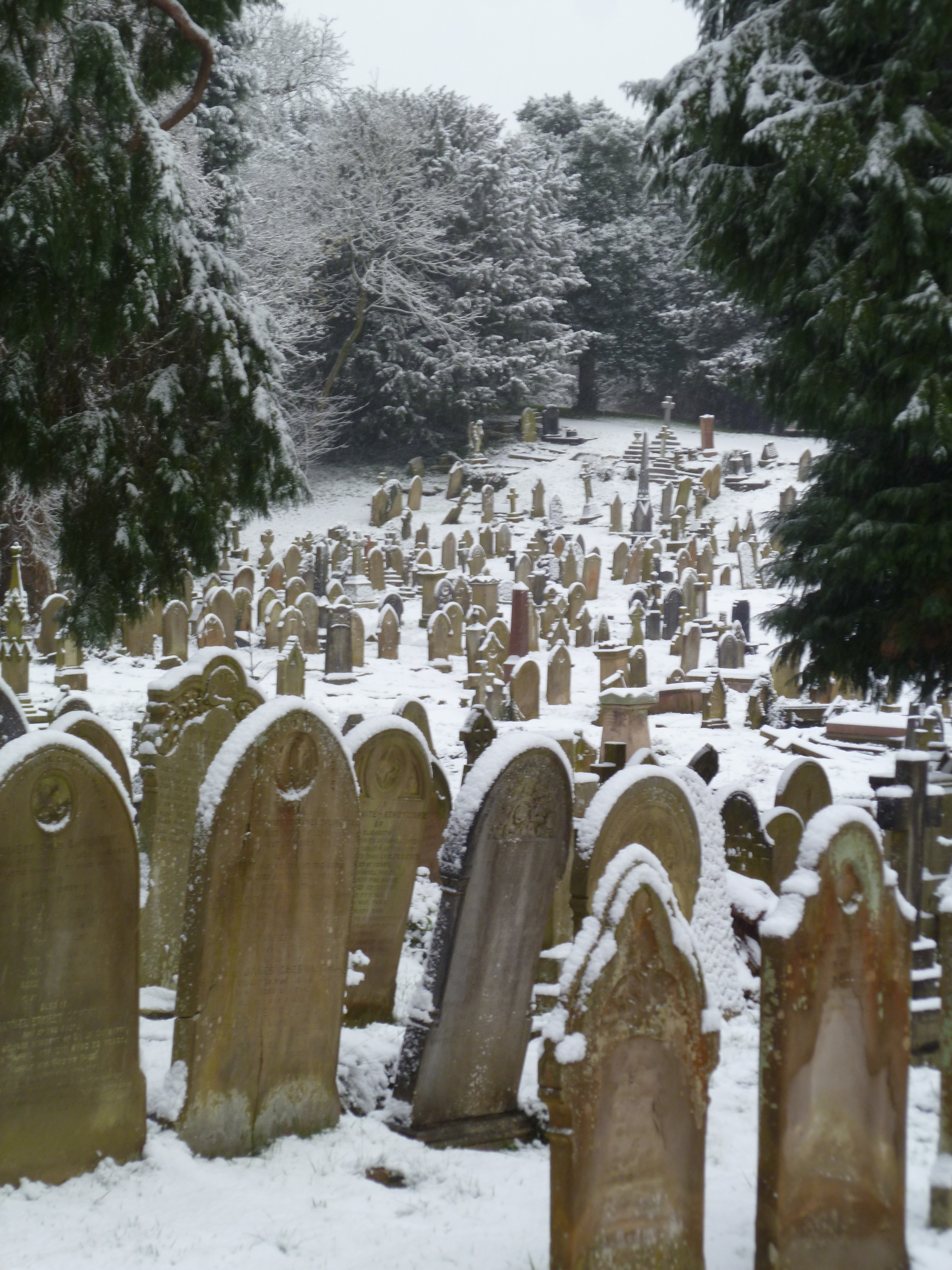
The original part of Overleigh Cemetery occupies about 11.5 acres (4.7 ha)

The cemetery was laid out between 1848 and 1850 by T. M. Penson. This original part of the cemetery to the north of Overleigh Road is described by the authors of the Buildings of England series as having been "highly romantic", and as still being "eminently picturesque". Overleigh Cemetery was a private development by the Chester General Cemetery Company; it was consecrated on 12 November 1850 by the Bishop of Chester; in 1875 it contained a lake with three islands, two chapels, two lodges, paths and trees, and a house for the chaplain. It was extended to the south in 1879 (this part is not included in the listing). The south part of the cemetery is described as being "prosaic". In 1930 the cemetery came into the ownership of Chester City Council, and it was further extended to the south during the 20th century. Penson's lake, lodges and chapels are no longer present. The West Chapel in the south part of the cemetery was built in 1904 and is Grade II listed. It fell into disuse and is now the Greek Orthodox Church of St Barbara the Great Martyr.

== Notable structures ==
The gates and gate piers designed by Penson at the original entrance to the cemetery are still present, and are recorded in the National Heritage List for England as a designated Grade II listed building. Also listed at Grade II is a bridge over the drive in the north section of the cemetery, which was designed by Penson. In the north part of the cemetery, and listed at Grade II, are the following monuments: to John Graham, Bishop of Chester who died in 1865, to William Makepeace Thackeray (1769–1849), uncle of the novelist of same name, to U Larsing, a missionary to Bengal, who died in 1863, to Revd Richard Knill, who died in 1857, and his wife, who died in 1870, to Samuel Venables, master of Chester Bluecoat School, who died in 1848, to William Brown of Browns of Chester, who died in 1852, and to Henry Raikes, Chancellor of the diocese of Chester (designed by Penson, with an effigy by Thomas Earp). In the south part of the cemetery is a monument to Frederick Coplestone who died in 1932. It dates from 1934, was designed and carved by Eric Gill, and is listed at Grade II*. Also in the south part of the cemetery, and listed at Grade II, are the west chapel, and a cenotaph, in form of a Cross of Sacrifice, to those who died in the First World War and are buried in the cemetery.

The chapel is currently used by the Greek Orthodox Community of St. Barbara.

The poet Elen Egryn, the first woman to publish a book in Welsh, was buried in the cemetery in 1876; her grave is not listed. Another notable gravestone in the cemetery, but not listed, is that of Edward Langtry (estranged first husband of actress Lily Langtry), who died in a local lunatic asylum in 1897. Also buried in the cemetery and without listed gravestones are the writer Georgina Frederica Jackson, who compiled a glossary of Shropshire dialect and died in 1895, and Chester architect John Douglas who died in 1911.

Another notable gravestone in the cemetery, with an epitaph "Far From The Bones Of His Ancestors" in both English and Japanese, is that of the Japanese actor Ishiao Ishimura, one of the acting team "The Mikado Family", who died on stage in December 1915 in the Royalty Theatre in Chester when he fell and broke his neck.

== Graves ==
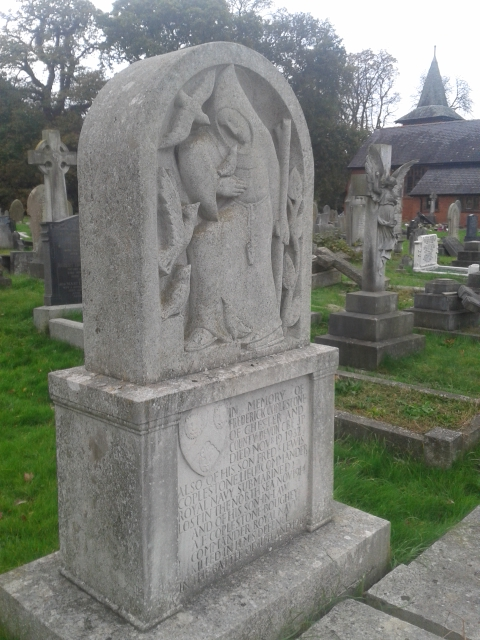
Frederik Copelston Memorial

The Overleigh Cemetery database lists details of over 60,000 burials. Photographs of some of the more notable memorials are given on the Chester Walls website. The cemetery contains the graves of 197 Commonwealth service personnel, 127 from the First World War (about half of them burials from local hospitals,) and 69 from the Second. Apart from a small war graves plot containing 32 graves from both wars, the graves are dispersed throughout the cemetery.
