= Richard Kyrke Penson =

Welsh architect (1815–1885)

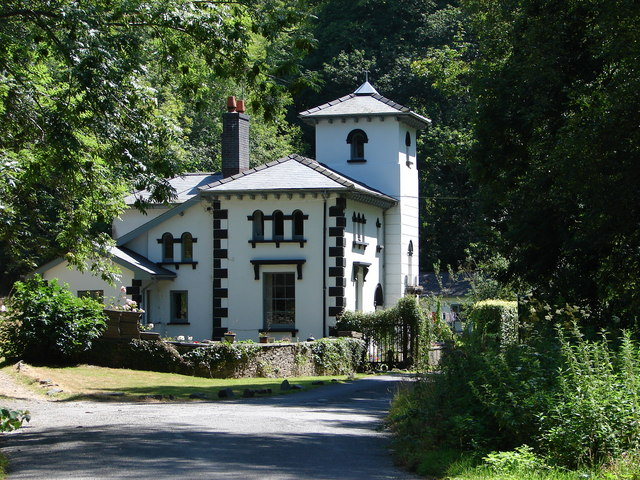
- Nanteos Lodge by the architect R. K. Penson, 1857
- Born: 19 June 1815; Overton-on-Dee, Flintshire, Wales
- Died: 22 May 1885 (aged 69); Plas Dinam, Ludlow, Shropshire, England
- Education: Oswestry School, Shropshire, England
- Occupation: Architect
- Father: Thomas Penson II
- Practice: Penson & Son; R. K. Penson and A. Ritchie
- Buildings: Provincial Welsh Insurance Company Office, Wrexham
- Projects: Cilyrychen lime kilns, Llandybie

Richard Kyrke Penson or R. K. Penson (19 June 1815 – 22 May 1885) was a Welsh architect and artist.

Richard Kyrke Penson was a leading Gothic Revival architect. His work, covered the counties of Pembrokeshire, Carmarthenshire, Cardigan, Denbighshire, Montgomeryshire in Wales and Shropshire and Cheshire in England. His work consisted mainly of Anglican churches, church schools and church restorations, of which over 35 were in south-west Wales However he was not restricted to church architecture and he was responsible for the remarkable group of kilns for lime burning at Llandybie and also commercial buildings such as the Provincial Welsh Insurance Company Office in the High Street in Wrexham. He was also a notable exponent of Italianate style of villa and Palazzo architecture in Wales.

== Life and career ==
He was born at Overton-on-Dee, Flintshire, Wales, in 1815, the eldest son of Thomas Penson II, an architect and surveyor of Gwersyllt Hall near Wrexham, who had offices in Willow Street, Oswestry, and his wife Frances (nee Kirk). He was the brother of Thomas Mainwaring Penson, an architect noted for his railway stations and Tudor Revival architecture. R. K. Penson was educated at Oswestry School and then trained as an artist in London. He exhibited at the Royal Academy in 1836 and 1839, but by 1841 had returned to Oswestry. He joined his father's architectural firm and entered into partnership with his father in 1844. However, he left the partnership shortly afterwards to set up his own practice. He was working from Oswestry in 1854. He expanded his practice in the 1850s setting up at Ferryside in Carmarthenshire and forming a partnership with A. Ritchie at Swansea. He built house for himself close to his limeworks at Llandybie in Carmarthenshire. Around 1860 he set up an office at 27 Newgate Street Chester. He became an associate of the RIBA in 1849 and a fellow in 1861.

Penson was appointed county surveyor for Cardiganshire and Carmarthenshire in 1850. He followed his father as county surveyor of Montgomeryshire from 1859 to 1861 and of Denbighshire in 1861. He was to retire from his practice in 1864, although he completed unfinished projects started by his brother, T. M. Penson, who had pre-deceased him. He also became the diocesan architect for St Davids around 1850. In 1871 he was living at Cilyrychen, Llandybie, Carmarthenshire, in Wales. Penson continued to exhibit at the Royal Academy between 1856 and 1859. He was a leading early member of the Cambrian Archaeological Association and was elected a member of the Society of Antiquaries of London in 1853. Sometime after his retirement, possibly after 1871, he had moved to Plas Dinam House in Ludlow, Shropshire, where he died, aged 69, on 22 May 1885.

=== Penson's Italianate style architecture ===
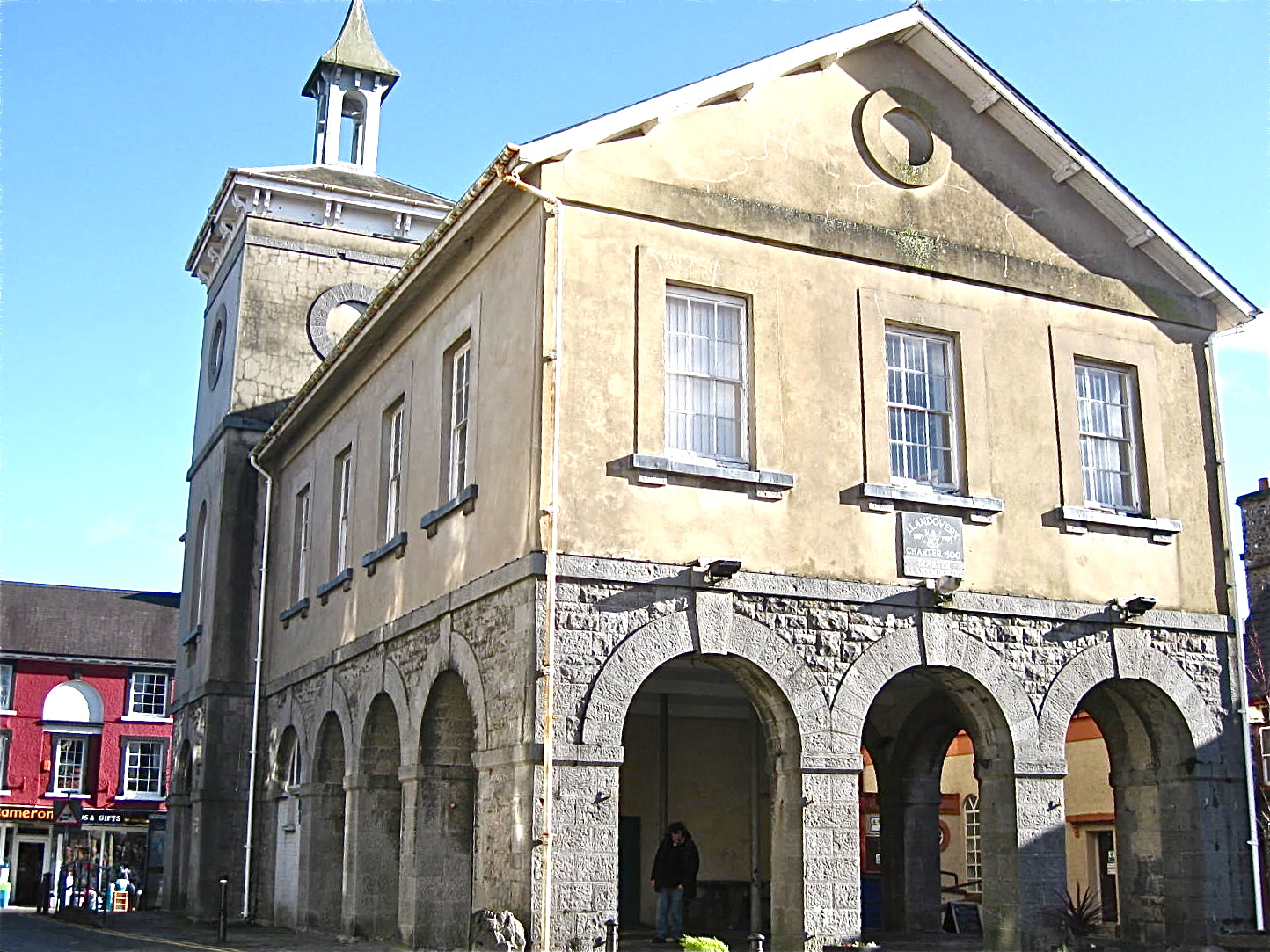
Llandovery Town Hall, by R. K. Penson, 1857-1858

Prompted by Queen Victoria's Osborne House which was completed in 1851, the Italianate style of architecture became popular in the second half of the 19th century. Features of this style include belvedere towers and roofs with a shallow slope and wide eaves. Examples of Penson's use of the Italianate style include Llandovery Town Hall and the gate lodge to Nanteos. The style was popular for country houses in Carmarthenshire and include the now-demolished Pant Glas at Llanfynydd and Gellideg at Llandyfaelog. A further example of Penson's Italianate style is the Alliance Assurance Company, in the High Street, Wrexham. Designed by Richard Kyrke Penson, in the baroque palazzo style and built in 1860–61.

== Works include ==
=== Houses ===
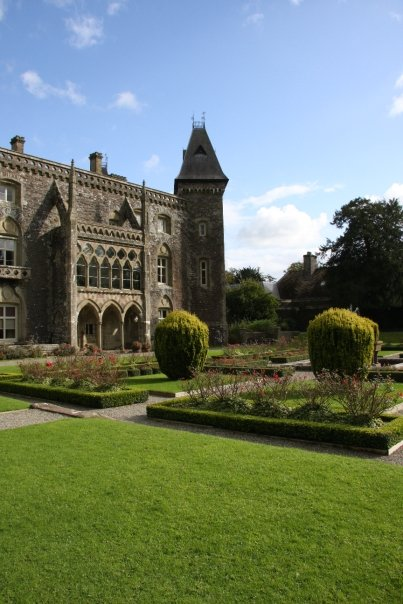
Newtown House showing Gothic additions and rectangular towers added by Penson

Bronwydd Castle ruins

- Bronwydd, a 'sham castle' built around an earlier house by the esteemed Gothic Revival architect. Designed by Penson for Sir Thomas Lloyd. It has been empty since not long after the Second World War and has now largely collapsed through neglect. The ruins stand on the bank of the Afon Cynllo
- Newtown House, formerly Plas Dinefwr Llandeilo, Carmarthenshire. Restoration house built 1660-70 for Sir Edward Rice, a descendant of Rhys apThomas; possibly occupying the site of the Tudor house. Refitting of interior and Georgian door cases etc. added c. 1720. Victorian Gothic recessing with diagonal turrets and other additions by R. K. Penson in 1856-1857.
- Gate Lodge to Nanteos, Ceredigion

=== Public buildings ===
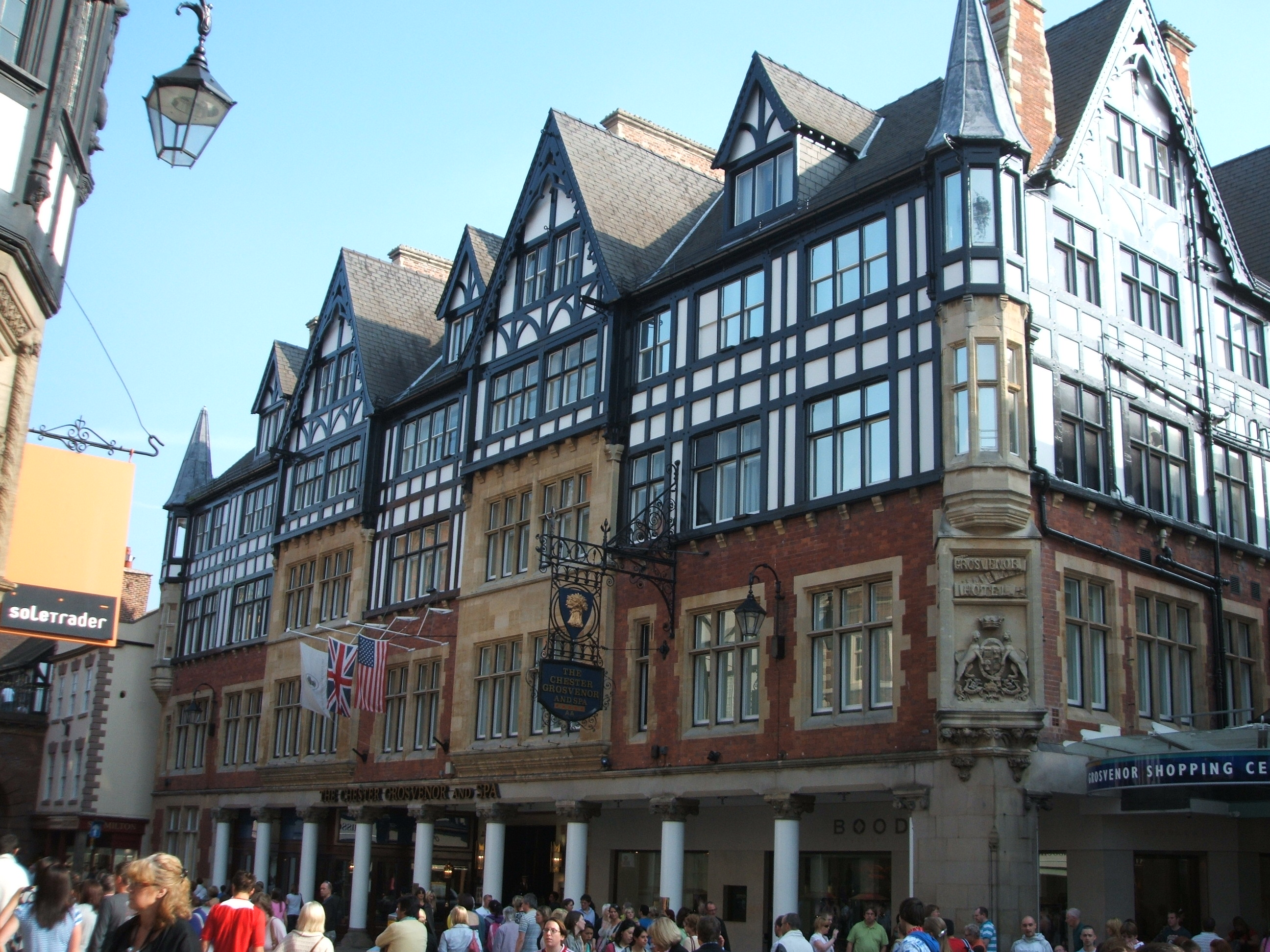
Grosvenor Hotel, Chester

- Wrexham Provincial Welsh Insurance Company (Alliance Assurance Company), High Street]. Designed by Richard Kyrke Penson, in the Italian palazzo style and built in 1860–61 for the Provincial Welsh Insurance Company. The insurance offices were on the upper floors of the building, with the ground floor occupied by the North & South Wales Bank. The Provincial Welsh and its successors occupied the building till the 1990s. Since then, the building has been occupied by Yates. The Provincial Welsh Insurance Company was established in Wrexham in 1852. The Alliance Assurance Company took over between 1874 and 1899, and it is this name which still appears on the front of the building today.
- Grosvenor Hotel, Chester. It was designed by the Chester architect Thomas Mainwaring Penson brother of R. K. Penson. It was completed after his death by Penson & Ritchie.

=== Churches ===
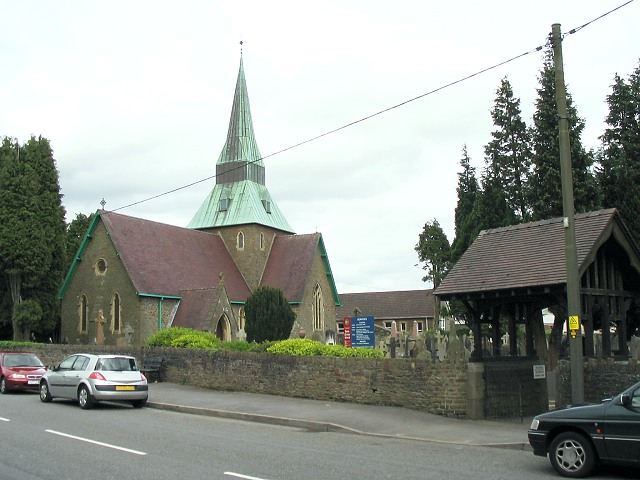
Holy Trinity church, Felinfoel – geograph.org.uk – 177109

Carmarthenshire

- Felinfoel. Holy Trinity Church 1857–58.

Glamorgan

- Llanrhidian, Gower

Montgomeryshire

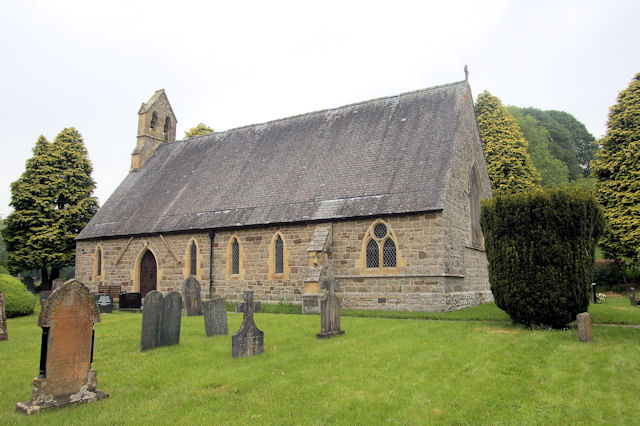
St John The Evangelist church Pontrobert, 1853

- Pontrobert (1853) The Church of St. John the Evangelist, The church was built in 1853 following the formation of the new parish to designs by Richard Kyrke Penson. The church is in the Deanery of Ceirienion, the Archdeaconery of Montgomery and the Diocese of St Asaph. The church has well proportioned gable ends and slates meeting the walls without a coping. Simple Early English style with a west bellcote, and interior without structural division. The roof has arched braces resting on low imposts.
- Penybontfawr (1855).

=== Works as county surveyor ===
- Designed Cilcewydd Bridge (1861), Montgomeryshire.

=== Lime kilns ===
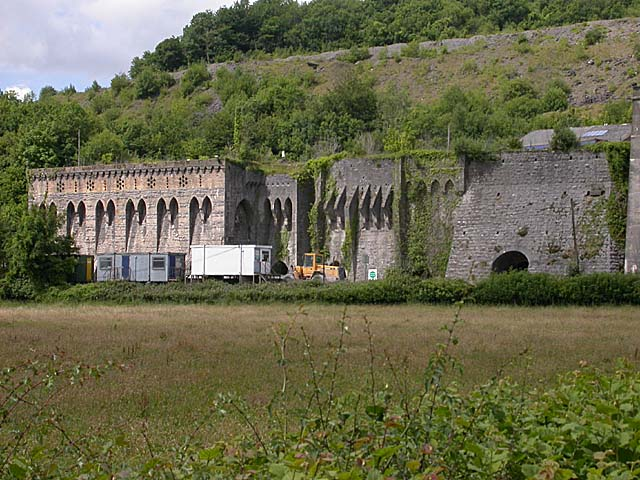
Llandybie lime kilns

- Cilyrychen lime kilns, built by Richard Kyrke Penson in 1858, and still visible today from the main Llandybie to Llandeilo road. The Cilyrychen lime kilns were designed by Penson who leased the quarries from Lord Dynevor in April 1856. The opening of the Llanelly Railway in 1857 encouraged an increase in quarrying and limeburning in the area. The original bank of six kilns was built between August 1856 and June 1858 at a cost of £3,460 19s 1d, and the first kiln was lit on 18 May 1857. By 1900 there were nine kilns, 50 feet high and capable of producing 20 tons of lime per day. After Penson's death the firm was continued by his widow in partnership with F G Southern. The firm continued to expand until competition with the neighbouring firm at Pentregwenlais led to overproduction; in 1906 the firms merged as Lime Firms Ltd. A three-arch group of two large kilns, of plain design in concrete, was later added at the north end of the group bringing the total to ten. The burning of lime at this site ceased in 1973.

== Literature ==
- Antonia Brodie (ed), Directory of British Architects, 1834–1914: 2 Vols, British Architectural Library, Royal Institute of British Architects, 2001
- Jenkins D. E. (n.d.), The Penson Dynasty: Building on the Welsh Border, 1822–1859. Oswestry Civic Society.
- R. W. D. Fenn (1997) R K Penson, Architect, Water-colourist and Lime Burner Tarmac Papers I pp. 67–98
- R. Scourfield and R. Haslam (2013) The Buildings of Wales: Powys; Montgomeryshire, Radnorshire and Breconshire. Yale University Press.
- I. C. Thomas, (1997) The Development of a Victorian Enterprise, R K Penson and the Cilyrychen Lime Works Tarmac Papers I pp. 99–119

== See also ==
- Architecture of Wales
