= Crypt Chambers =

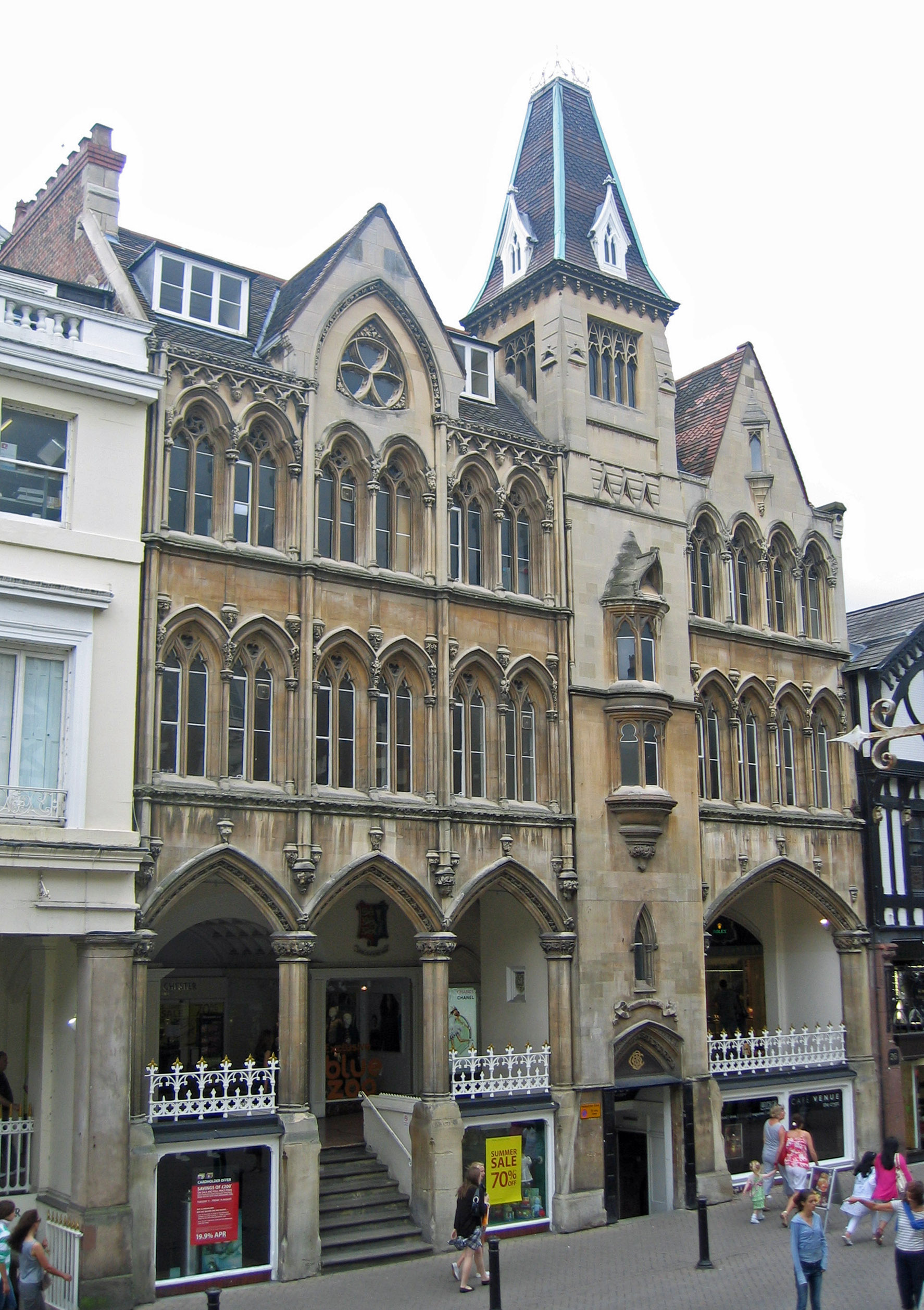
- Crypt Chambers

- Location in Cheshire
- 53.19046°N 2.89031°W
- Location: 28–34 Eastgate Street and 34–40 Eastgate Row, Chester, Cheshire, England
- OS grid reference: SJ 406,663

History
- Built: 1858
- Built for: William and Charles Brown

Site notes
- Architect: T. M. Penson
- Architectural style: Gothic Revival

Listed Building – Grade I
- Official name: No.28 Street and No.34 Row (Crypt Building)
- Designated: 28 July 1955

Crypt Chambers (or Crypt Building) is at 28–34 Eastgate Street and 34–40 Eastgate Row, Chester, Cheshire, England. It is recorded in the National Heritage List for England as a designated Grade I listed building and incorporates a section of the Chester Rows.

== History ==
Crypt Chambers is built on the site of a medieval house whose undercroft is still present. The present building was constructed in 1858 to a design by T. M. Penson. It was built as a department store for William and Charles Brown of the Browns of Chester family of drapers.

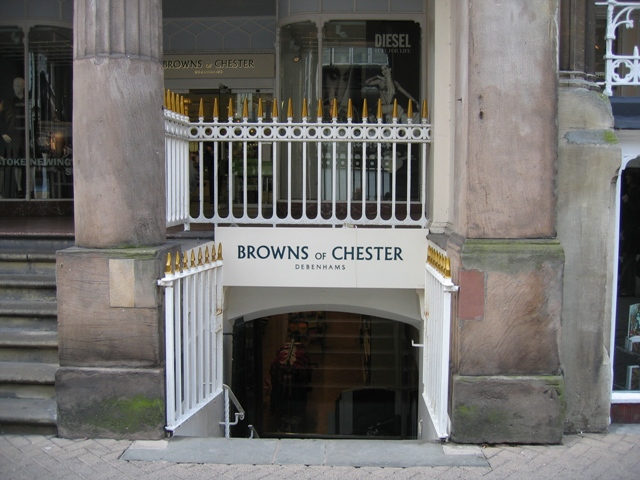
Entrance to the undercroft

== Architecture ==
=== Exterior ===
The building is in four storeys plus attics. It is constructed in red and yellow sandstone with a roof of brown tiles. The façade is asymmetrical, having a square stair turret, with three bays to the east and one wider bay to the west. At the street level five steps at the base of the tower lead down to the undercroft and in the middle east bay eight steps lead up to the Row level. Between these are shop fronts. At the Row level are cast iron railings behind which are stallboards and above them are moulded arches. On the front of the tower at this level is a blank scroll, on the east face is a recessed panel containing the initials W. B. (for William Brown), on the west face the initials are C. B. (for Charles Brown) and on the rear face is a scroll inscribed AD 1858: CRYPT CHAMBERS. On each side of the entrance to the shop are the Chester City arms. In each of the third and fourth storeys of the east bays are three pairs of arched, two-light windows with slender columns between each pair. In the west bay are four two-light arched windows in each storey. At this level on the tower is a two-storey oriel window. Above these storeys, the central eastern bay has a gable containing a traceried window in a rounded triangle, on each side of which are three-light dormer windows. The west bay also has a gable; this contains a small triangular oriel. The tower has a four-light window between shallow buttresses. The top of the tower consists of a truncated spire with a gabled dormer on each face. At its summit is a cast iron rail.

=== Interior ===
The undercroft consists of four bays with chamfered rib-vaulting; the masonry is "of high quality". The architectural historian Nikolaus Pevsner considered its undercroft to be "one of the best medieval crypts of Chester". Much of the structure above the undercroft has been changed or covered by modern materials.

== See also ==
- Grade I listed buildings in Cheshire West and Chester
