= Browns of Chester =

Department store in Chester, England

Coordinates: 53.19034°N 2.89080°W

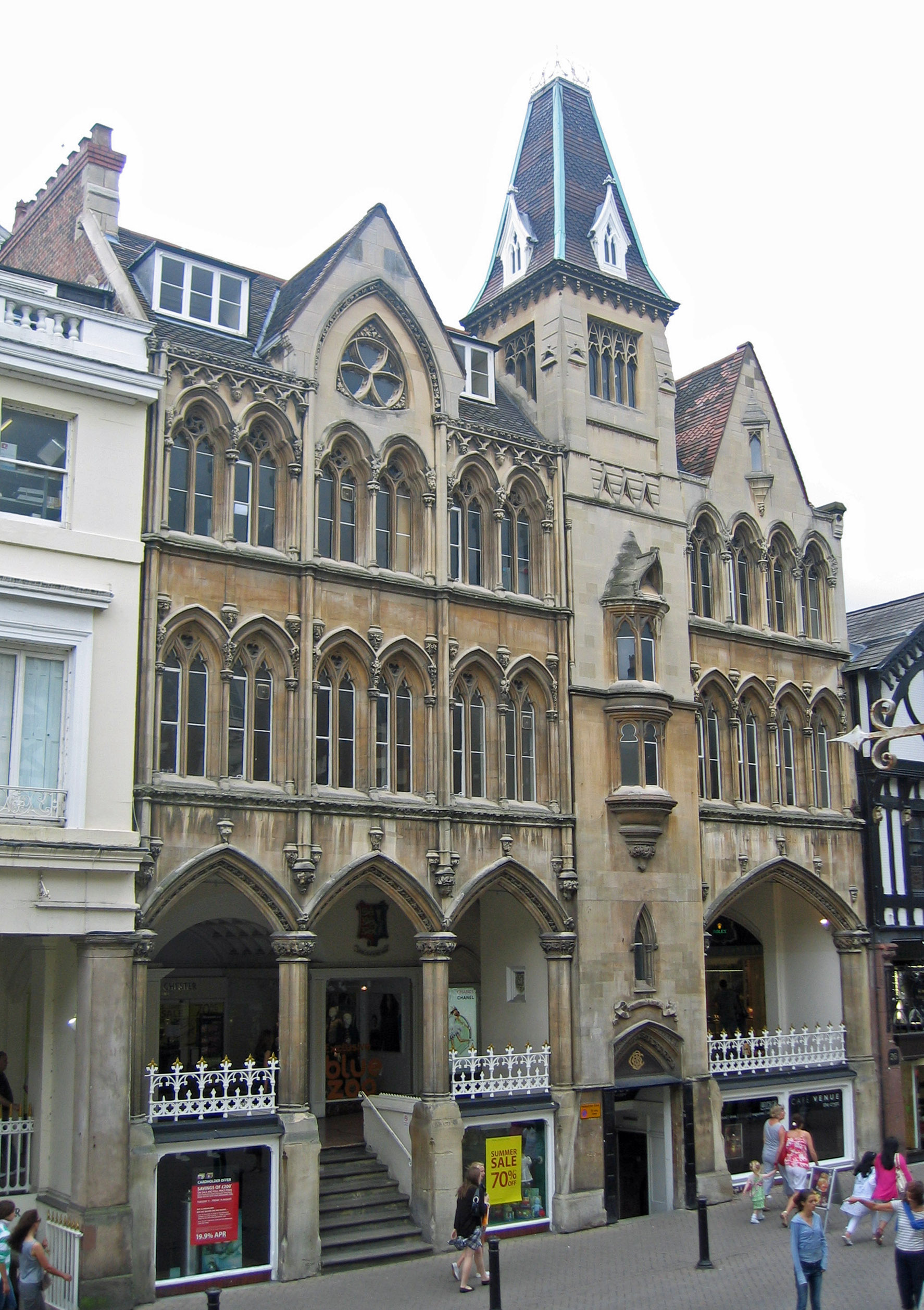
- Crypt Chambers houses part of the store and is a Grade I listed building.
- Company type: Unit
- Industry: Retailing
- Founded: 1780; 246 years ago
- Defunct: 12 May 2021
- Headquarters: Chester, England
- Key people: Susannah Brown (founder)
- Owner: Debenhams (1976-2021)

Browns was a department store in Chester established in 1780 by Susannah Brown. The store traded from its site on Chester's Eastgate Street from 1791 until 2021. Once regarded as the "Harrods of the North", the building interior contains many ornate features such as glass-domed roofs and elaborate plasterwork surrounding small chandeliers in the main entrance area. Some of the glass roof on the second floor has been concealed as it has been covered by the construction of the third-floor extension which contained the main café and Kalmora Spa.

The oldest part of the store is housed in the Grade I listed Crypt Chambers, designed by T. M. Penson incorporating Georgian, Tudor and Gothic facades. Construction was completed in 1858. The building incorporates part of the Chester Rows. On the front of the tower at Row level is a blank scroll, on the east face is a recessed panel containing the initials W. B. (for William Brown), on the west face the initials are C. B. (for Charles Brown) and on the rear face is a scroll inscribed AD 1858: Crypt Chambers. The Gothic facade frontage is built over a medieval undercroft dating from the twelfth century. The undercroft most recently contained 'The Tea Press' tea room.

Another extension to the building was completed in 1965 to link Browns to the nearby Grosvenor Shopping Centre. A new three-story extension was built in 2002 on the site formerly occupied by the offices of the Chester Chronicle.

It was acquired by Debenhams in 1976. Browns was the only store in the group to retain its own trading name alongside the standard 'Debenhams' branding. Debenhams entered liquidation in early 2021 and all remaining stores closed during May that year. The building was owned by British Land. It was bought by Martin Property Group in 2022, along with the neighbouring Grosvenor Shopping Centre.
