= Thomas Mainwaring Penson =

English surveyor and architect (1818-1864)

- Born: 1818; Oswestry, Shropshire, England
- Died: 1864 (aged 45–46)
- Occupation: Architect
- Father: Thomas Penson
- Relatives: Richard Kyrke Penson (brother)

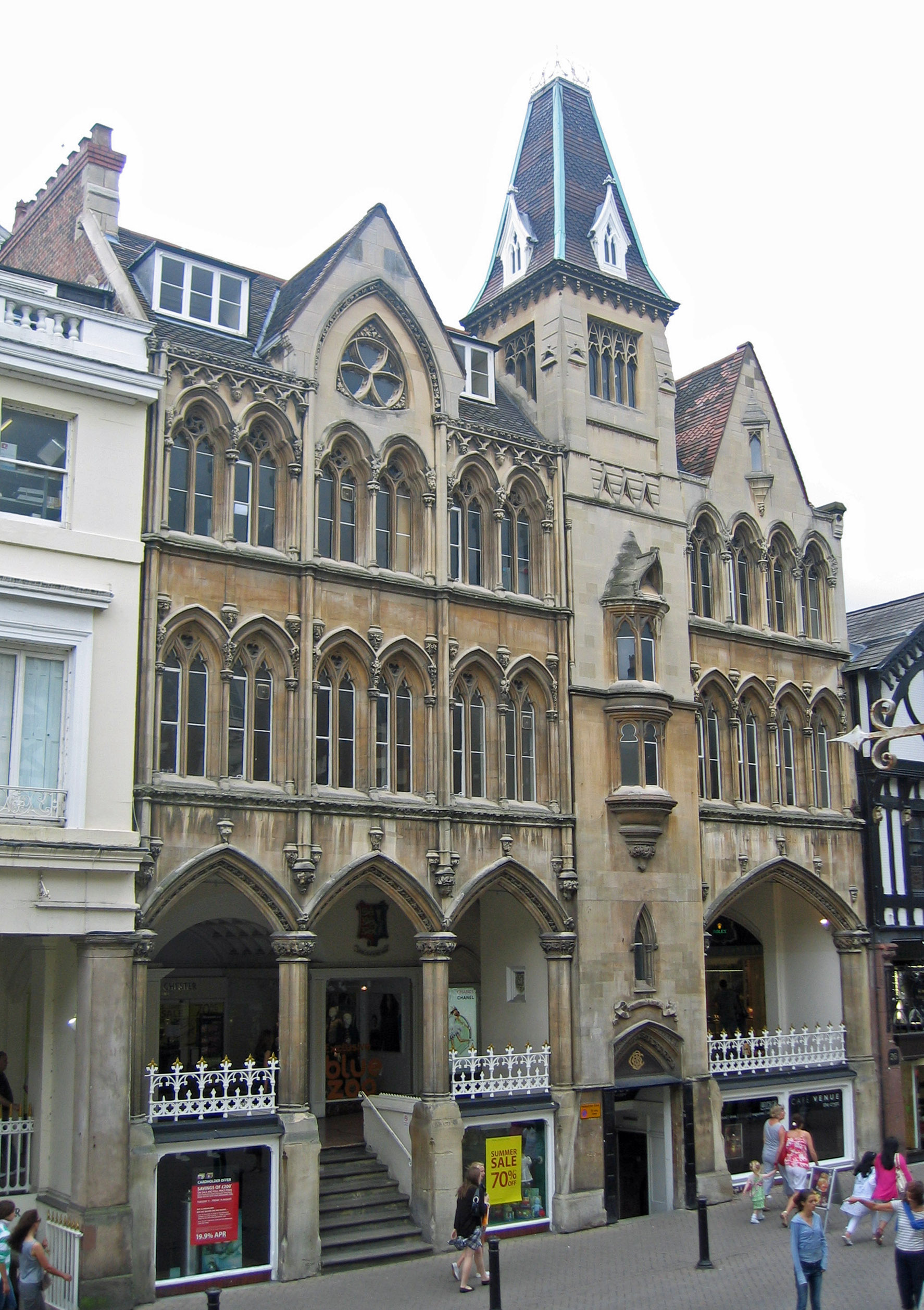
Crypt Chambers

Thomas Mainwaring Penson (1818–1864) was an English surveyor and architect. His father and grandfather, who were both named Thomas Penson, were also surveyors and architects. His grandfather Thomas Penson (c. 1760–1824) worked from an office in Wrexham, North Wales, and was responsible for the design of bridges, roads, gaols and buildings in North Wales. His son Thomas Penson (1790–1859) was county surveyor to a number of Welsh counties and also designed bridges. He later moved to Oswestry, Shropshire where he established an architectural practice. Thomas Mainwaring Penson was born in Oswestry, and was educated at Oswestry School. His elder brother was Richard Kyrke Penson who became a partner in the Oswestry practice in 1854, before developing an extensive architectural practice of his own, mainly in South Wales. Thomas Mainwaring Penson trained in his father's practice. Thomas Mainwaring initially designed buildings in the area of the practice, including stations for the Shrewsbury and Chester Railway.

He was then appointed as County Surveyor of Cheshire and moved to Chester, Cheshire. Here he laid out Overleigh Cemetery in 1848–50. This has been designated by English Heritage at Grade II in the National Register of Historic Parks and Gardens. He is credited with pioneering the Black-and-white Revival (vernacular or half-timbered) style in the city during the 1850s. His first building in this style was constructed in Eastgate Street in 1852, but it has since been demolished. His other notable buildings in Chester were designed both in Black-and-white Revival and in other styles. They include Crypt Chambers (1858) in Eastgate Street, which is in Gothic Revival style, Queen Hotel (1860–61) opposite Chester railway station, which is Italianate, and Grosvenor Hotel (1863–86) in Eastgate Street, which is constructed in a mixture of timber-framing, brick and stone. These three buildings have all been designated by English Heritage as listed buildings, Crypt Chambers at Grade I, and the other two at Grade II.

== See also ==
- List of works by Thomas Mainwaring Penson
