= Architecture of Wales =

Architecture of Wales is an overview of architecture in Wales, the United Kingdom, from the medieval period to the present day, excluding castles and fortifications, ecclesiastical architecture and industrial architecture. It covers the history of domestic, commercial, and administrative architecture.

There is little evidence for domestic architecture predating the 14th century in Wales. Earliest architecture includes tower houses and first floor halls as well as early stone buildings. There are still some timber frame constructions that still exist that date back to the 12th century, the earliest being at Chepstow Castle in Monmouthshire.

Mae Cymru yn drysorfa o adeiladu arbenig ....dim ond trwy astudio hanes pensaerniol rydym ni'n cael darllen clir osit oedd pobl yn byw o gyfnod i gyfnod
(Wales is a treasure trove of superb buildings ...only by studying Wales's architectural history do we get a clear picture of how people lived from one period to the next)

Quoted in Cyflwyno Cartrefi Cefn Gwlad/ Introducing Houses of the Welsh Countryside

— Suggett R & Stevenson G, Y Lolfa 2010

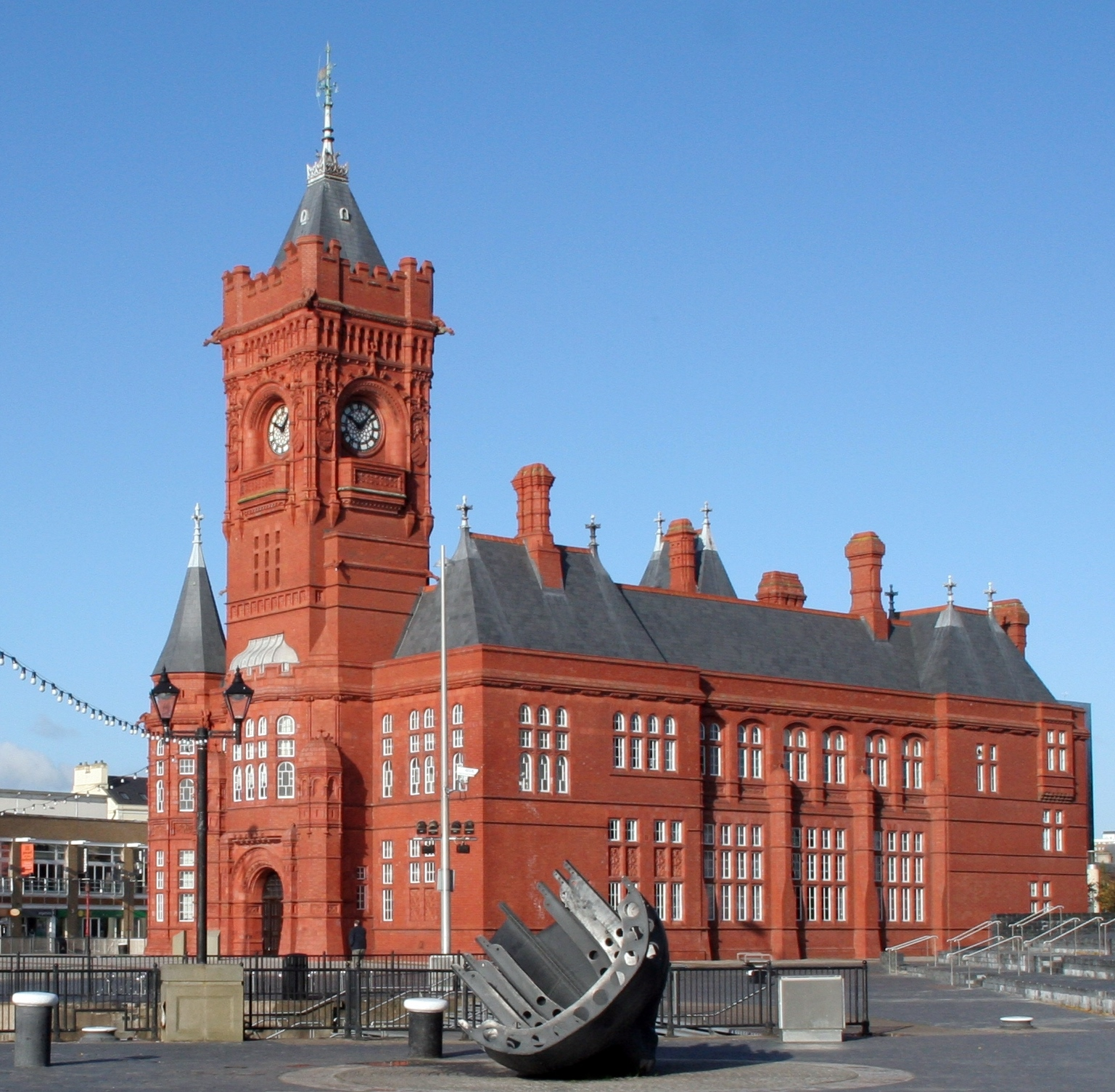
The Pierhead Building, Cardiff

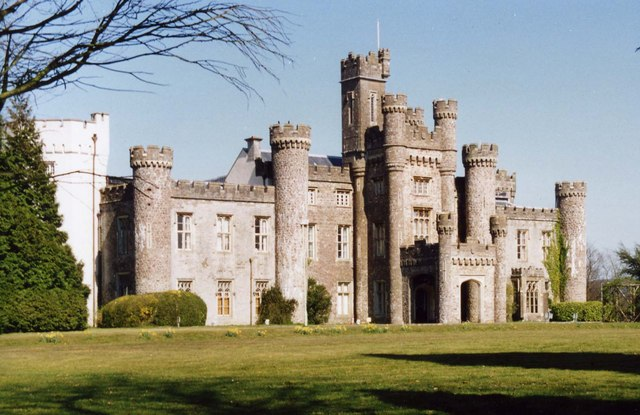
Hensol Castle

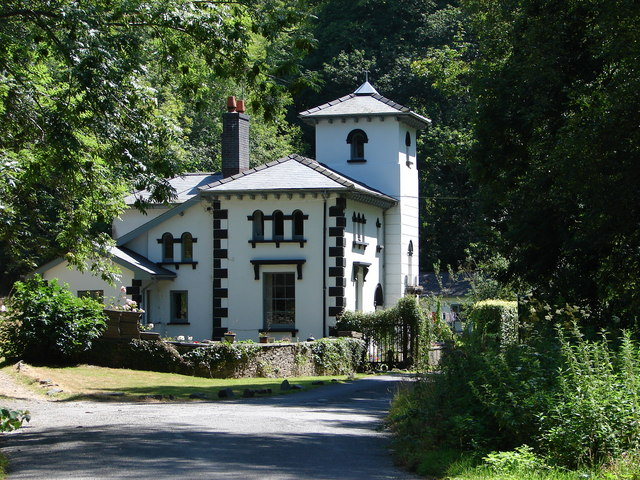
Nanteos Lodge by the architect R K Penson, 1857

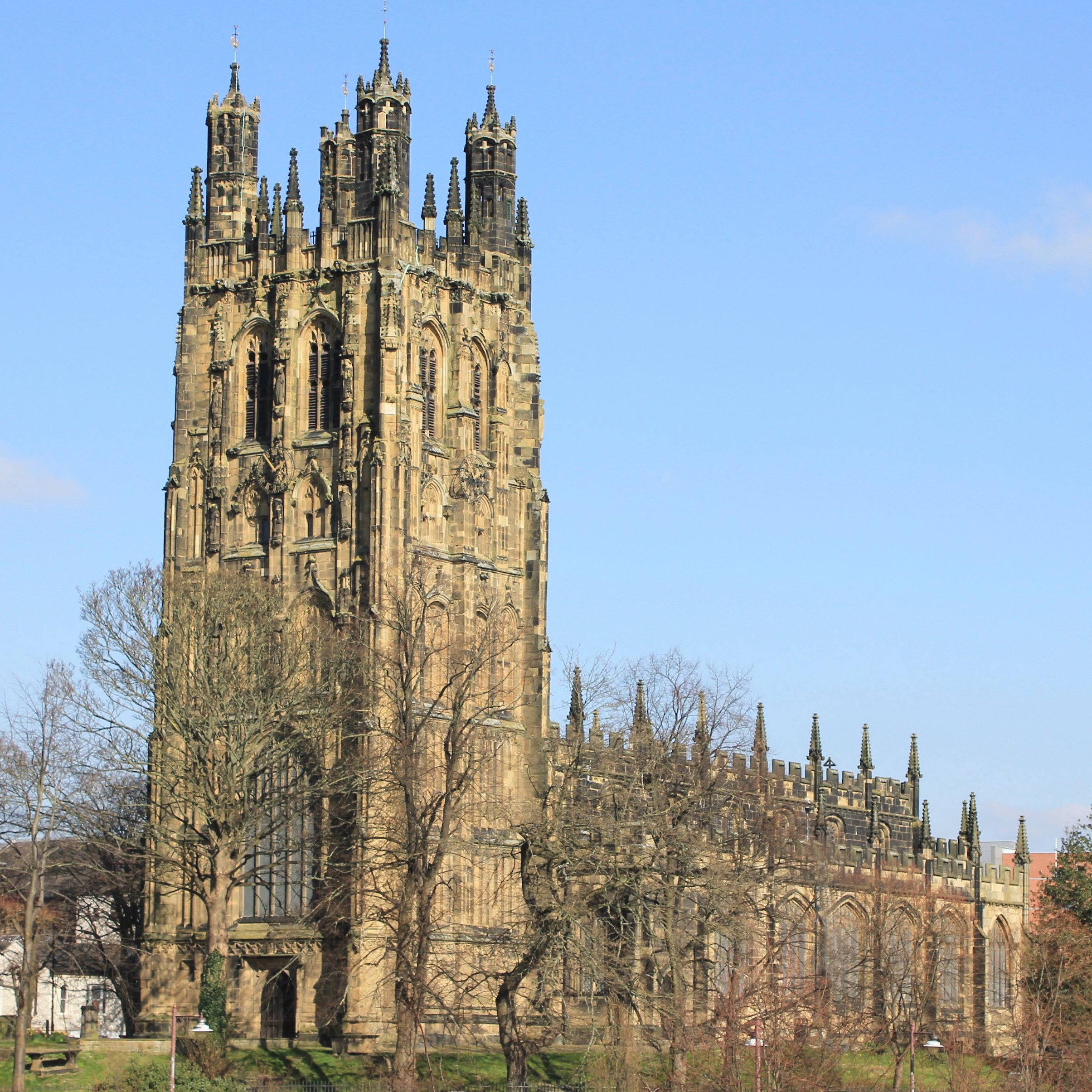
St Giles' Church, Wrexham

== Earliest architecture ==
There is little evidence of domestic architecture in Wales that predates the 14th century. The earliest domestic buildings are the stone tower houses, which may date back to about 1400, and various partially fortified first-floor hall houses such as Candleston Castle and Eastington at Rhoscrowther in Pembrokeshire. Most of the Welsh examples are in the southern coastal border area of Wales and particularly in Pembrokeshire. So far no Welsh timber-framed houses can be securely dated to before 1400, but the description by the poet Iolo Goch of Owain Glyndŵr's house at Sycharth shows that houses with timber cruck framing were being built well before this date. It has been suggested that the devastation caused following Owain Glyndŵr's revolt may have caused the destruction of many earlier timber-framed houses in the Welsh Marches.

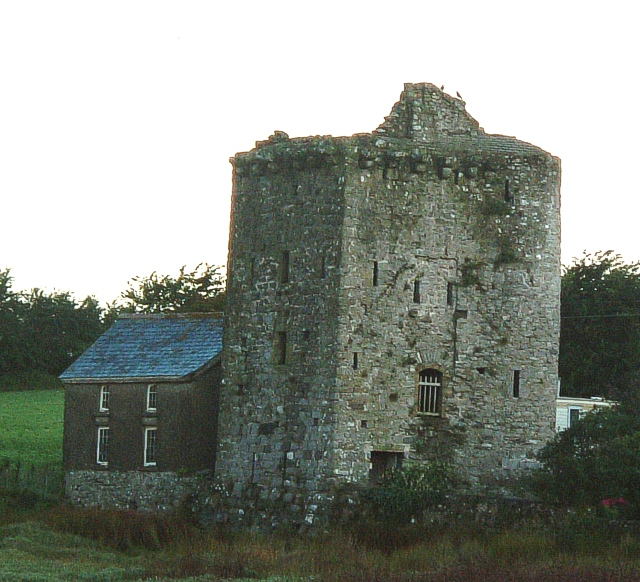
Peles Tower Angle

=== Tower houses and first floor halls ===
The distribution of tower houses in Wales has been discussed by both Hilling and Smith. Welsh tower houses, most of them built during the 14th and 15th centuries, were rectangular structures, consisting of two or more storeys, and are closely related to those in Ireland and Scotland. In 1976 Hilling produced a map (with listing) showing 17 examples. Further houses have been added by Suggett and it is possible that new examples will be recognised as being incorporated into existing buildings, as at Sandyhaven House in Pembrokeshire.

A further example is likely to be the prominent East Gate tower of Powis Castle. The East Gate appears to have been a tower house, which had an entrance made through the vaulted undercroft, probably in the 17th century. An extra storey was added to the tower in 1815–1818 when Sir Robert Smirke re-fenestrated the castle and added Gothic Revival battlements. Also on the Welsh border, close to Welshpool is Wattlesburgh. Many of the English tower houses, such as Tattershall Castle or Buckden Palace are slightly later and larger than the Welsh examples, and built of brick.

Apart from tower houses, there are a number of stone-built first floor hall buildings, where the hall is mounted over an undercroft. These include Owain Glyndŵr's Parliament House in Machynlleth. Most examples are found in southern Wales with a cluster of buildings in Pembrokeshire. The distribution of tower and other houses in Wales with vaulted ceilings have been mapped and listed by Peter Smith.

They also occur as early merchant's houses in Haverfordwest, Pembroke and Tenby. In some cases the hall is accessed by an outer stair, as is the case at Pentre Ifan Barn at Nevern in Pembrokeshire. Another example is Eastington at Rhoscrowther, Pembrokeshire, which has been called a tower house, but is more correctly a first floor hall house, with an outside stair and crenulations with a side tower. Eastington belonged to the Perrot family in the 15th century. There is a further complex of Medieval stone houses at East Orchard, St Athan, in Glamorgan which belonged to the de Berkerolles family in the 14th century. The group of buildings includes a first floor hall house with an outside chimney, which also had a separate kitchen block.

=== Early stone buildings and transition from castles ===
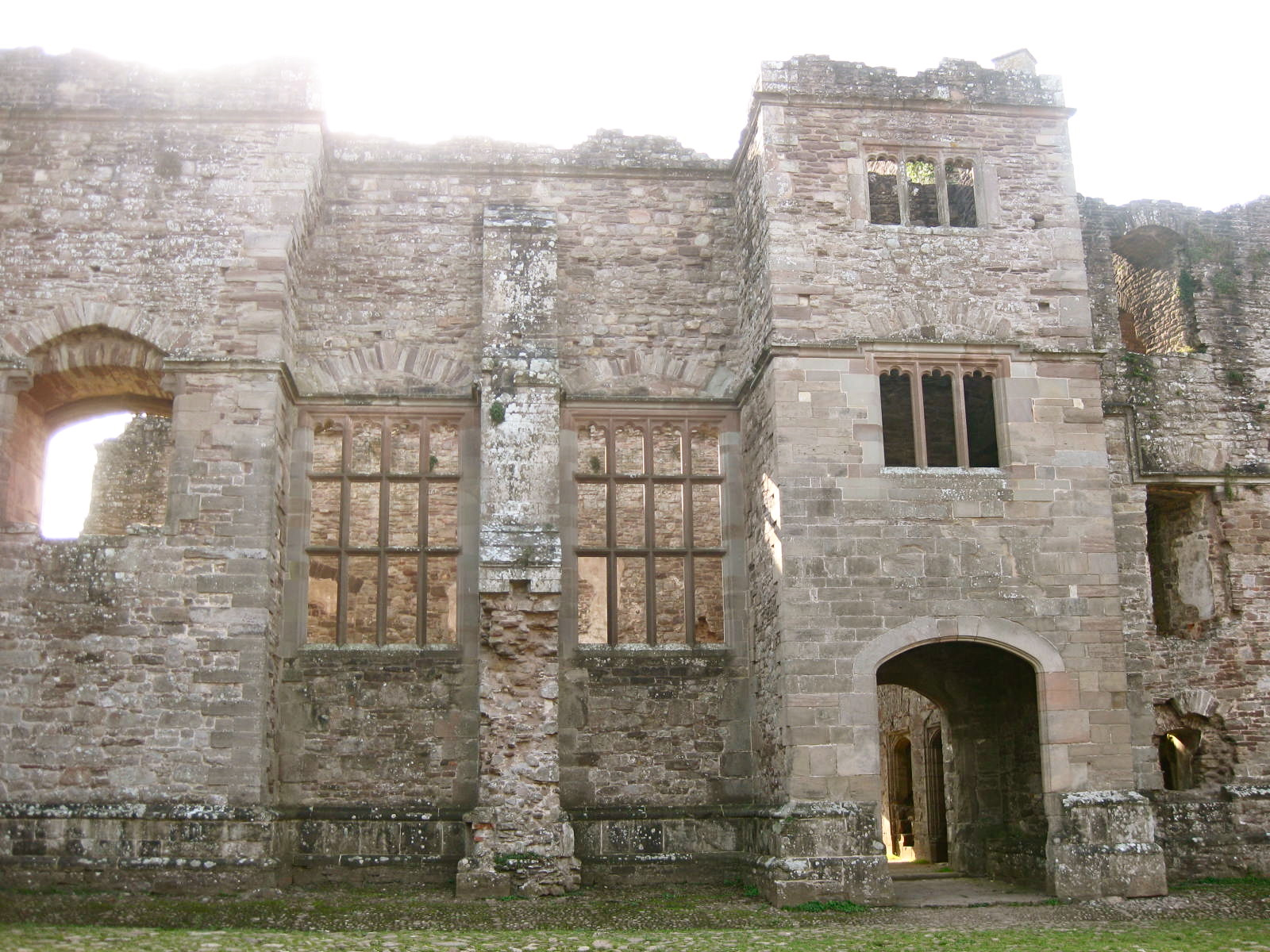
Raglan Castle, Monmouthshire

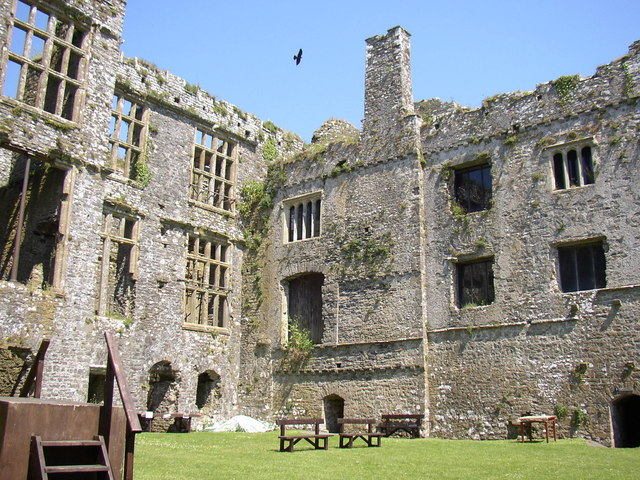
Internal view of Carew castle

From the later part of the 15th century, some of the Welsh castles underwent a transformation into grand houses. Some of these such as Chirk Castle and Powis Castle have remained as houses, but others such as Raglan Castle in Monmouthshire and Carew Castle in Pembrokeshire are ruins which can provide some idea of their grandeur. At Carew Sir Rhys ap Thomas from about 1480 onwards undertook a grand re-modelling including an almost entire re-fenestration with straight headed windows. This was continued after 1558 by Sir John Perrot, who replaced the north range with a splendid frontage with a long gallery at the second floor level in the fashion of Robert Smythson.

An even more impressive residence on a palatial scale was Raglan Castle. The earliest building is the freestanding hexagonal great tower, which is surrounded by a moat. It was probably built by Sir William ap Thomas before 1445. It would have served the function of a strongly defended tower house. This was followed in 1461–1469 by the enlargement of the castle by Sir William Herbert with a gatehouse to the NE and to the SW a range of sumptuously decorated state apartments. Further apartment ranges were built around the SW court. The two sets of apartments were approached by an impressive main staircase. From about 1549 to 1559 these buildings were extended, by William Somerset, 3rd Earl of Worcester, particularly around the "Pitched Stone" Court and also with the long gallery with its elaborately decorated Renaissance fireplaces. The slighting of the castle in the English Civil War and its subsequent partial demolition make it hard to appreciate Raglan as one of the major domestic buildings of Wales.

Another early house connected with the Herbert family was Tretower Court in Breconshire. It was here that William Herbert settled his stepbrother Roger Vaughan who built a house, which was to develop around a courtyard and continued being added to until the 17th century. Recently the arched braced truss roof of the great hall has been dated by Dendrochronology to c. 1455.

== Timber-framed construction ==
Timber-framed houses in Wales are concentrated particularly in the historic counties of Montgomeryshire and Denbighshire and mainly in areas which lack good building stone but have an abundance of ancient woodland that provided the timber for construction. The Welsh Poets often provide good descriptions of these early houses from the 14th century onwards, when praising their patrons. This is the case of Iolo Goch's description of Owain Glyndŵr's house at Sycharth in the late 14th century when the poet mentioned that the house was constructed with crucks and had a slate roof.

=== Dendrochronology and the dating of Welsh houses ===
Since the 1990s the availability of dates provided by tree-ring dating or dendrochronology has revolutionised the study of early buildings in Wales and is particularly relevant for timber-framed buildings. The earliest tree ring date associated with a building in Wales is a date commissioned by Cadw for a door at Chepstow Castle which was made from wood felled between 1159 and 1189.

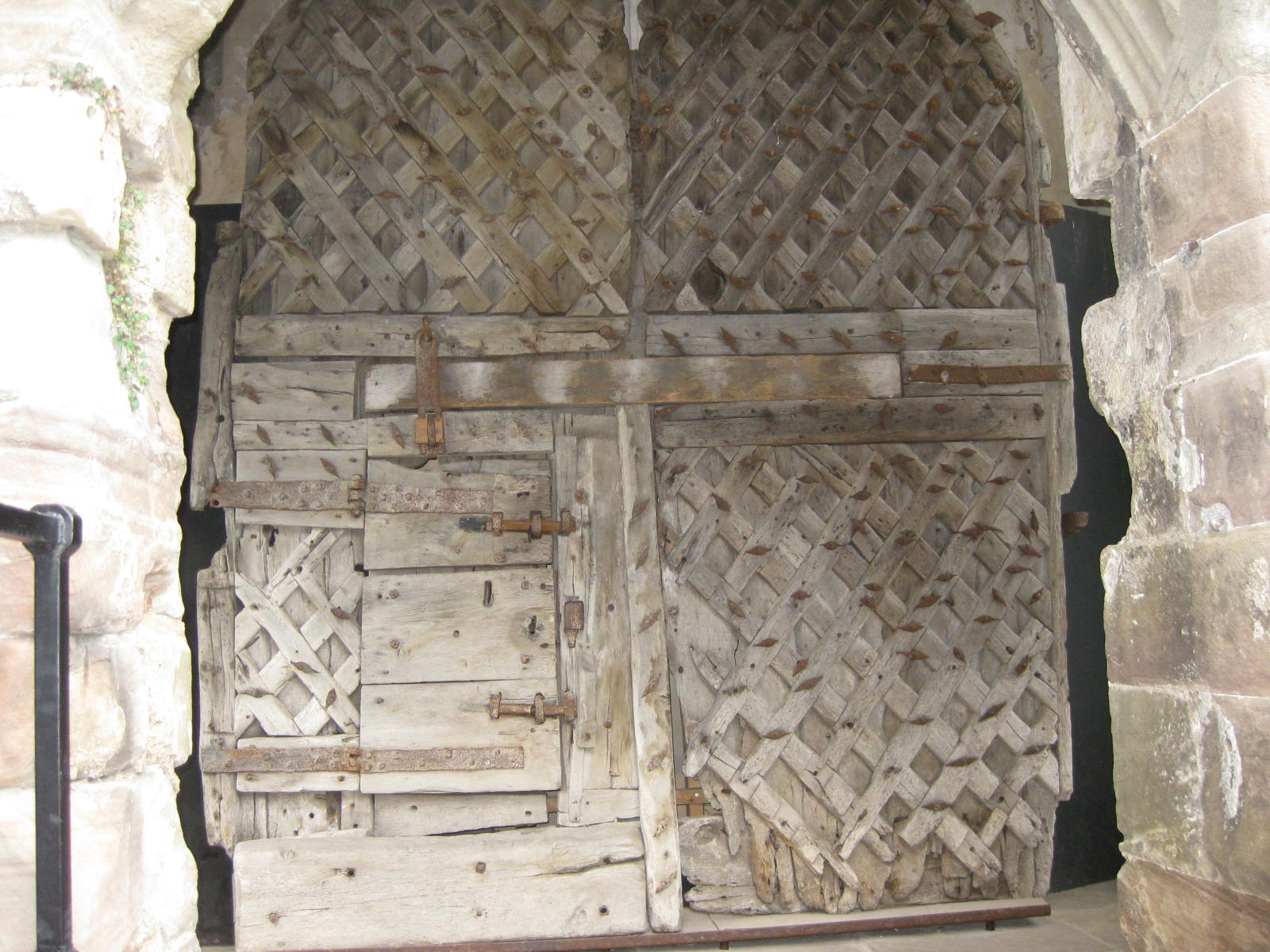
Chepstow Castle, Monmouthshire, the door dated to 1159-1189AD

A complete listing of tree ring dates for Wales is maintained by the Vernacular Architecture Group at the Archaeological Dataservice and slightly over 200 samples have been taken, though not all have provided positive results. The scheme has largely been sponsored by the Royal Commission on the Ancient and Historical Monuments of Wales in conjunction with the Dating Welsh Houses Group (DOWG). The greatest number of dates are available from Merionethshire, Montgomeryshire and Denbighshire, areas which have some of the greatest concentrations of timber-framed houses. Other early dates are c. 1250 for timbers from the Chapter House at Brecon Cathedral and 1386 for the bell frame in Tower of St David's Cathedral. The earliest domestic building to be dated by dendrochronology is Hafodygarreg at Erwood, in Breconshire of 1402. Many dates have been obtained for buildings after this, possibly suggesting that there was a great re-building in Wales after the devastation caused by Owain Glyndŵr's uprising. The evidence of dendrochronology clearly shows that in the 15th and the first half of the 16th centuries, hall houses were the standard plan for domestic buildings. The great majority of timber-framed houses were built with cruck trusses, while a few higher-status houses were constructed with aisled trusses. Change came in the mid-16th century when houses became two or more storeyed. Regional forms of houses evolved and some are now stone-built. The earliest stone-built "Snowdonia House", with an upper storey, is Tyn Llan at Gwyddelwern, which has been shown by dendrochronology to date from 1519 to 1537.

== Aisled hall houses ==
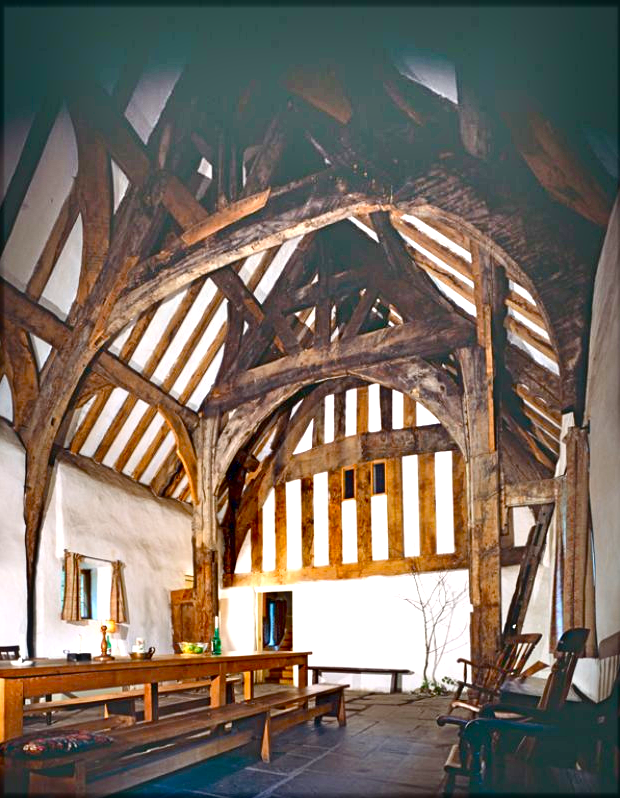
Plas Uchaf, Llangar, Corwen. Aisled hall

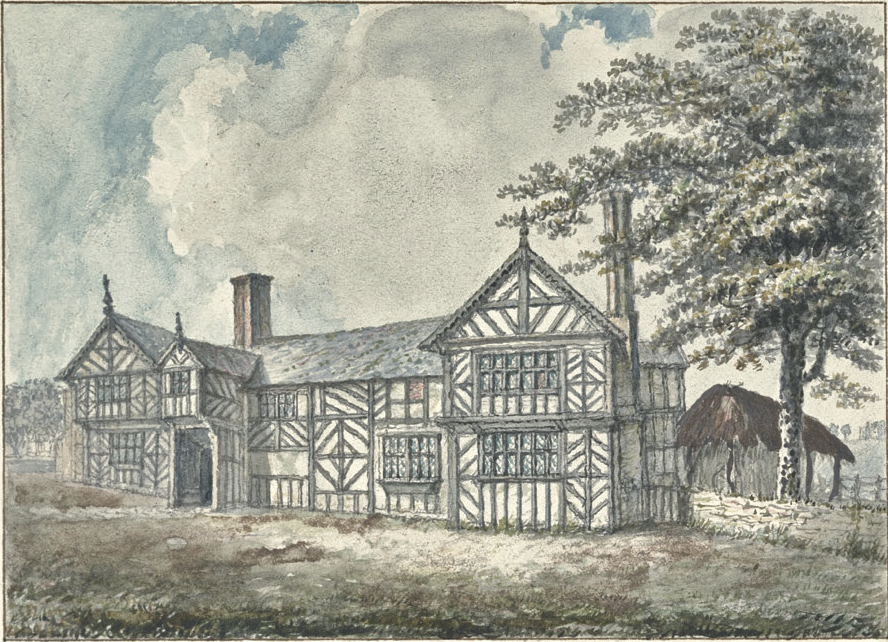
Althrey Hall, Bangor on Dee. Watercolour by John Ingleby 1794

Aisled-framed hall houses have one or more rows of interior posts. These interior posts typically carry more structural load than the posts in the exterior walls. Aisled Hall houses are early in the sequence of timber-framed houses and were high status dwellings. In his study of these houses Peter Smith recorded 20 examples of this construction, mainly in NE Wales and particularly in Denbighshire. In some cases such as Plas Uchaf at Llangar near Corwen, which has now been restored by the Landmark Trust, the roof was supported by both aisle and cruck trusses. Plas Cadogan at Esclusham near Wrexham survived as the finest example of a Welsh aisled house with an open hall up to roof. Despite being a Grade I listed building it was demolished in 1967.

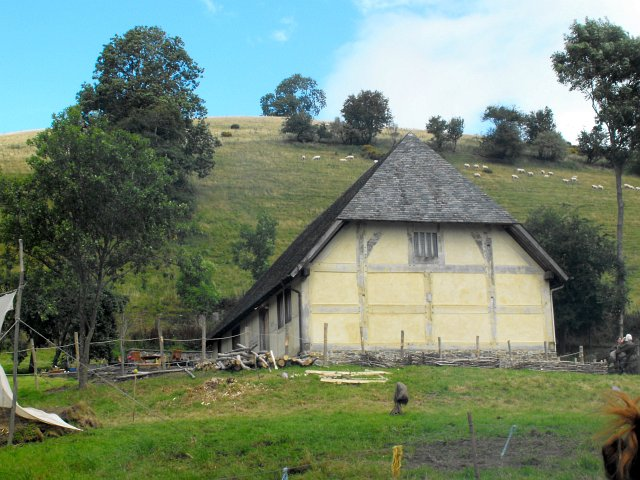
Tŷ Mawr, Castle Caereinion

Aisled hall houses in Wales have been dated by dendrochronology to the 15th century, though examples in England are often earlier. Some of the aisled houses such as the Upper House at Painscastle in Radnorshire or Althrey Hall in Maelor Saesneg had box-framed wings added to provide far greater accommodation and formed an H-shaped plan for the building. Althrey Hall was built in the early C16 and was described by John Leland as "a fair house" in the 1530s. It is thought that it was built for Richard ap Howel. The double portrait wallpainting surviving in the first floor of mid-16th-century date is likely to represent Richard's son, Elis ap Richard (died 1558), with his bride Jane Hanmer. An example of an aisled hall house that has been studied in great detail and fully restored is Ty Mawr, Castle Caereinion in Montgomeryshire. This house has been dated to 1460 by dendrochronology and was owned by the Alo ap Rhiwallon family (who had settled there in the 13th century), and the builder of Tŷ Mawr was probably Dafydd ap Gwilym, the great-great-grandson of Alo ap Rhiwallon.

== Cruck construction ==
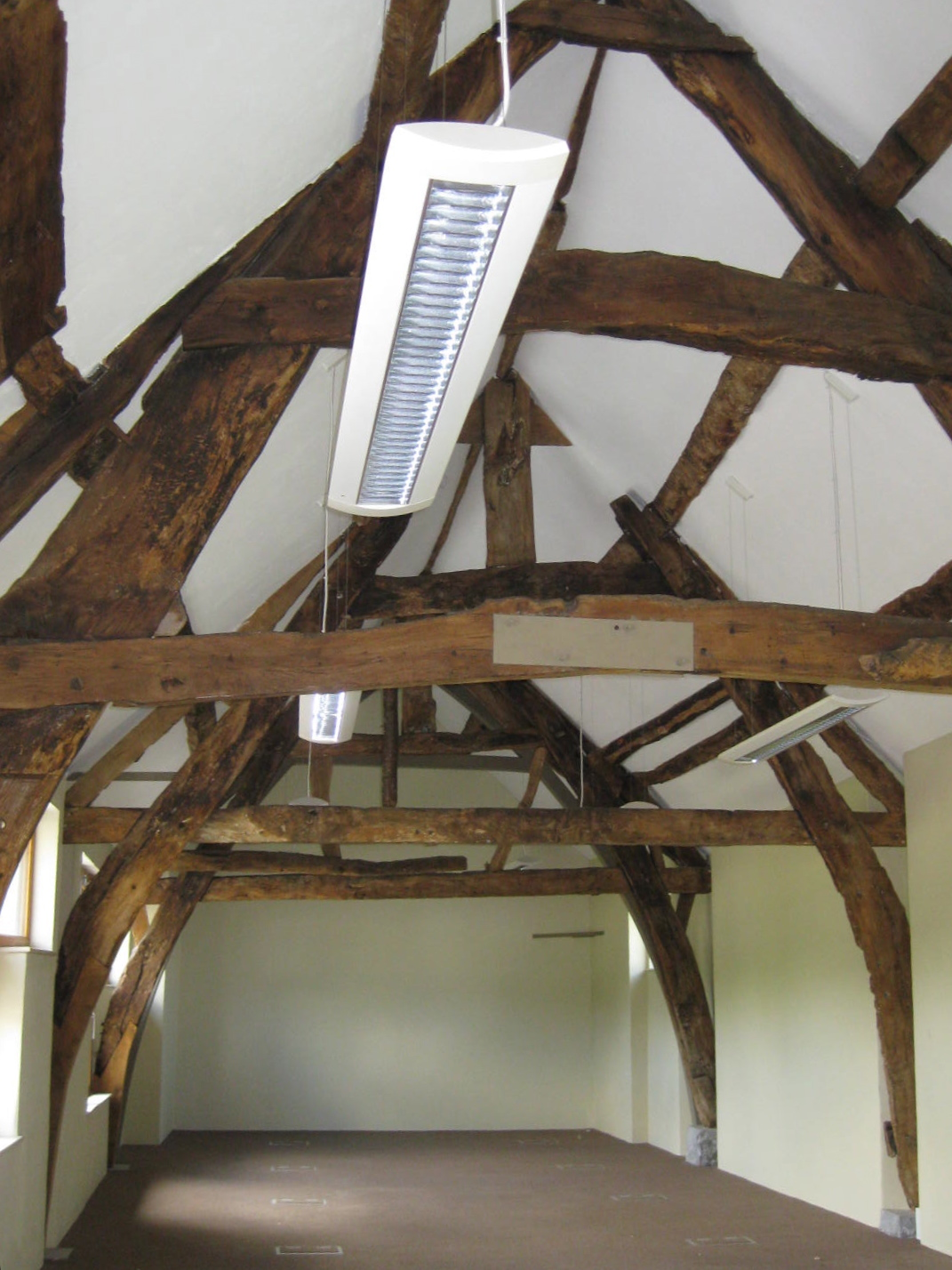
Cruck Barn at Ty-coch Llangynhafal, Denbighshire. Dated to 1430.

The Vernacular Architecture Group currently has records of 1002 historic cruck framed buildings in Wales Of these 520 are in Powys and by far the greatest concentration are in the historic county of Radnorshire with 318 examples and Montgomeryshire with 161. The praise poetry of Iolo Goch describing Owain Glyndŵr's houses at Sycharth indicate that cruck construction was well established in 14th-century Wales. The earliest cruck framed house to be dated so far is Hafodygarreg at Erwood in Breconshire, which has a date of 1402. These cruck buildings are part of the Hall-house tradition with central fireplaces and the smoke escaping through vents in the roof. Some of the cruck framed houses were extended by adding wings, providing an H-shaped layout. With the introduction of box framed and jettied houses in the mid-15th century, the use of crucks gradually went out of fashion. At this time many cruck houses were converted into barns and evidence for fireplaces and chimney stacks stripped. A good example of a house that has been converted into a barn, possibly as late as the 18th century is at Ty-coch Llangynhafal, Denbighshire. This has recently been restored by Denbighshire County Council and it has been dated to 1430. There are many instances in Montgomeryshire where more elaborate timber framed farmhouses are associated on the same site with earlier houses that were converted into barns. At Rhyd y Carw in Trefeglwys the original cruck framed hall house dated to about 1525 while nearby stands the impressively decorated box-framed Rhydycarw farmhouse dating from the earlier part of the 17th century.

== Regional types of sub-medieval houses ==
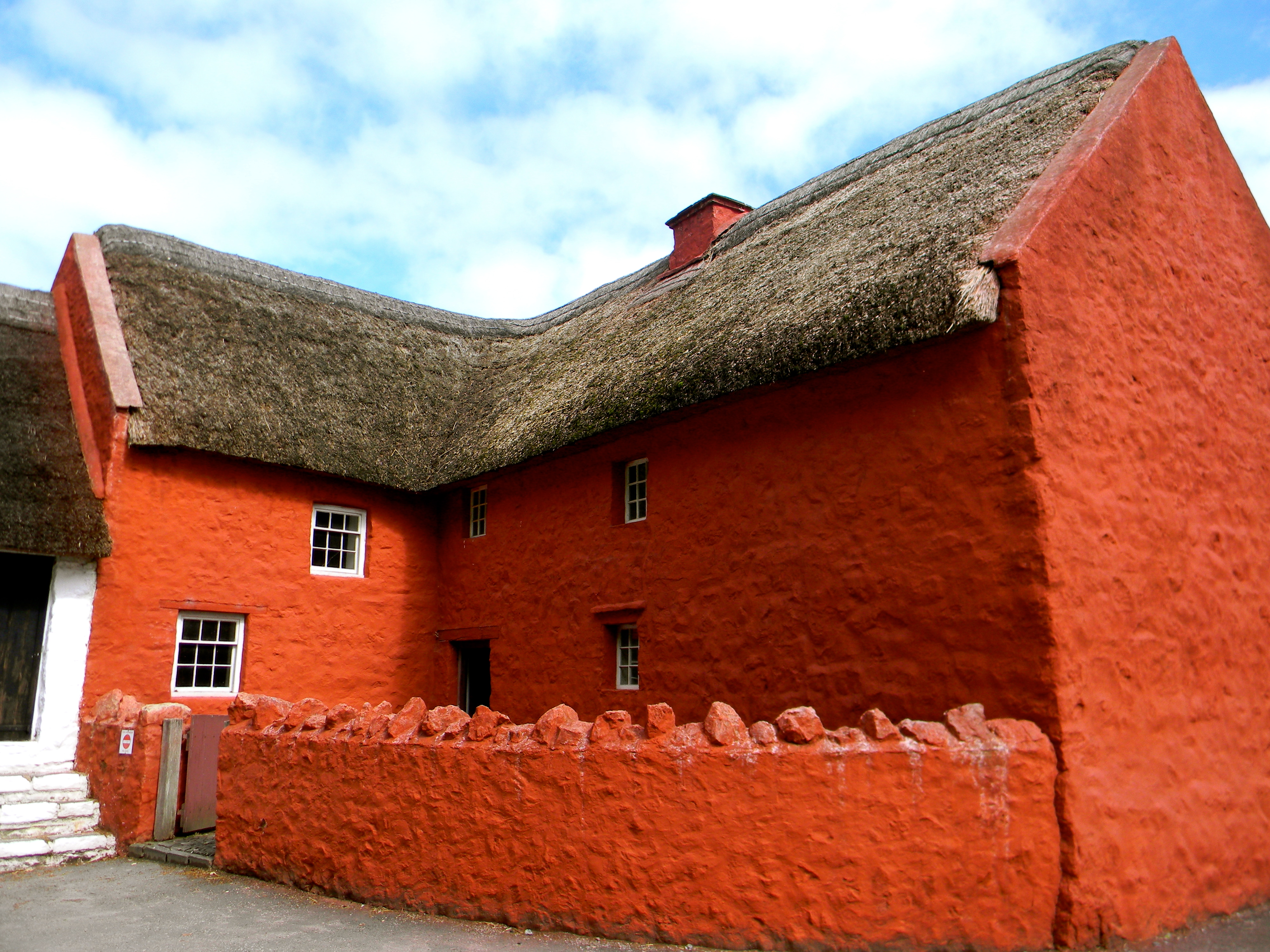
Kennixton Farmhouse, reconstructed at St Fagans

The idea of the Sub-Medieval House in Wales was first developed by Cyril Fox and Lord Raglan in their study of the Vernacular architecture of Monmouthshire, Monmouthshire Houses, which was published between 1951 and 1954. Fox and Raglan recognised that around 1550 a great change occurred in Welsh house building. While the earlier medieval traditions of constructing with crucks and timber framing continued, many new features start to appear in domestic architecture. Chimneys start to be inserted into the halls of houses instead of the open fireplaces and chimney stacks may either be built on the gable ends of houses or as lateral chimneys on the side walls. At the same time timber framed and stone houses started to be built with one and even more storeys. Box framing starts to supplant the older timber framing with crucks and in order to gain more floor space at the upper levels these floors were jettied out from the building line. Fox and Raglan considered that in Monmouthshire, the building of "Sub-Medieval" houses continued until around 1620.

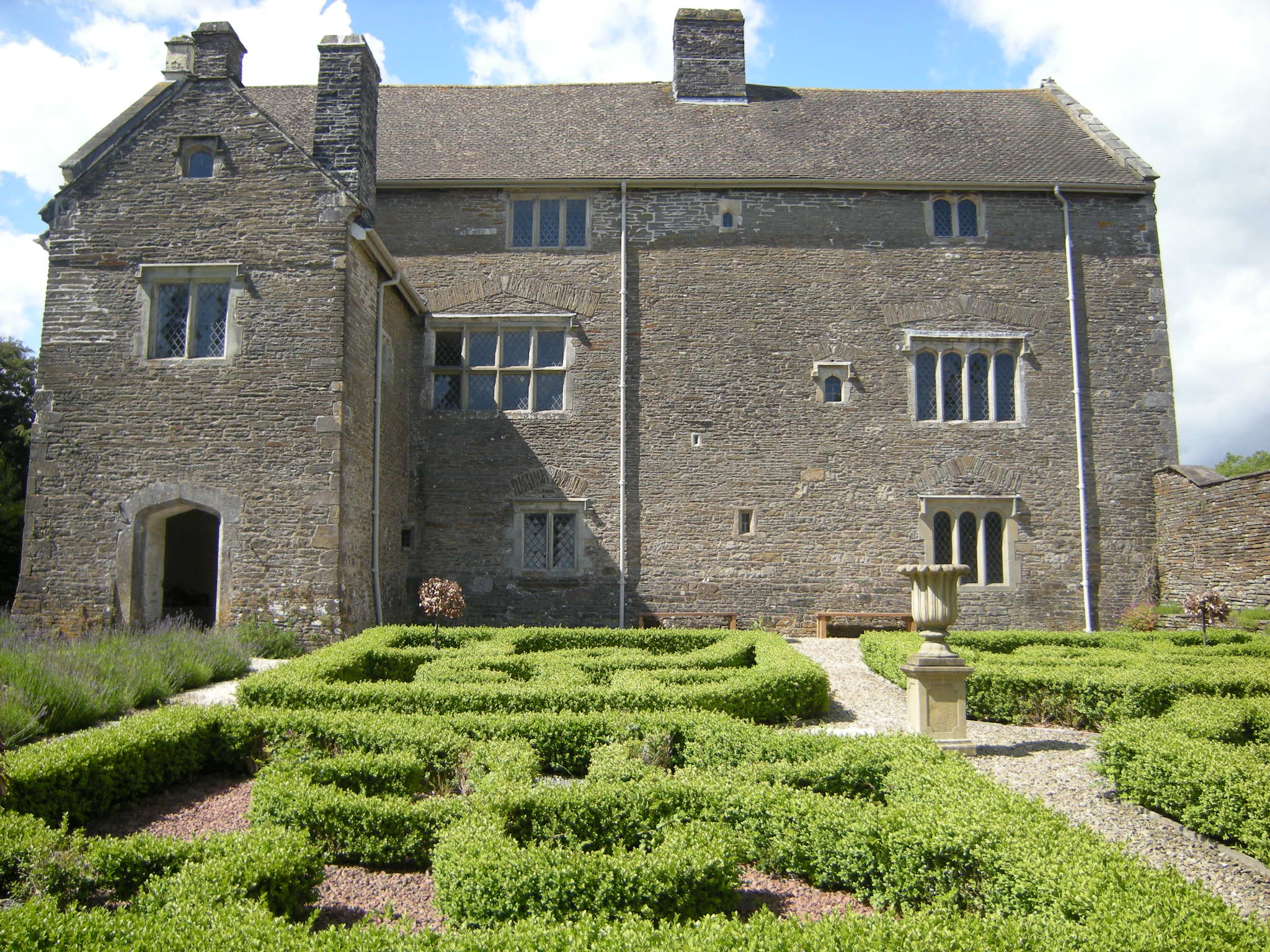
Llancaiach Fawr

An excellent example of a Sub Medieval house is Llancaeach-Fawr at Gelligaer in Glamorgan. John Newman comments that in contrast with other buildings of the period "it is a delight to find one so nearly perfectly preserved". It is of three storeys and largely of a single build period. It was built by either Richard ap Lewis or his son David ap Richard (Prichard), who was resident here in the 1530s. The windows emphasise the importance of the first floor rooms.

The ideas of Fox and Raglan were developed by Peter Smith in his study of Houses of the Welsh Countryside, first published in 1975 and re-issued as an enlarged addition in 1988. Smith classifies five main types of "Sub-Medieval" houses based on the position of the chimney or chimneys and the position of the main entrance door. These groups are:

- Type A, Houses with Lateral Chimneys heating the hall of the house or end gable houses. These occur in northern and southern areas of Wales but rarely in the central areas. The end gable houses include the Snowdonia Houses of north Wales
- Type B. Houses with the chimney backing on the entry. The chimneys are placed centrally in the house and the entrance may lead into a screen passage at the back of the fireplace.
- Type C. The Lobby Entrance House where the fireplace is centrally placed and the entrance is by a door into a small lobby area placed against the chimney stack. Those houses are timber framed and occur mainly in Montgomeryshire, Radnorshire and Denbighshire. The Severn Valley houses of Montgomeryshire are within this grouping.
- Type D. Similar to the Lobby Entry Houses but lack the double-backed fireplaces and have an additional end gable. There are a few houses of this type in N.E. Wales, but otherwise, they occur as stone-built houses in Glamorgan.
- Type H. This is a gable entry house, similar to type B, but the entry is away from the gable fireplace. This type only occurs in Glamorgan and Monmouthshire.

=== Long houses and the long house controversy ===
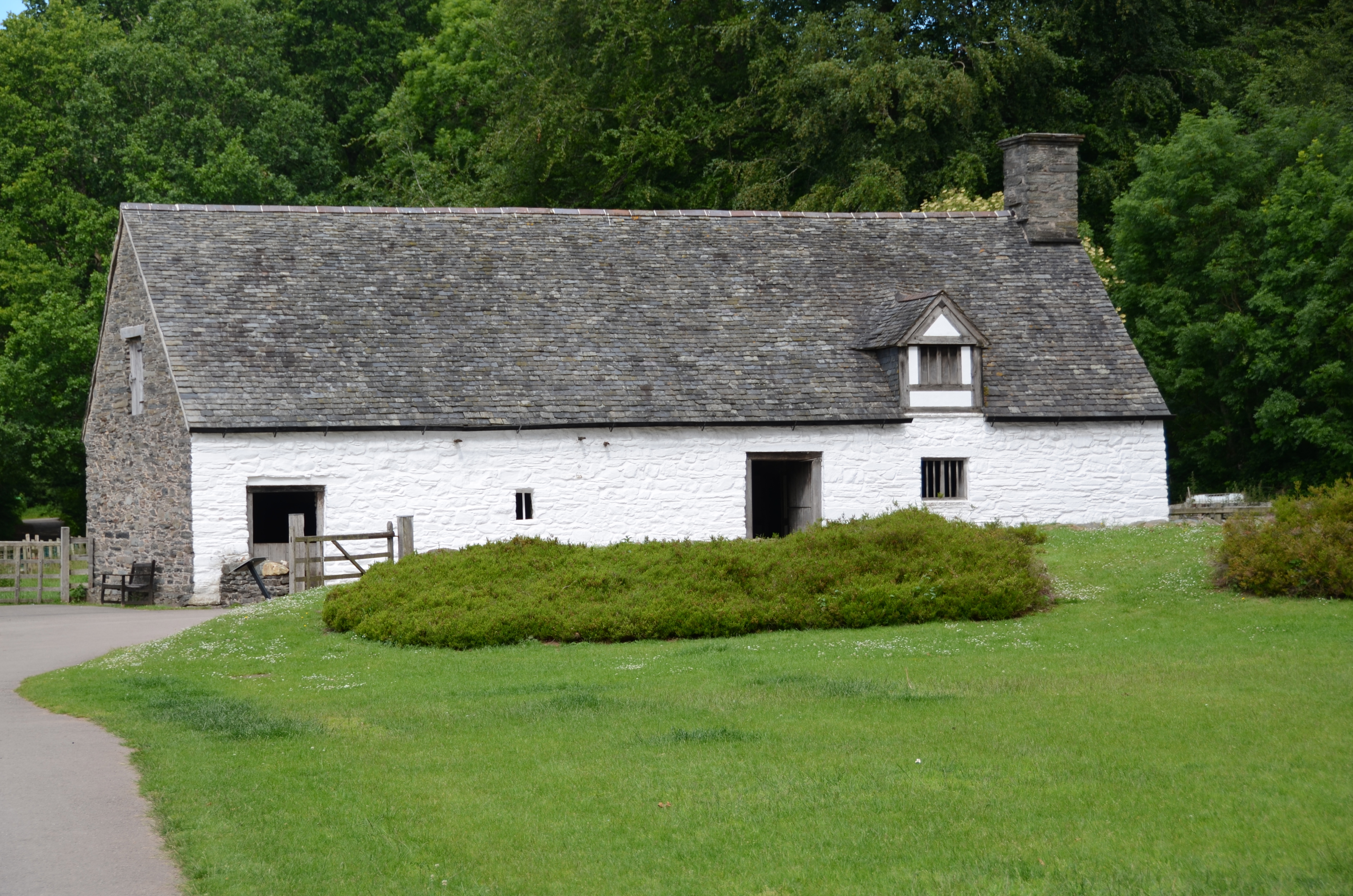
Cilewent farmhouse, St Fagans

A good example of a long house is Cilewent Farmhouse from Llansanffraid Cwmteuddwr, near Rhayader, Radnorshire which has been reconstructed at St Fagans. This is a long-house, with cattle being accommodated at one end and humans at the other, with a passageway between the two parts. This type of farmhouse was once common in mid- and south Wales. This cruck and timber-framed house was originally built about 1470 as an open hall house. The original timber walls were rebuilt in stone in 1734, with the date being carved on the head of the entrance door frame. All that remains of the original house are the two cruck trusses in the cow house and the timber-framed partition between the cow house and the dwelling. Another reconstruction at St Fagans is Hendre'r-ywydd Uchaf Farmhouse from Llangynhafal in Denbighshire. This a cruck-framed hall-house dendrochronologically dated to 1508 and typical of the better class of Welsh farmhouse in the late Middle Ages. The building is divided into five bays, the lower two used for housing for cattle and horses, the centre bay serving as a work-room and the upper two comprising the open hall and a bedroom. The outside walls are timber-framed, the panels being in-filled with wattle and daubed with clay. Both the daubed panels and the timberwork are limewashed as was common in the Middle Ages. The open hearth is placed in the centre of the hall, smoke from the fire escaping through the roof and the unglazed windows. Excavations in 2003 by Bill Britnell at Tŷ Draw at Llanarmon Mynydd Mawr in north Powys have done much to elucidate the relationship of the cow house with the hall of a longhouse. This is a classic three-unit hall house of longhouse type. It has an open hall of two bays set between inner and outer rooms, the outer room acting as a cow byre. Dendrochrononology on the roof purlins suggest that Tŷ Draw was completed shortly after 1479–80 and it has been possible to suggest from this dating that the house was built by Hywel ap Rees. In the byre area, which was accessed by door, a series of small post holes were noted, that have been interpreted as wickerwork hurdles. These would have provided stalls for cattle which were overwintered from November to March each year. Similar evidence for stalls for cattle has been found at Tŷ Mawr and Tyddyn Llwydion in Montgomeryshire.

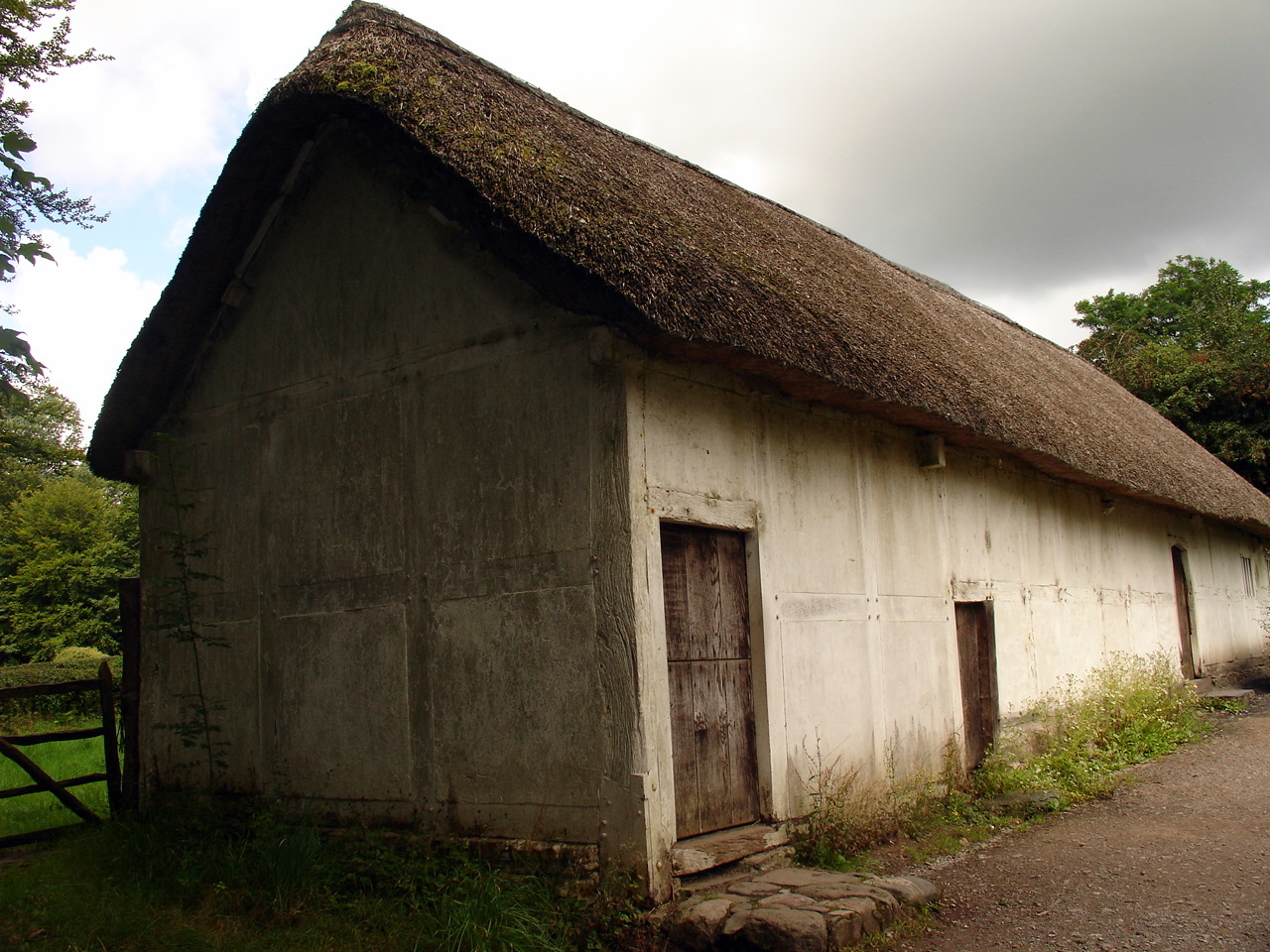
Hendre'r Ywydd Uchaf farmhouse, St Fagans

The idea of the "Longhouse" or "Tŷ-hir" was first discussed by Iorwerth Peate in his pioneering book The Welsh House (1940). This was the description of a house where both people and beasts were housed together under the same roof, as portrayed in the Medieval Welsh poem Dream of Rhonabwy. Peate thought that the Welsh Longhouse had had a long history and that it occurred in all parts of Wales. This view was challenged by Peter Smith, who had gathered a vast amount of information in his Houses of the Welsh Countryside, published in 1975. This showed that longhouses were rarely "one-phase" buildings and often the byre had been added onto the house. This showed that longhouses were not an upland phenomenon and are noticeably absent from Gwynedd where "Snowdonia Houses" are detached from their farm buildings. The longhouses occur particularly in Ceredigion, Radnorshire and North Powys. Suggett uses the example of Nannerth-ganol near Rhayader to illustrate the close connection of the family who lived in this house with cattle rustling, which was particularly prevalent in mid-Wales in the Elizabethan period.

=== Box framing ===
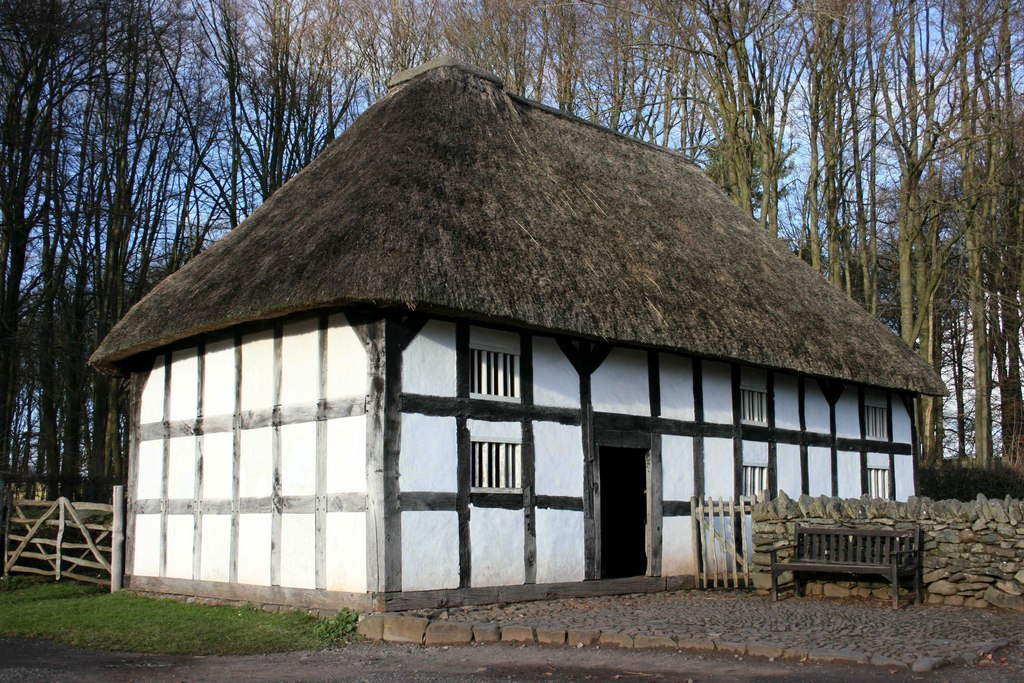
Abernodwydd Montgomeryshire, Farmhouse reconstructed at St Fagans

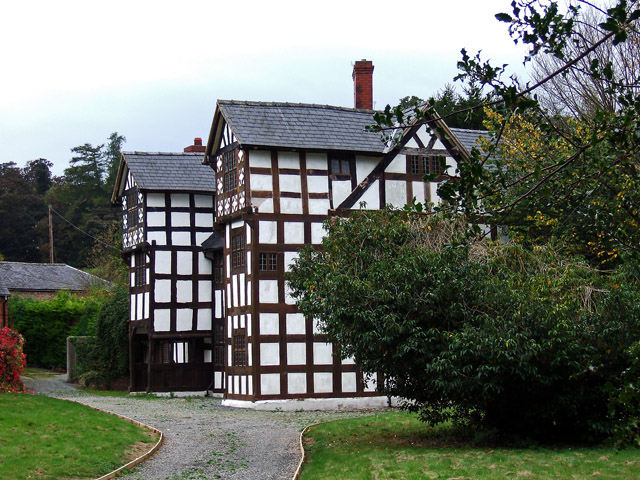
Plas yn Pentre near Trevor, Wrexham

A good example of box framing is of this is Plas yn Pentre at Trevor near Wrexham. On the dissolution of the abbey in 1536 it came into the possession of the High Sheriff of Denbighshire, Ieuan Edwards. His grandson partially re-built the house in 1634. His initials and the date can be seen carved into the exterior of the west gable.

The largest and most impressive of these houses was Lymore, Montgomery, built by Edward, third Lord Herbert of Chirbury, c. 1675 (date on a gable finial but not finished until 1677, a year before Lord Herbert's death) The house had a close-studded frontage, with an open three-bay Renaissance loggia on the ground floor, six gables (later reduced to three), and, rising from the centre, a pyramid-roofed look-out tower or Belvedere. While the main house was built in timber, there was extensive use of brick for the inner courtyard and service wings. The hall was not used as the family seat for long, and for most of its existence it was either unoccupied or used by agents of the estate. It was, however, kept in good order and in 1909 the Prince of Wales, who was shooting in the surrounding parkland, was entertained here. In August 1921 the floor collapsed during a Bazaar Sale, and the hall was finally demolished in 1931.

=== Pembrokeshire houses with round chimney stacks ===
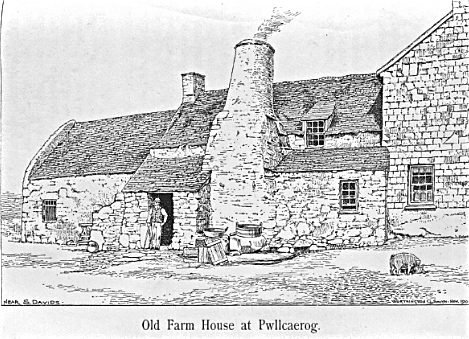
Old Farmhouse at Pwllcaerog, Pembrokeshire

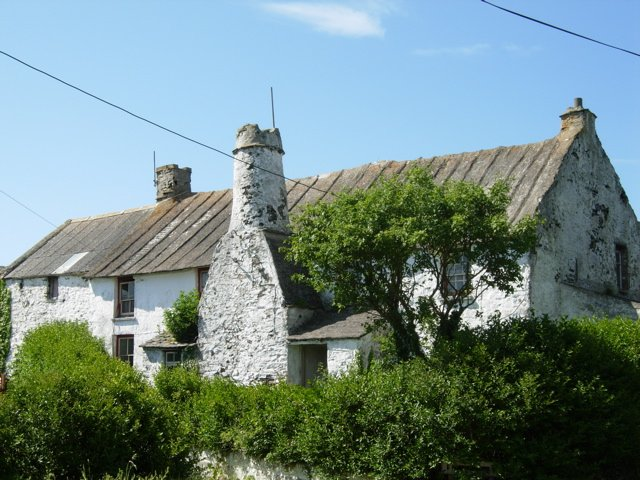
Rhosson Uchaf Farm, on the lane to St Justinian's, West of St David's

These form an unusual group of Sub-Medieval Houses which were studied by E.L Barnwell in 1867–1868 and by J Romilly Allen in 1902. Characteristically these are a form of Hall house with a lateral chimney stack, which may be either round or conical. Typically these chimneys have a lean-to outshoot on either side of the stack, with one of these outshoots acting as a porch. Cottages and houses with these chimneys were mapped by Peter Smith and he showed that they form two groups, one around St Davids and the other to the south of Pembroke. There is a good example of one of these chimneys on the Merchants House, Tenby. Houses with very similar plans and lateral outshoots, but with square chimneys, also cluster on the Gower Peninsula

=== Lobby entrance and Severn Valley houses ===
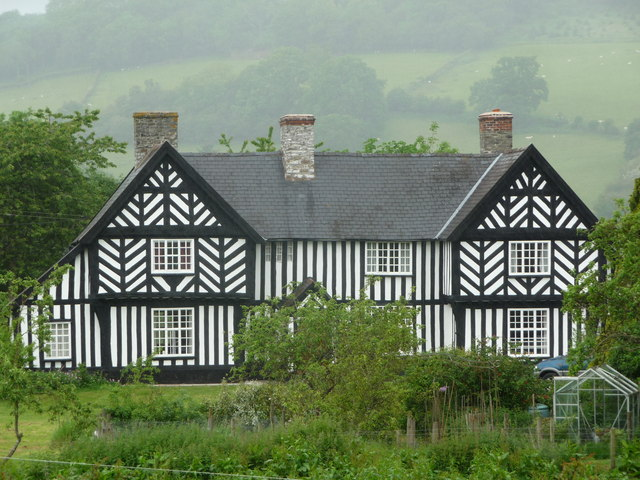
Penarth, a black and white house near Newtown (geograph 2980737)

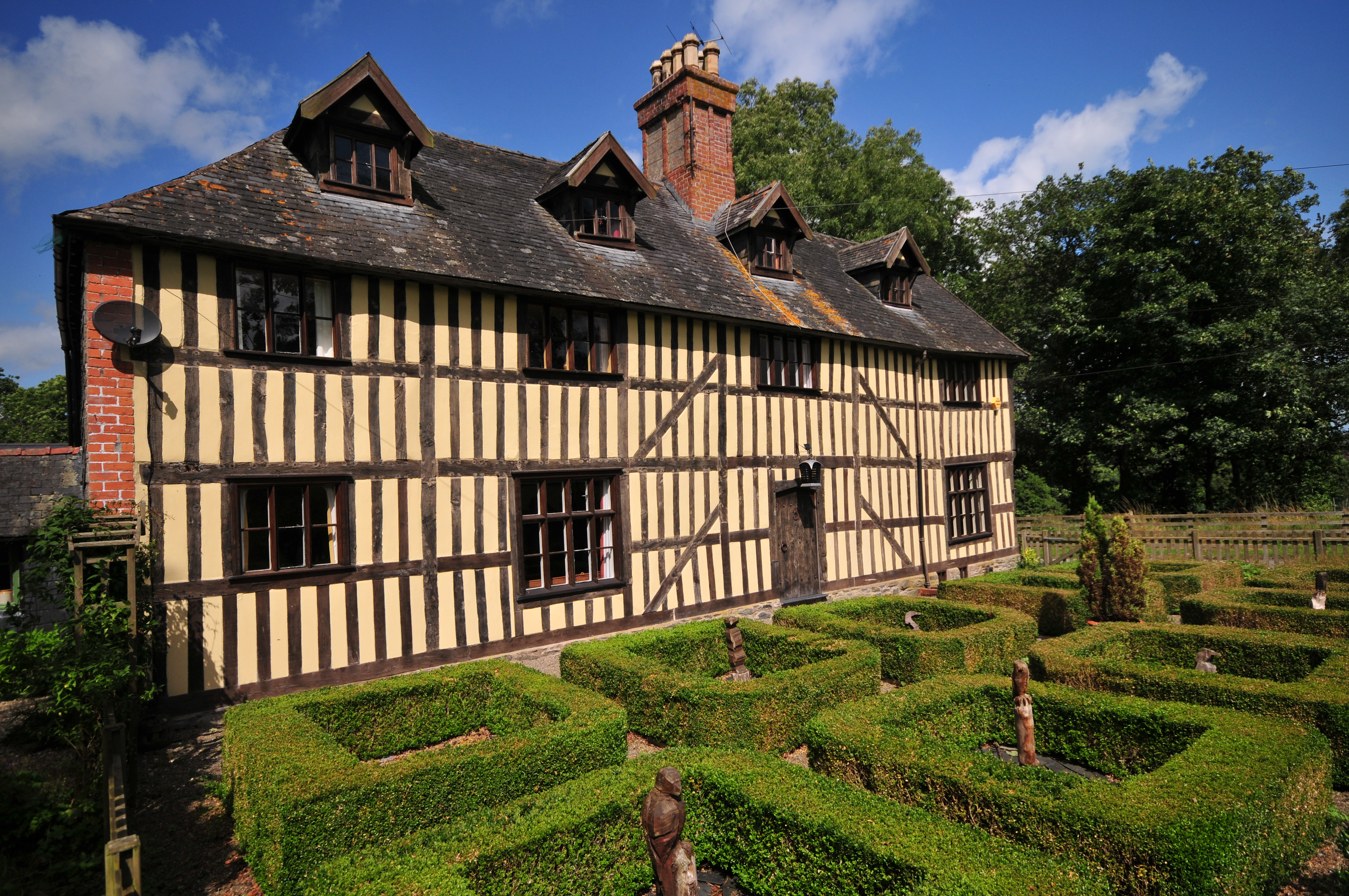
Talgarth front

The timber-framed lobby entrance house emerged in the mid-16th century in Mid Wales. The majority of these houses occur in Montgomeryshire with outliers in Radnorshire and Denbighshire. The chimney in these houses is generally in the middle of the house. There is no cross passage, unlike the Longhouses and the Snowdonia Houses and instead, the main doorway opens into a small lobby on the side of the fireplace. The chimney generally stands between the kitchen and the parlour. The key feature of these houses is the emphasis placed on the parlour, which takes the place of a hall.

A development of this are the Severn Valley Houses, which particularly congregate along the Severn Valley in Montgomeryshire, especially between Newtown and Welshpool. A typical feature of the Severn Valley houses are the elaborate entry porches to the houses which often have decorative scroll brackets supporting a jettied upper story. These porches often are added features to an earlier timber-framed house and lead directly into a lobby entrance. A well-known example of the Severn Valley type, which has added timber framed wings to the house is Trewern Hall near Welshpool. A house which has been dated by dendrochronology is Lower Cil on the outskirts of Berriew. This is a well-preserved farmhouse. Its left side is 16th-century (the square framing under the render was felled in 1583), probably a hall-house enlarged when the close-studded taller right end was rebuilt in the early 17th century to provide a new parlour and porch, both slightly jettied. The porch has open sides with turned rails, and the original inner door. The remodelling included the typical Severn Valley lobby-entry central chimney, with its triple-moulded brick stacks.

=== Snowdonia houses ===
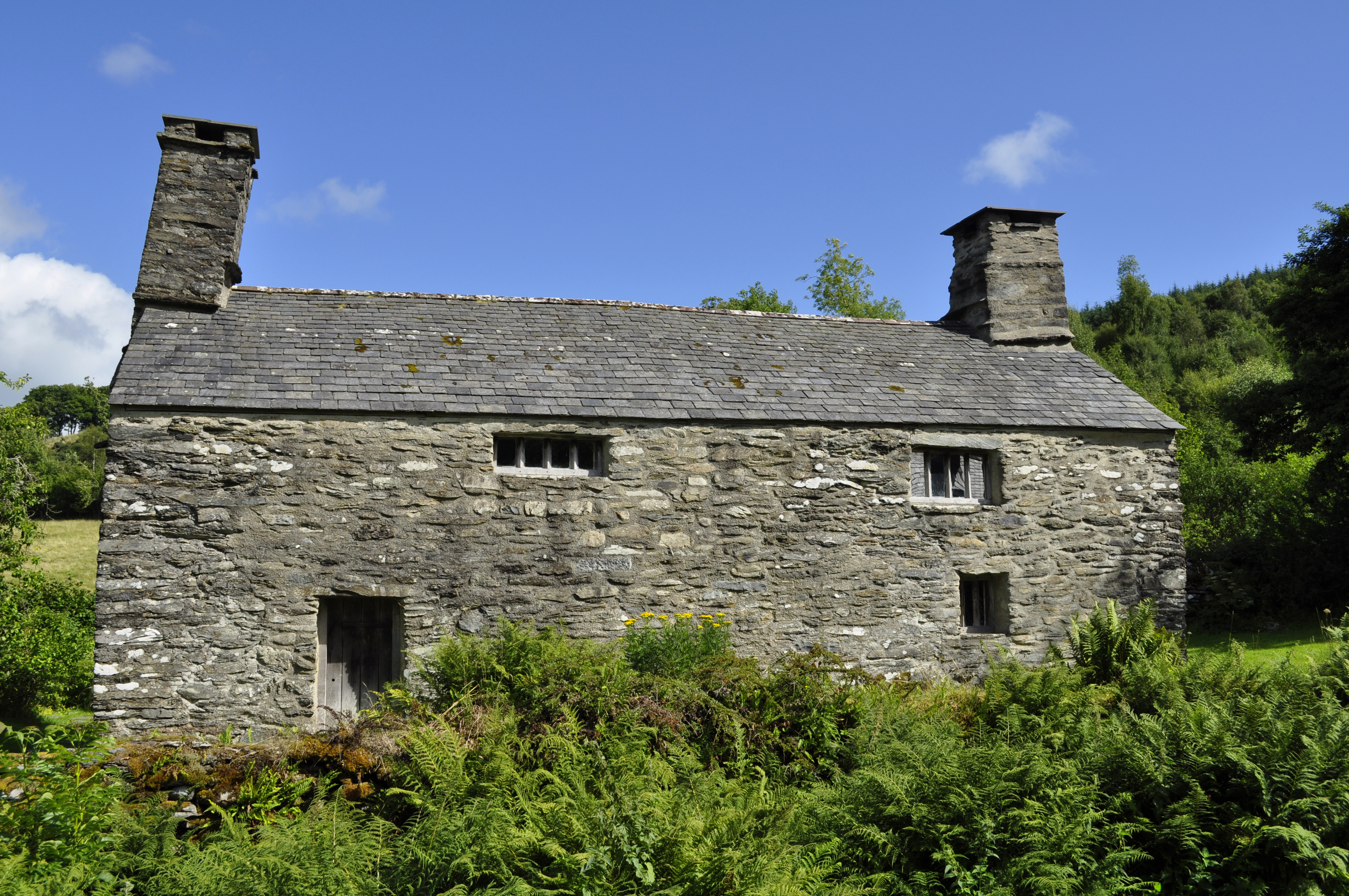
Tŷ Mawr Wybrnant

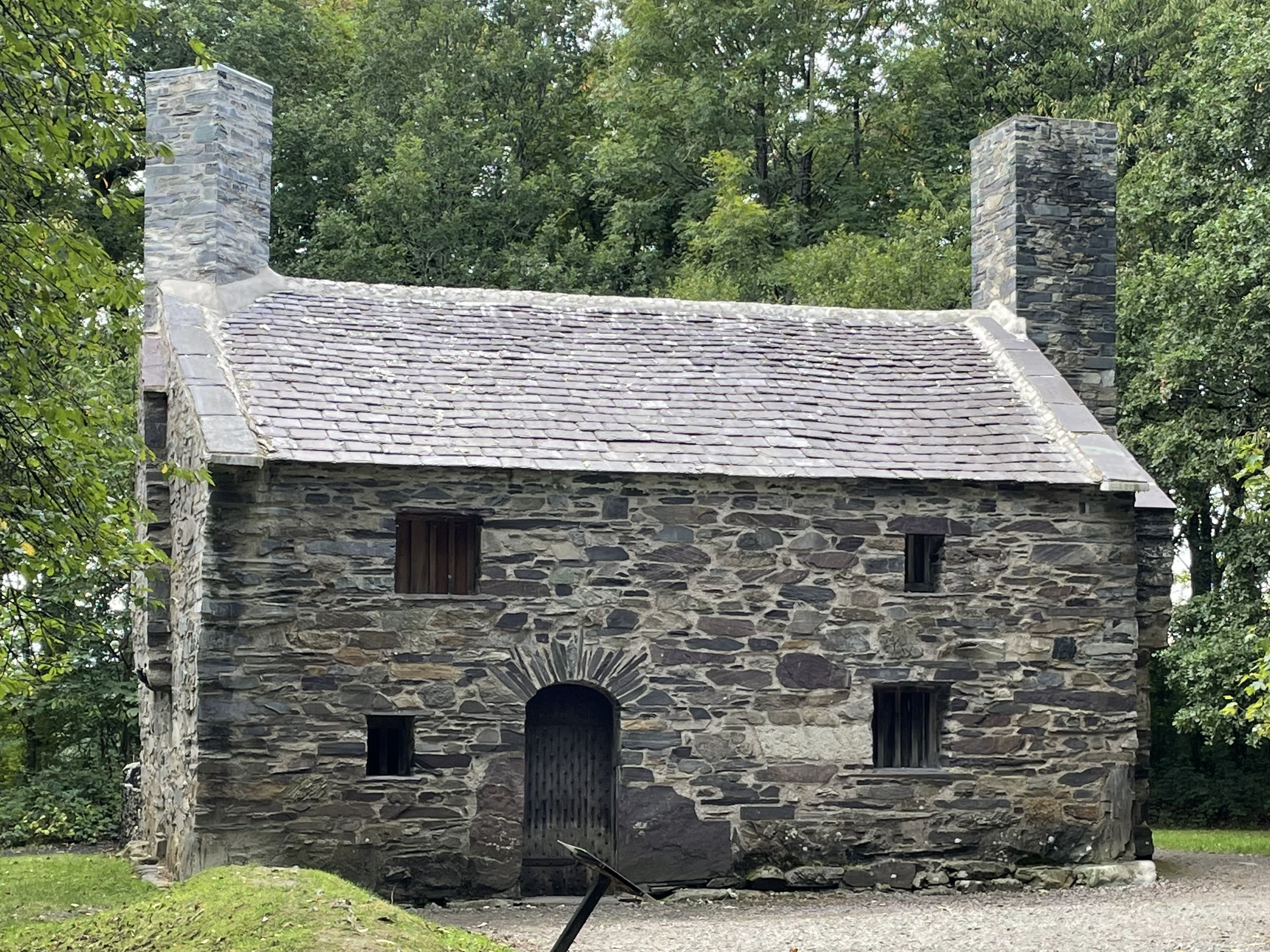
Y Garreg Fawr from Waunfawr, Gwynedd, at St Fagans

Snowdonia houses have recently been the subject of considerable study by the Royal Commission on the Ancient and Historical Monuments of Wales and the Dating Old Welsh Houses Group. These houses are typical of the Sub Medieval houses appearing in Wales in the earlier part the 16th century, which are a development from the Hall House. Characteristically Snowdonia Houses are now built on a vertical rather than horizontal plan with two or more storeys and lateral chimney stacks set against the end gables. The older cruck construction is now replaced with roofs constructed of trusses and purlins supported on stone walls. The centrally placed doorway may now be set under a massive stone cyclopean arch as at Faenol Fawr, Bodelwyddan or else under a fan arch of stone slabs as at Y Garreg Fawr. Y Garreg Fawr from Waenfawr in Caernarfonshire has been re-constructed at St Fagans and has been dated to 1544 The earliest example of a Snowdonia House dated by dendrochronology is Dugoed at Penmachno. This has been dated to 1516–1517. The nearby Tŷ Mawr Wybrnant, the birthplace of William Morgan, translator of the bible into Welsh, has been dated to 1565, but there is evidence that this was the re-building of an earlier cruck hall house of around 1500. The construction of the typical Snowdonia Houses continued into the 17th century, as at Cymbrychan at Llanfair which is dated 1612.

The distribution of Snowdonia-type houses extends into Aberconwy and Caernarfonshire. A good example of this type of house is the smaller house which stands immediately next to the mansion at Faenol Fawr near St Asaph. This is likely to be early 16th century in date. It appears to have been a two storied, hall house, with cruck framing and stone walls. The evidence for the cruck roof is from a photograph by the Rev N W Watson, and this roof may still be in place. Cyclopean doorways have been studied by Peter Smith.

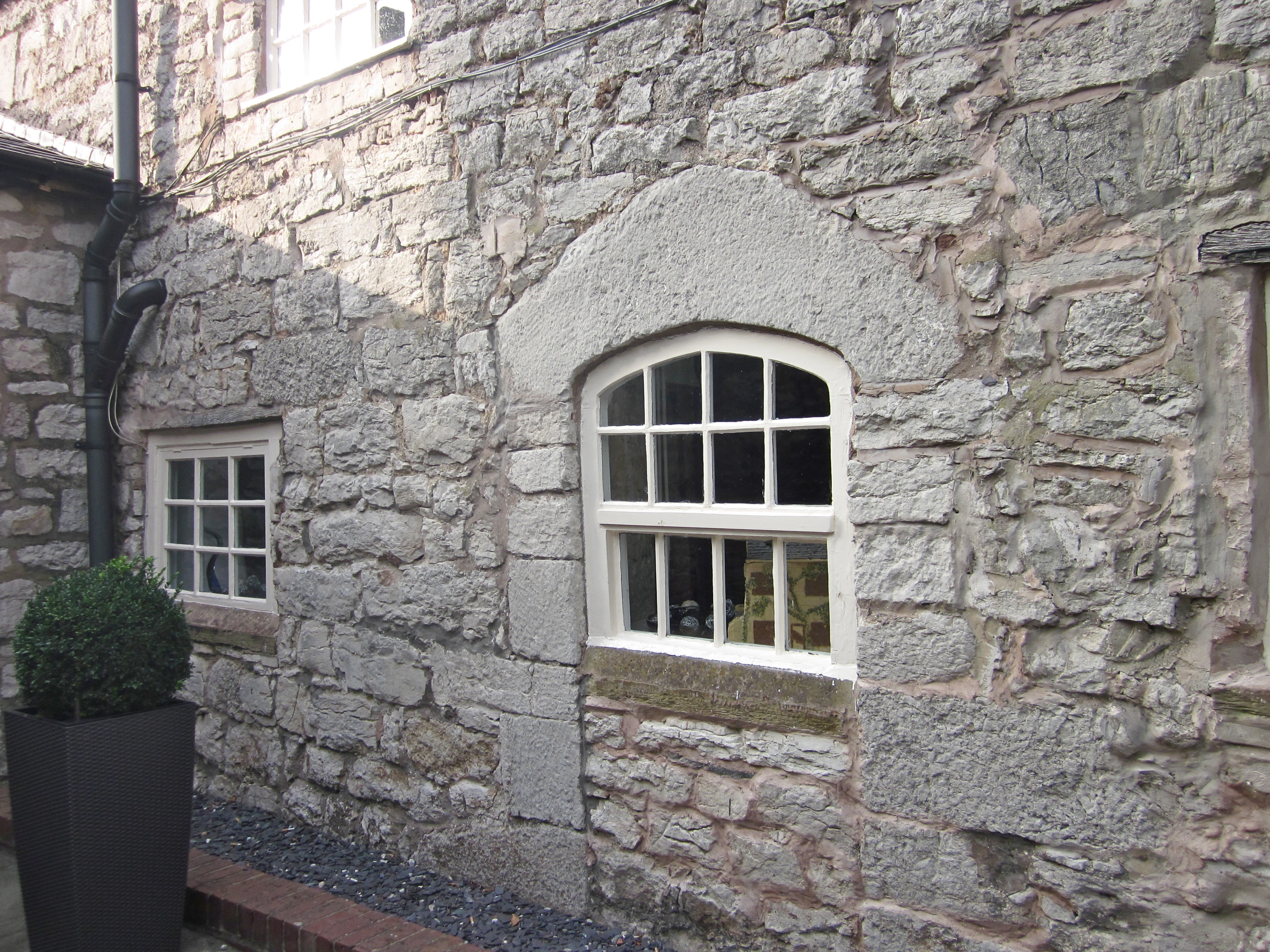
Faenol Fawr, Bodelwyddan Cyclopean lintel to blocked door

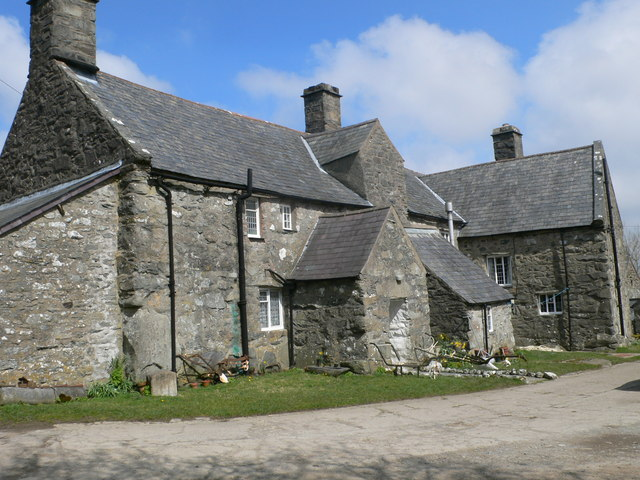
Gilar in Pentrevoelas

These massive arched stone door lintels were introduced at a time, probably around 1600, when stone walling was replacing timber framing and may encase an earlier timber structure. A much altered "post and panel" screens passage with three entrances, now in the hall area of the main house, is likely to have been removed from the hall in the older house. This screens passage would have been associated with the finely moulded beams in the older house. These moulded beams can be compared with similar beams at Maesycastell in Caernarvonshire and Perthywig in Denbighshire which are illustrated by Smith

Another example is Gilar in Pentrefoelas, presumably built by Cadwaladr ap Maurice after receiving a substantial grant of land from Henry VIII in 1545–1546

== Renaissance houses ==
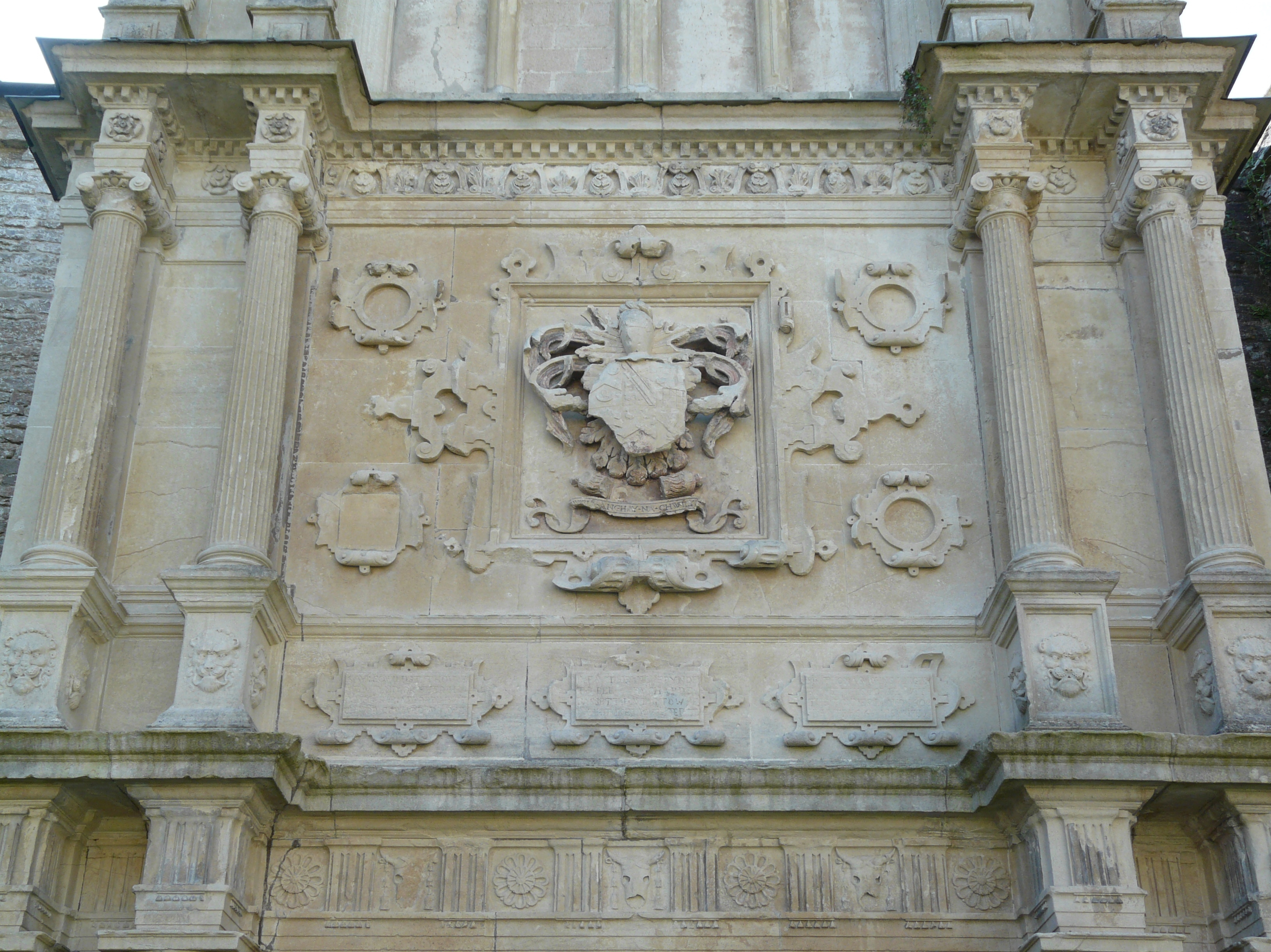
Old Beaupre, Cowbridge, detail on Courtyard Porch c. 1600

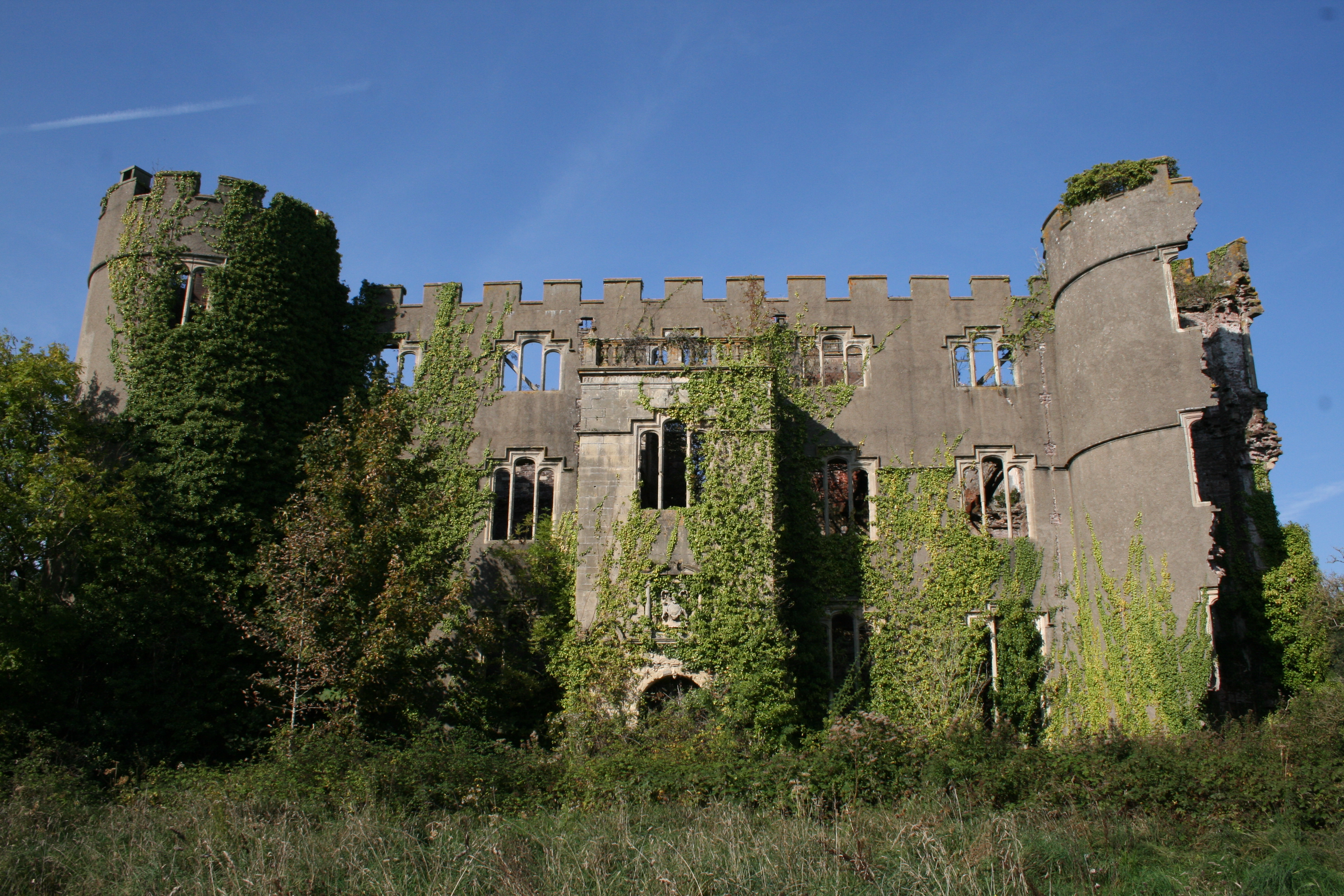
Ruperra Castle in 2011

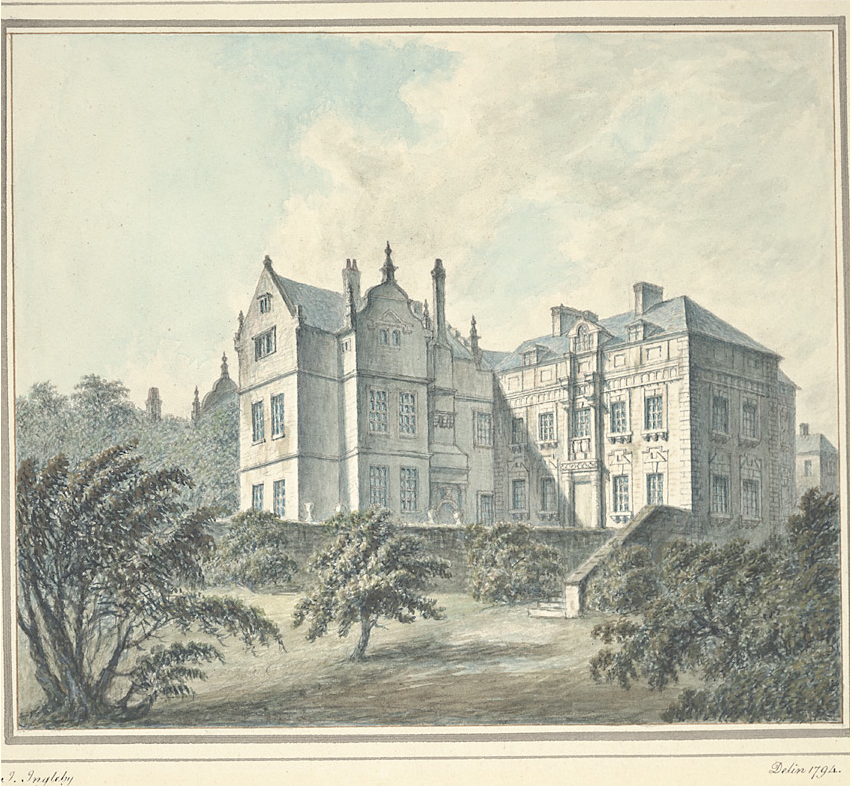
Brymbo Hall, Wrexham

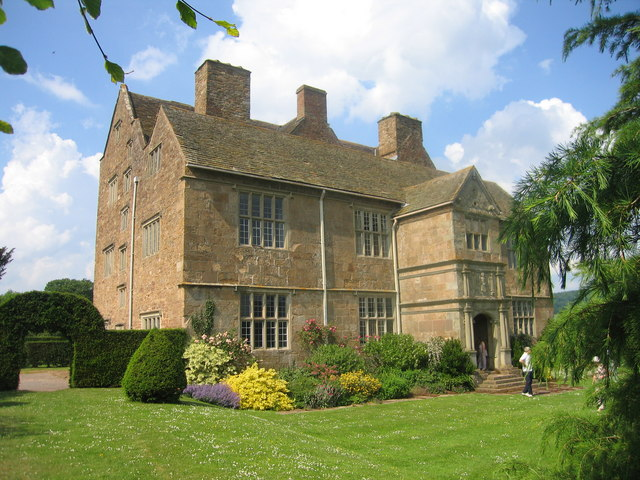
Treowen House

Renaissance architectural styles and influences start appearing in the eastern corners of Wales during the reign of Queen Elizabeth. In Glamorgan, an early example of Renaissance alteration was made to the facade of the outer gatehouse of the now ruined Old Beaupre, near Cowbridge in 1580. This was followed by the more striking Porch in the inner courtyard of 1600 at Old Beaupre. A later and more developed example of Renaissance architecture is Ruperra Castle, built in 1628 for the Welshman Sir Thomas Morgan and the design ideas may originate from his travels on the Continent. The castle is rectangular in layout with round towers at the corners. A feature of Ruperra is the rectangular three-light windows with drip moulds, with the centre light higher than the side lights. These windows appear on other Welsh Renaissance houses. The Castle is rectangular with round corner towers and a Porch with a classical doorway. As the result of a fire in 1941, it now stands partly ruined. In the north-east of Wales, a very important surviving Renaissance house was Plas Teg near Mold. Rectangular in form with rectangular corner towers it is the typical form of Renaissance house seen over much of Europe. A close parallel would be the first phase (unfinished) of Drumlanrig Castle in Scotland. Another important Renaissance house, demolished in 1973, was Brymbo Hall near Wrexham. The house was built for John Griffith in 1625 and a Baroque wing was added later in that century. The core of the house was in brick with a fine classical doorway. Fortunately a watercolour by John Ingleby in the National Library of Wales records this building. A further example of the Renaissance classicism was the Banqueting Hall at Margam Abbey. This was recorded by Thomas Dineley in 1684, but only the stone facade now remains, erected in its present position in 1835. It is three bays wide with fluted Ionic columns carrying richly detailed entablatures.

== Major houses in north Wales ==
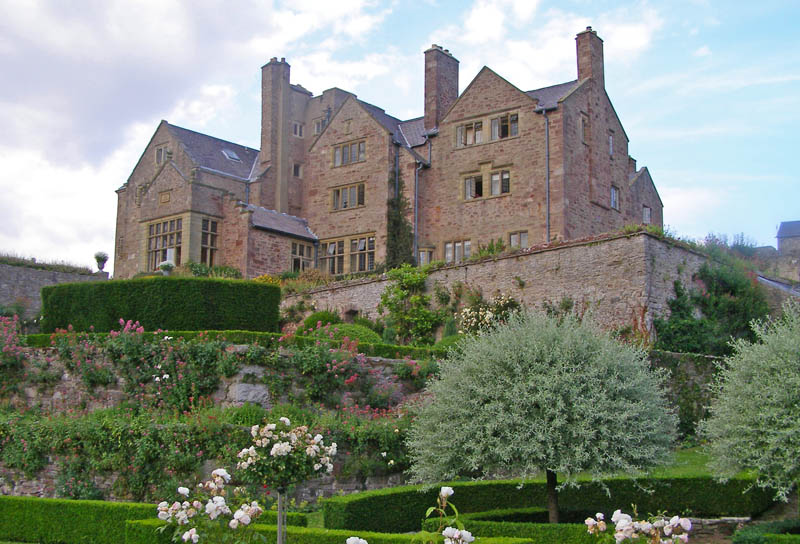
Bodysgallen

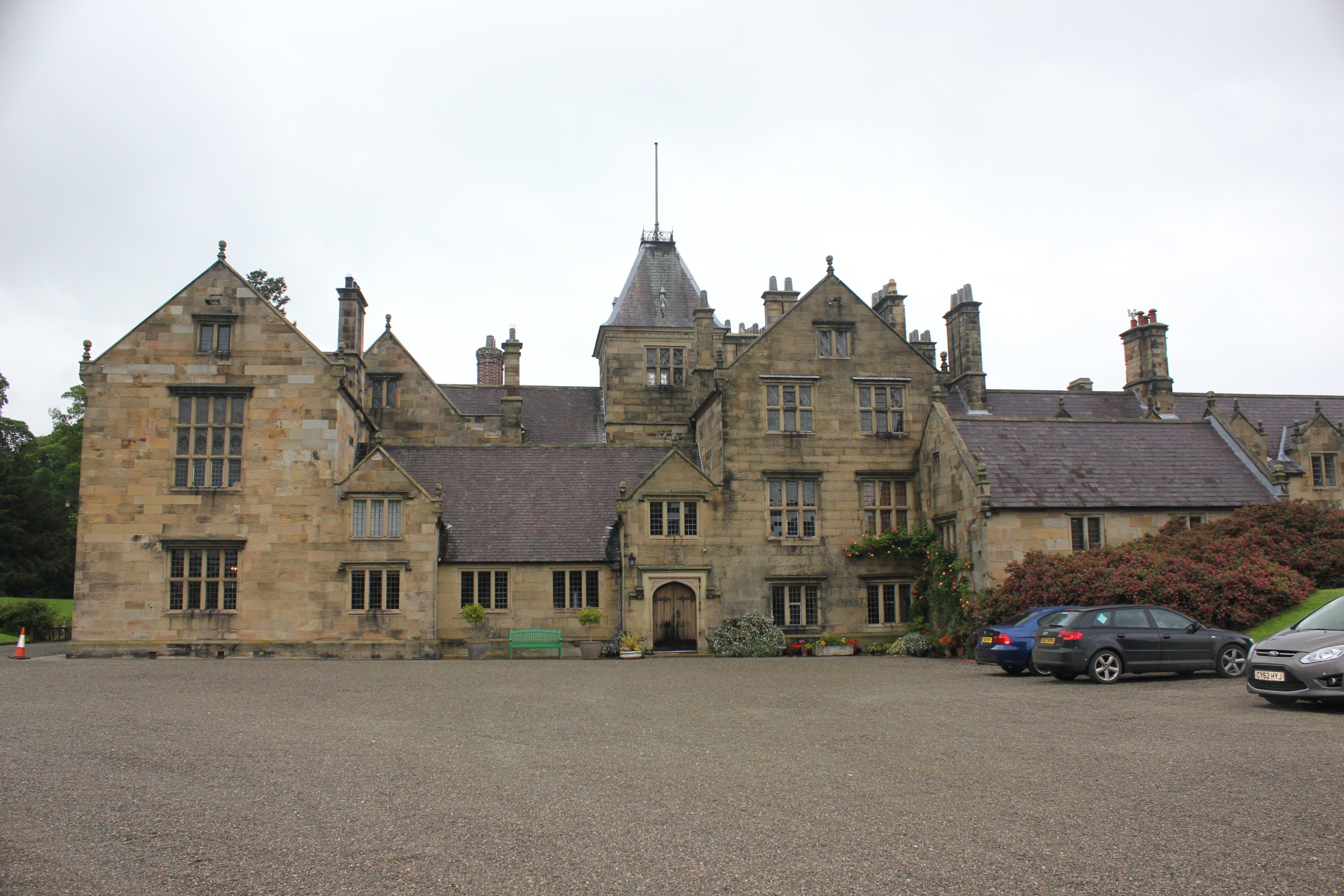
Mostyn Hall, Flintshire

The major houses built in the 16th and earlier 17th centuries are often difficult to classify on stylistic grounds. The Welsh families who built them often were less interested in the outside display of architectural features and more interested in the interior decoration, particularly elaborate plasterwork, painted walls and elaborately carved woodwork with armorials commemorating their family descent. Many of these houses such as Bodysgallen, which was started in 1620 and Mostyn Hall are an amalgamation of different styles of architecture over many years. The front is of 1631–1632. In the case of Nercwys Hall near Mold it is known that the contractor who built the Hall was Raffe Booth of Chester and the plans for the house were drawn up by his carpenter Evan Jones. The contract for the building is 1637 and the datestone on the building is 1637.

The influence of English architectural fashion can also be seen in Hen Blas, at Llanasa in Flintshire. Built in 1645 at the start of the Civil War it is built of the local stone with ashlar facing. As Edward Hubbard remarks

Another notable house is Gloddaeth near Llandudno, which retains its hall still up the original hammer-beam roof and also a painted dais above the high table at the end of the hall.

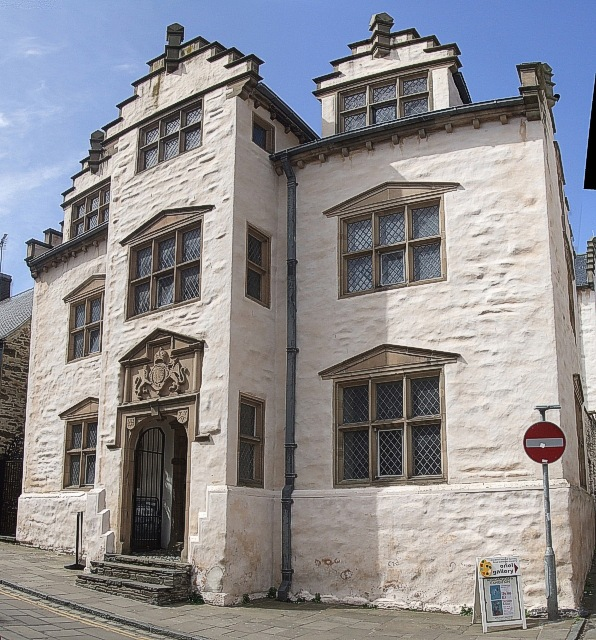
Plas Mawr, Conwy

The Old Hall at Y Faenol (Y Vaynol), Y Felinheli (Port Dinorwic) is an E-shaped building consisting of low 16th-century blocks with a more ornate right wing, which was probably added in the 1660s by Sir Griffith Williams. This has a crow stepped gable.

Plas Mawr in Conwy is one of the most impressive surviving courtyard houses of this period, which has recently been restored by Cadw. An Elizabethan townhouse, dating from the 16th century. The property was built by Robert Wynn, a member of the local gentry, following his marriage to his first wife, Dorothy Griffith. Plas Mawr occupied a plot of land off Conwy's High Street and was constructed in three phases between 1576 and 1585 at a total cost of around £800. These three phases of house construction – 1576–77, 1580 and 1585 – were probably overseen by several different senior craftsmen, possibly working to an original plan determined by a surveyor or mason working at the English royal court. Judging by the details of the roof design, a single master carpenter may have been used for all three parts of the build.

=== Plasterwork, painted interiors and woodwork ===
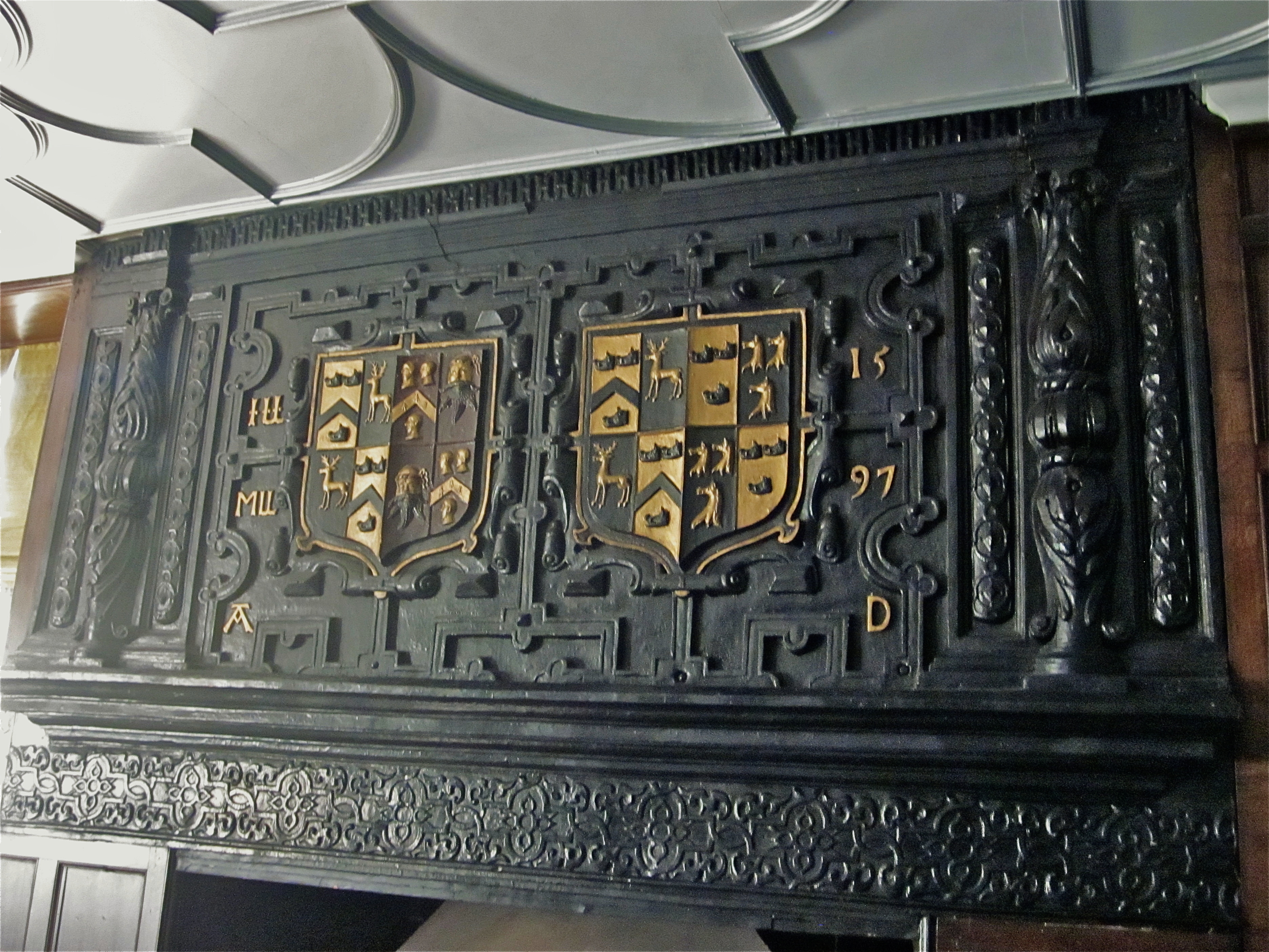
Faenol Fawr, Bodelwyddan. South wing interior. Lloyd Armorials of 1597 over fireplace

At Plas Mawr seven rooms still possess elements of their original plasterwork, which Peter Smith has described as "the most perfect and the most complete memorial to Elizabethan Wales", and their original wooden carved panels that line the walls. The plasterwork includes extensive heraldry, badges and symbols: in the upper north range alone, 22 different heraldic emblems are moulded into the ceilings and walls. The gatehouse shows the royal arms, as do the great chamber and the parlour, probably because they were intended to host senior guests. The badges of numerous monarchs are included throughout the house, including those of Richard II, Richard III, Henry IV and Henry VII. The badges of other prominent nobles, such as Robert Dudley, are also featured in the house.

The plasterwork in the parlour displays the arms of Robert Wynn himself, and the brewhouse shows the combined arms of the Wynn and Griffith families, which are generally given equal prominence throughout the house. Robert Wynn's arms are most prominent in the hall and the bedchambers, where the royal arms are smaller and less prominent. In the 16th century, Wynn's heraldry would probably have been echoed in the furnishings of the house, including the fabrics, cups and silverware. The plasterwork also incorporates a number of classical themes, but these are not as well executed as the badges and other emblems: Turner describes them as "rather token additions", and Smith considers this part of the decoration to be "naive". At Maenan Hall near Llanrwst, there is splendid plaster work which is dated 1582 and, at Portmeirion Town Hall, Clough Williams-Ellis was able to preserve the mid-17th-century plaster ceiling from Emral Hall in Maelor Gymraeg.

=== Earlier brick-built houses of the late 16th and 17th centuries ===
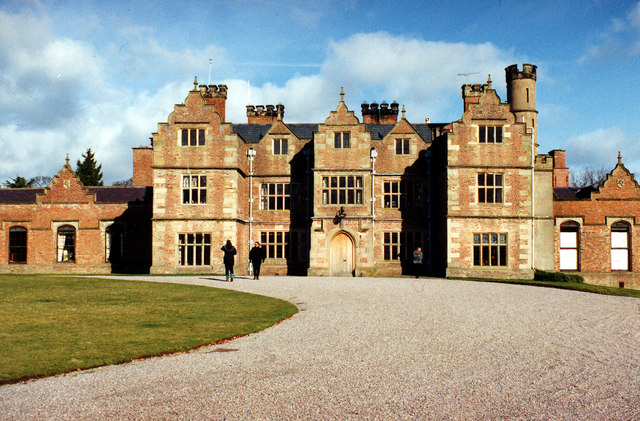
Brynkinalt Hall, Chirk, 1612

Sir Richard Clough built Bachegraig, one of the earliest brick buildings in Wales in 1567, heavily influenced by Flemish brick builders. Slowly, brick building in Wales became fashionable, but in some areas of Western and southwestern Wales only starts to appear in the 19th century. Brick makers tended to be itinerant until the mid-19th century, digging clay and firing bricks took place close to the building that was to be constructed. One of the more permanent brickyards was the Herbert's (Earls of Chirbury) brickyard at Stalloe near Montgomery, which would have been the likely source for the impressive New Build at Montgomery Castle and for large quantities of bricks used in building of the service wings at Lymore near Montgomery 1664–67 and also for 17th-century brick-faced town houses in Montgomery and possibly Welshpool. The earliest use of brick in the 16th century was for the construction of massive chimney stacks of Stellar form with multiple flues within timber-framed houses. These stacks would have greatly reduced the risk of fire, and the study by Peter Smith of the distribution of these stacks shows them to be clustered along the Welsh border from Montgomeryshire northwards.

While brick making may have started by Flemish brick makers working for Sir Richard Clough, building in brick was also becoming established in Shropshire and in Cheshire. The earliest of the typical Elizabethan Houses using brick with stone dressing was Trevalyn Hall built for John Trevor in 1576 Brick with stone dressing was used for the construction of Brynkinalt at Chirk, near to the Welsh border with England. This is an E-plan house of Elizabethan or Jacobean appearance that was built for Sir Edward Trevor in 1612

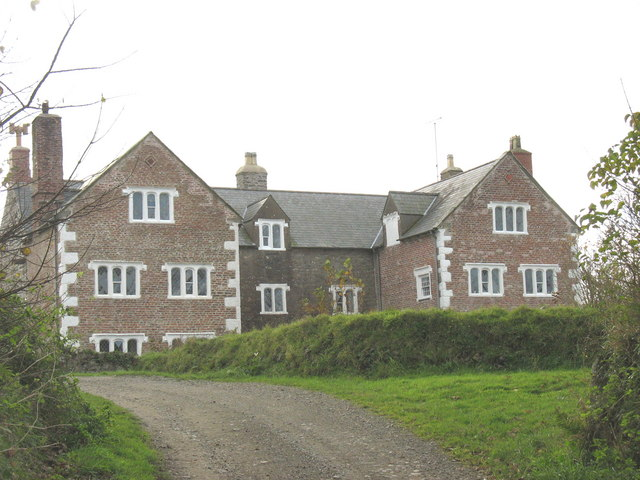
Bodwrda, Aberdaron

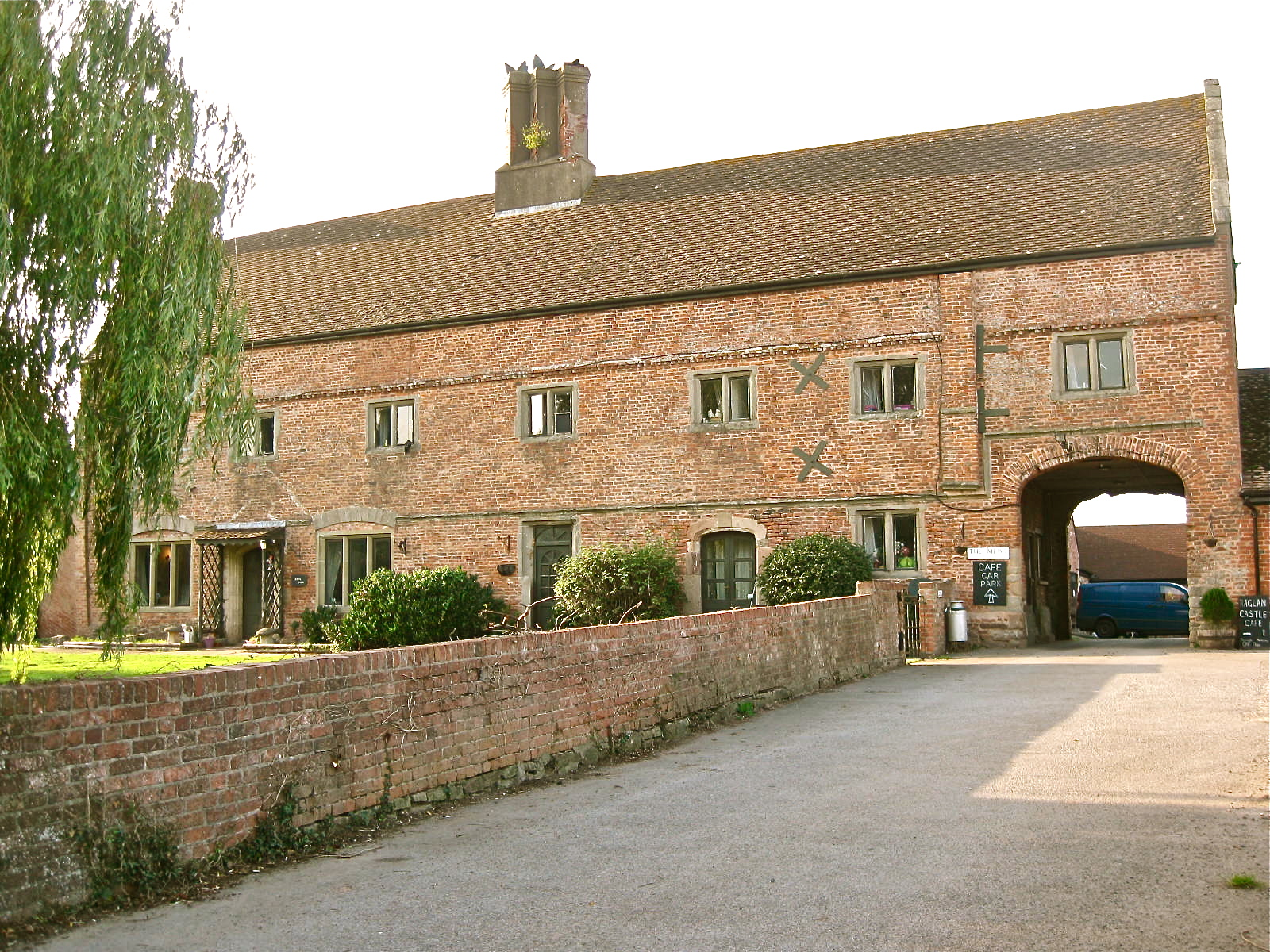
Castle Farm, Raglan

It has been noted that Brymbo Hall (1625) was largely brick, but the Cheshire influence of brick building is also apparent in Halghton Hall in Maelor Gymraeg of 1662 In Montgomeryshire the earliest brick house was the New Build at Montgomery Castle, which was built for Edward Herbert by Scampion between 1622 and 1625. Bodwrdda, near Aberdaron on the Llyn peninsular provides an example of an earlier house that was re-fronted in brick in 1621. In Monmouthshire the establishment of brick building is shown by the massive brick service block (now Castle Farmhouse, Raglan) that was built for the older branch of the Herbert family for Raglan Castle, probably just before the English Civil War.

== Earlier housing in towns ==
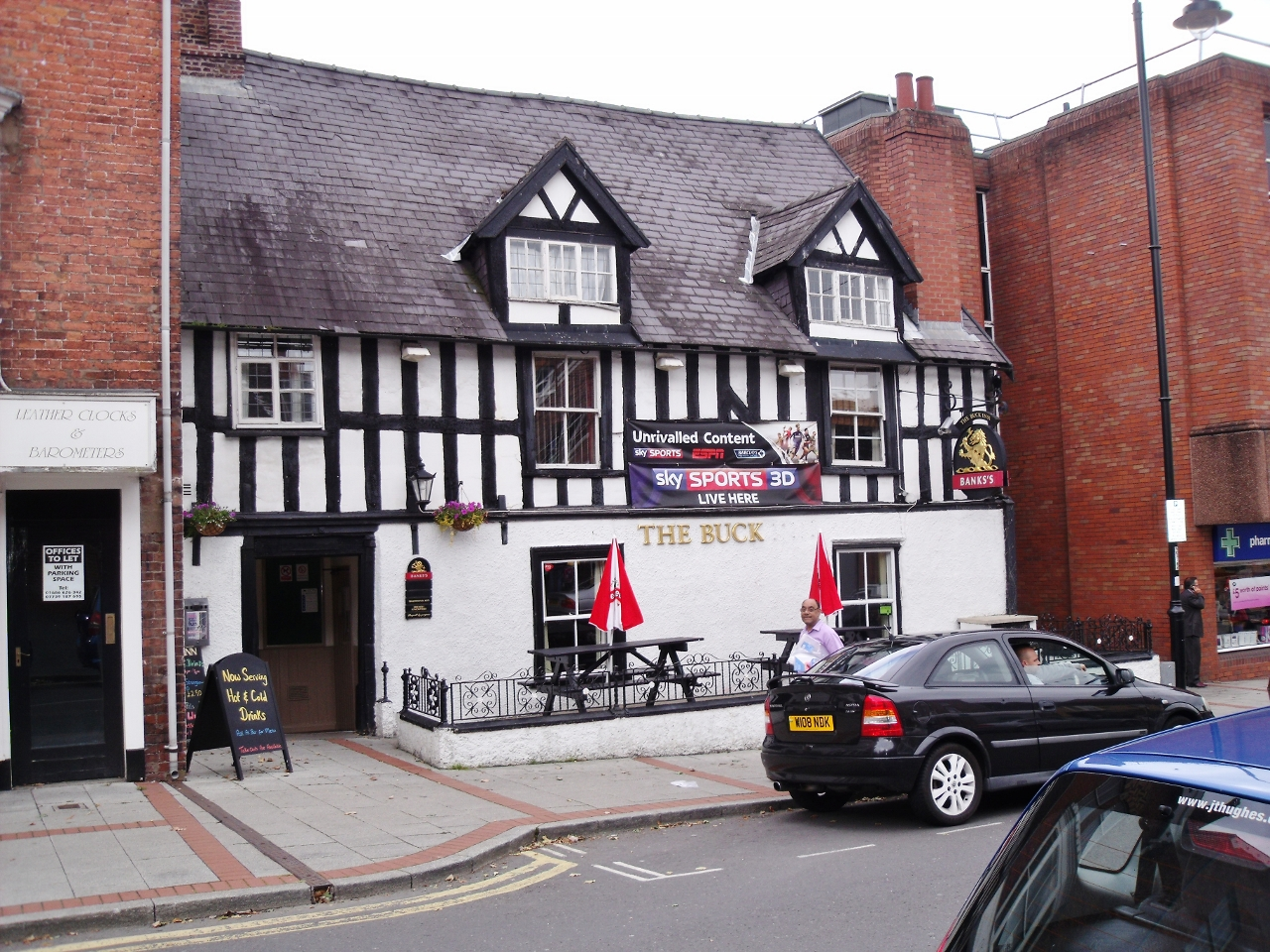
The Buck Inn, Newtown

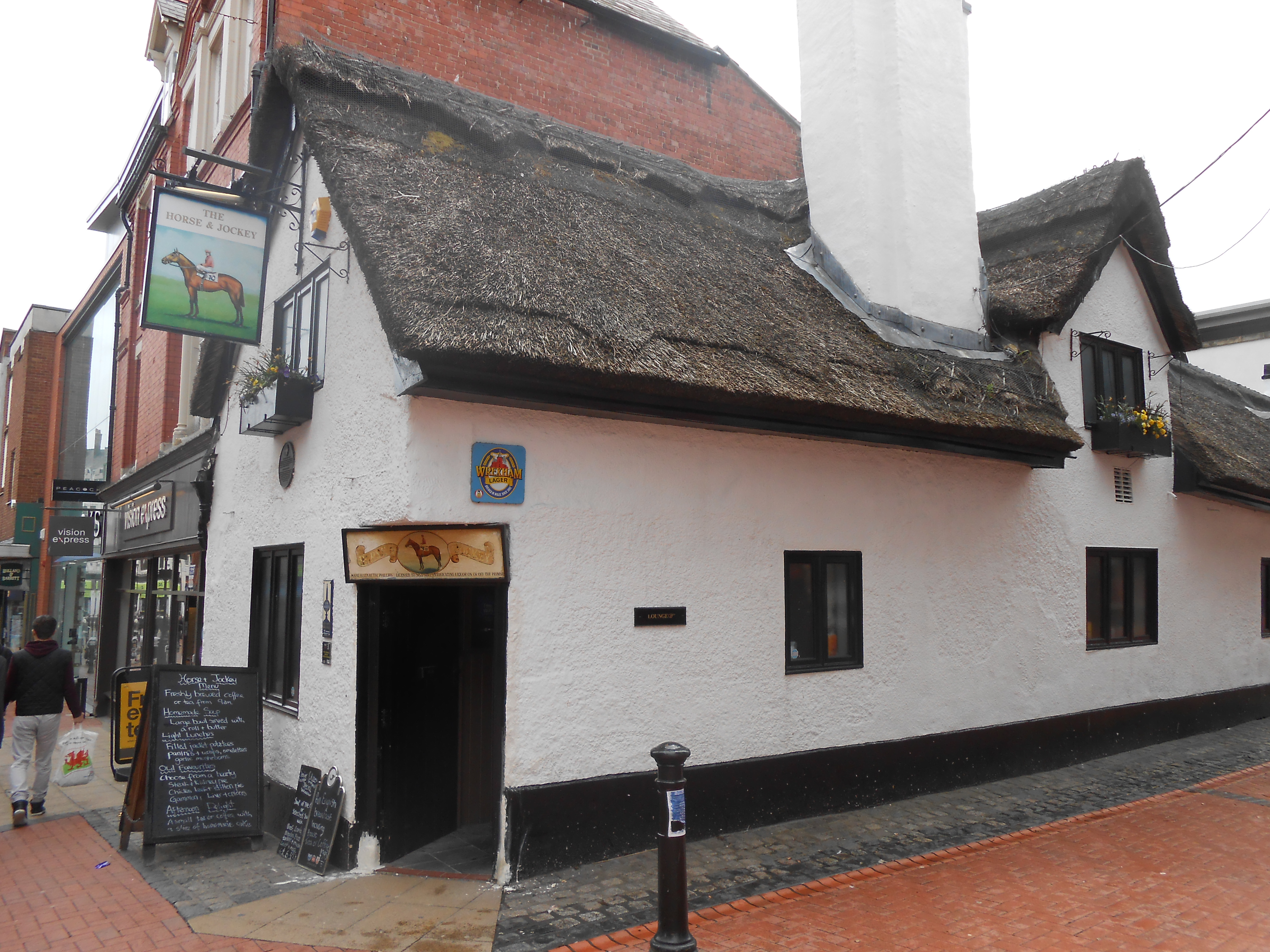
Thatched Horse and Jockey in Wrexham

Timber-framed houses of the 15th to 18th century are present in many of the Welsh towns in North, Central and SE Wales. The distribution of these houses has been mapped by Peter Smith who shows that in some areas in Wales such as Glamorgan and Anglesey, timber-framed houses were being built in towns, but not in the countryside, where stone would have been the usual building material. Modern commercial development has tended to remove most of the timber-framed houses from the high streets of Welsh towns, leaving the occasional examples, often public houses such as the Buck in Newtown and the thatched Horse and Jockey in Wrexham. Many more examples of timber-framed houses exist behind brick facades of the 18th and 19th centuries. This is particularly the case in the small market town of Montgomery, where the Herbert family encouraged the inhabitants to rebuild the houses with brick frontages from the 1670s onward.

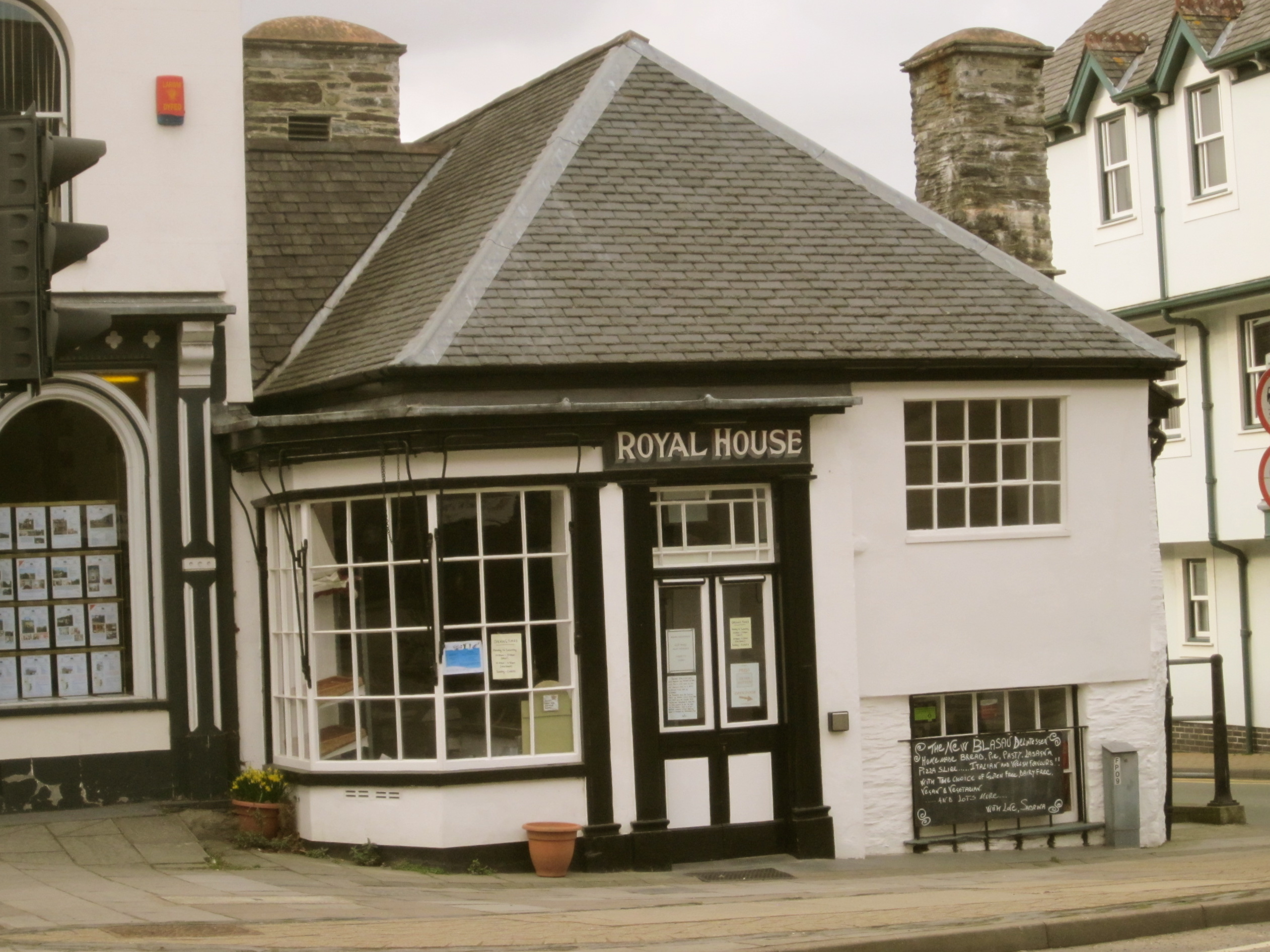
Royal House, Machynlleth 1559–61

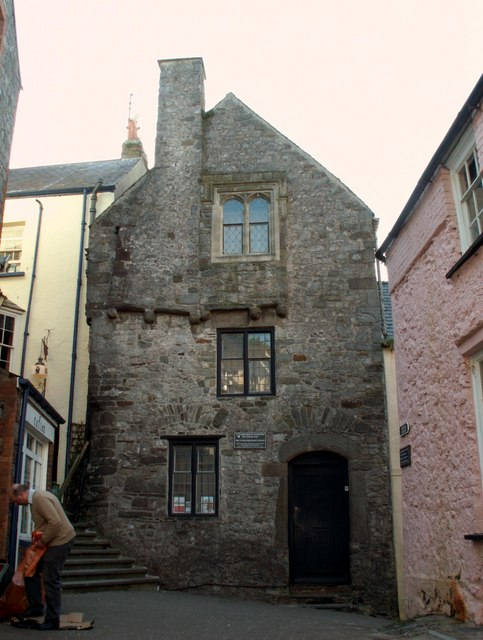
Tudor Merchant's House on Quay Hill, Tenby.

The Royal House in Machynlleth is a rare example of a relatively unaltered mercer's dwelling and store-house and has some claim to be one of the oldest shops in Wales. Dendrochronological or Tree ring dates indicate it was built between 1559 and 1561. It was said that Owain Glyndŵr imprisoned David Gam there, and it was also said that King Charles I stayed at the house when travelling to Chester – hence the origin of the name 'Royal House'. It occupies one of the original Medieval burgage plots laid out around 1291. The long range has three parts with a house set between an upper shop and a lower store.

Another early trading house was Aberconwy House in Castle Street, Conwy, now in the care of the National Trust. It is the one survivor of a group of merchant cum warehouses of the English merchants who traded in Conwy. It is a three-storey building, the first two storeys of which have stone rubble walls and the upper is a jettied out timber-framed construction. It has been tree ring dated to about 1420. In Tenby, there is the Tudor Merchants House on Quay Hill, also in the care of the National Trust. This dates from the late 15th century and is possibly the most complete medieval merchant's house in Wales. Stone built with three storeys and the roof consists of five bays of crucks. At the third floor level, a lateral chimney stack and a mullioned window are corbelled out and there is a large cylindrical chimney stack to the north. There is some painted decoration inside. The house appears to have been part of a larger merchant's complex.

== Market malls and town halls ==
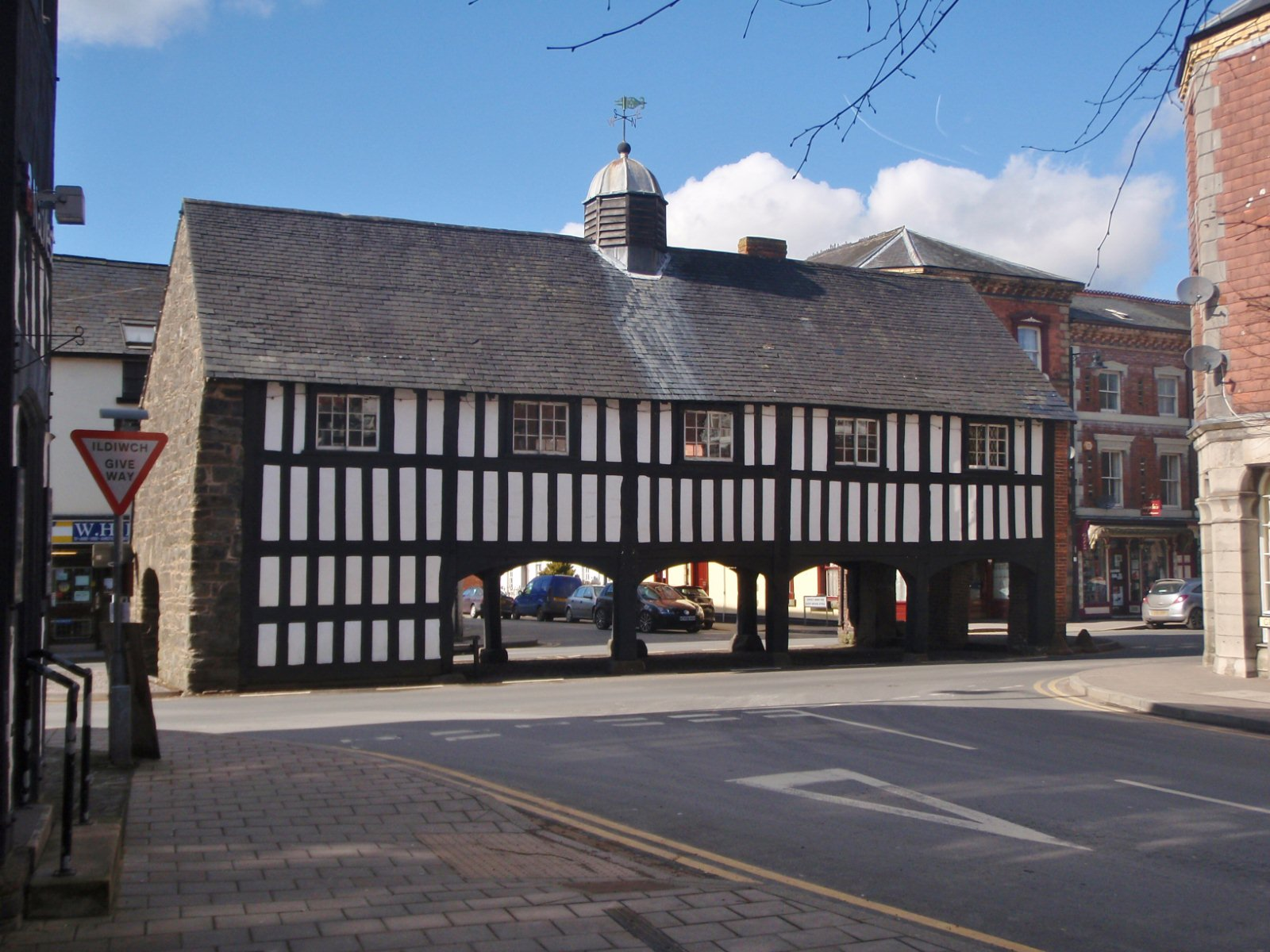
Llanidloes Market hall

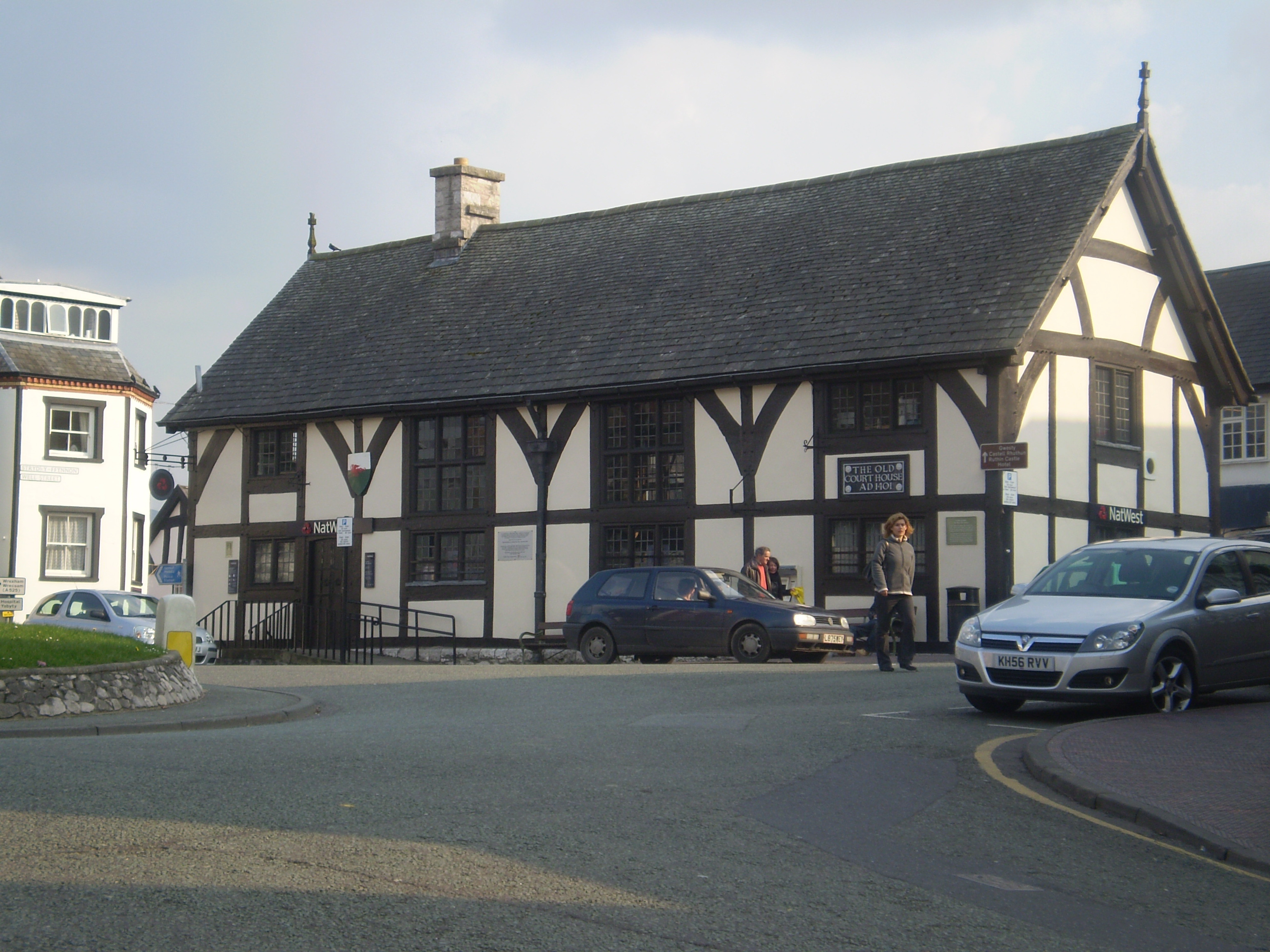
The Old Court House Ruthin Wales dated to 1421

Many shire halls were timber framed, but the only surviving example of this type is at Llanidloes in Montgomeryshire. The Court House in Ruthin, now the National Westminster Bank, probably served a similar purpose and Dendrochronological dating has recently shown that this building is earlier and the timbers used for its construction were felled in 1421 The Old Market Hall in Llanidloes is known to have been constructed from trees felled between 1611 and 1622 A slightly earlier town built of stone is the Shire Hall at Denbigh of 1572, with an open colonnaded Market Hall on the ground-floor and a council and court room on the first-floor. In the 1780s with a new roof, rusticated entrance and new fenestration, including Venetian windows were added. The colonnades have been enclosed

In the Georgian period, much more impressive town halls started to be built and the Shire Hall at Monmouth is a particularly good example. It is in a classical style of Bath stone by Fisher of Bristol with giant Ionic pilasters

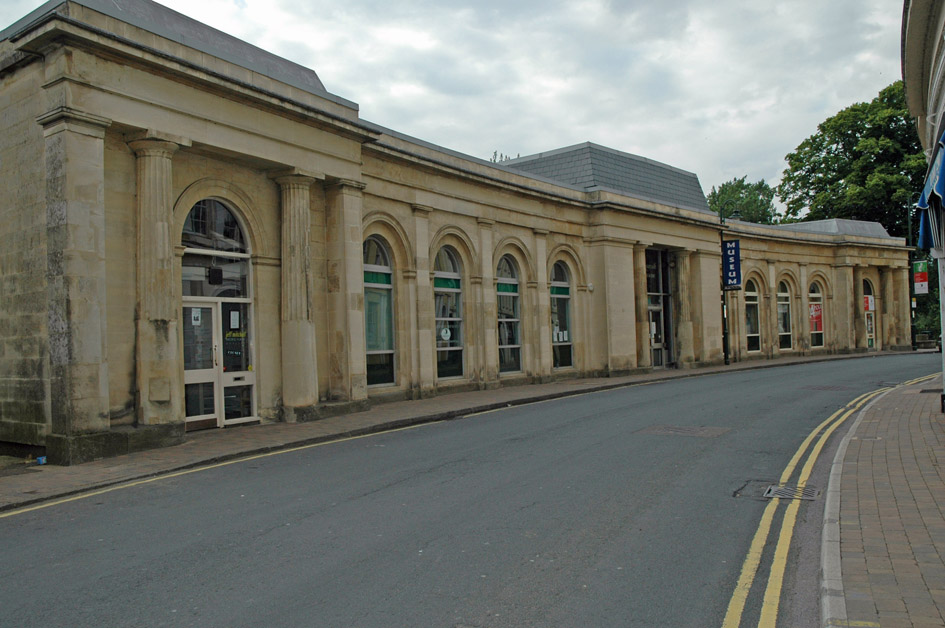
Market Hall at Monmouth 1837-9

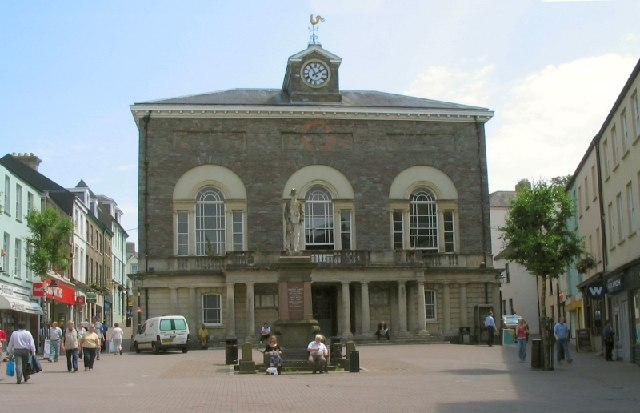
Carmarthen Guildhall 1767–77

An important building, although altered, in Palladian style is Sir Robert Taylor's Guildhall at Carmarthen, built between 1767 and 1777. This has a trio of giant first floor windows which are over-arched over large Palladian windows with Ionic columns and with blind panels above. Taylor used similar windows to light the Court Room of the Bank of England In the 19th century, the design of Market Halls changed, they were now single-storied and larger areas were made available for trading. A particularly notable example now houses the Nelson Museum and local history centre in Monmouth. This was built in Bath stone in the Greek Doric style by the architect George Vaughan Maddox of Monmouth in 1837–1839

== Bridges ==
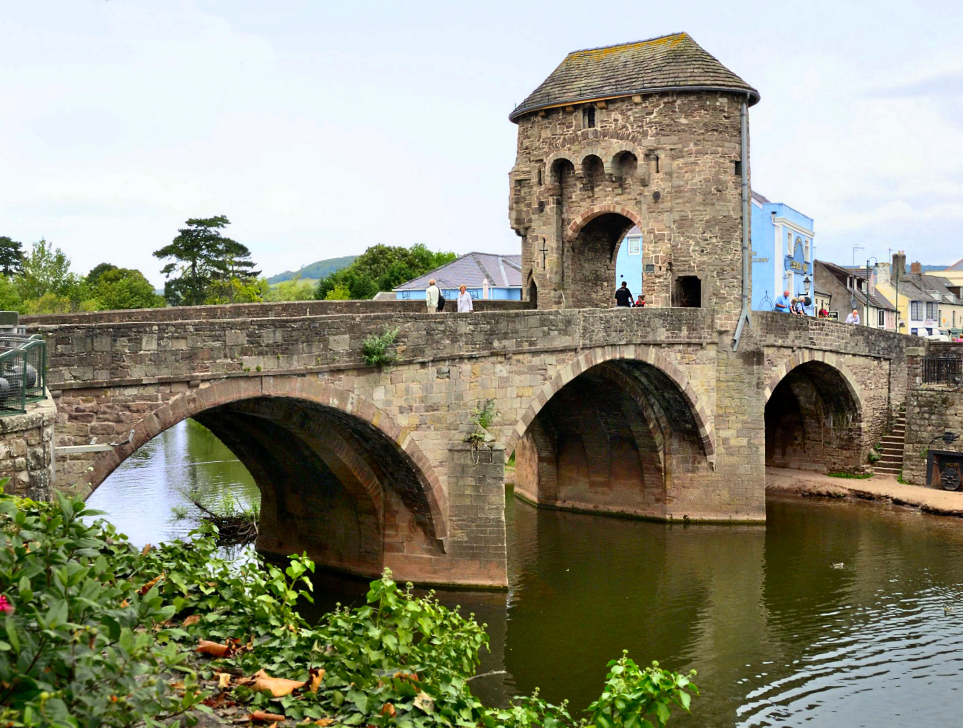
Monnow Bridge, Monmouth c. 1297–1315.

The best known early bridge in Wales is over the river Conwy at Llanrwst which is often attributed to Inigo Jones. The bridge has three arches and a steep camber. The bridge was constructed in 1634 four Lancashire masons, Barnard Wood, James Stott, Thomas Crompton and John Mellor. They may well have working to designs drawn up by Jones based on a design by Palladio. Sir Richard Wynn of nearby Gwydir, as Treasurer to the Queen, is likely to have known Jones and commissioned work from his master mason Nicholas Stone. An earlier bridge, with nine arches is at Holt over the River Dee, dated to 1254,' which is still in use. This bridge is commemorated by a famous painting by Richard Wilson, now in the National Gallery, which also shows the gatehouse chapel which stood at the east end. Another early bridge which still has a standing gatehouse is Monnow Bridge at Monmouth which was constructed as part of the town defences during the period 1297–1315.

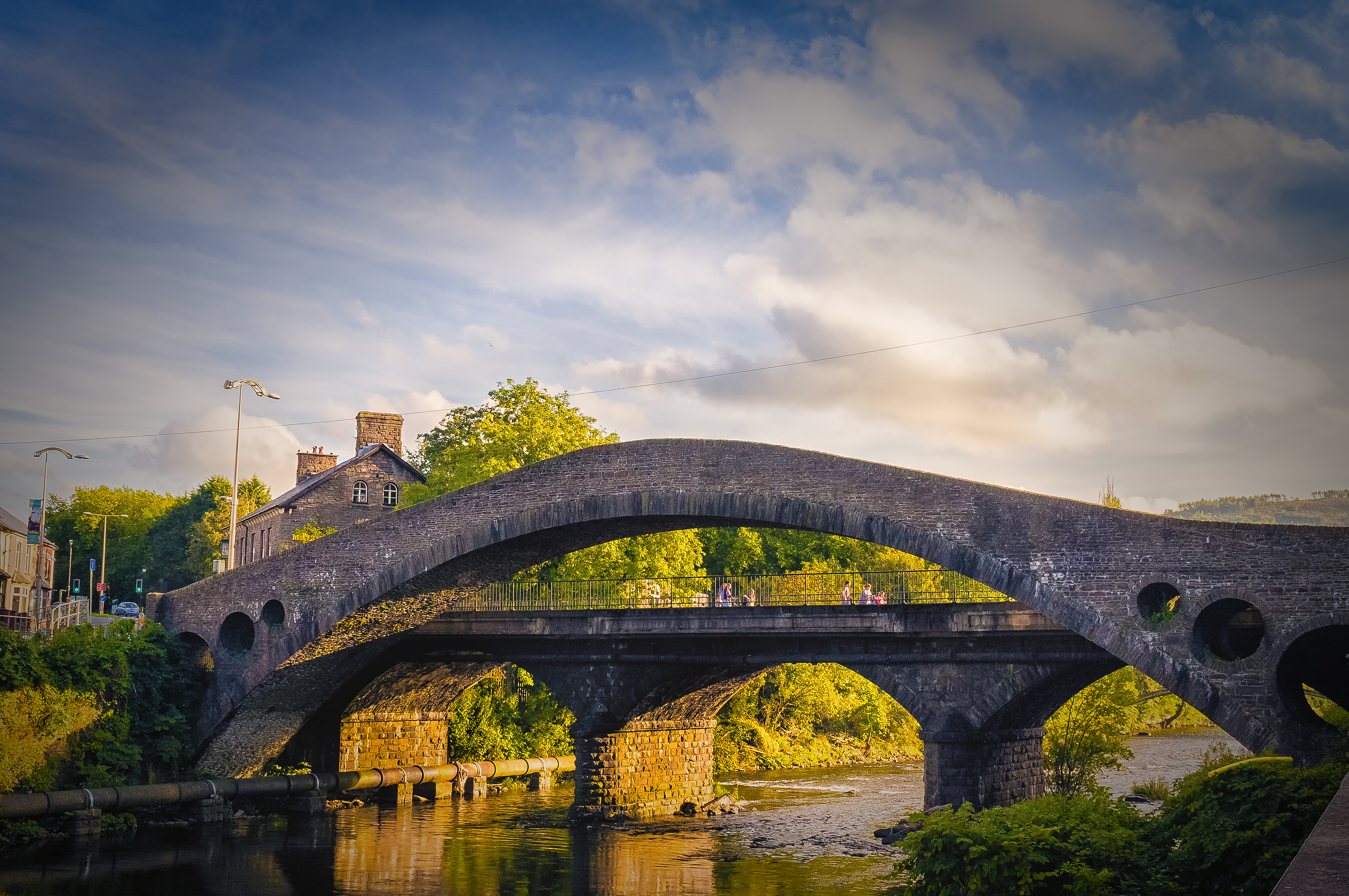
The Old Bridge, Pontypridd.

In south Wales a notable bridge architect and engineer was William Edwards (1719–1789), who in 1746 was contracted to build a new bridge over the River Taff at Pontypridd. The first bridge was washed away and the second bridge collapsed, but his third bridge was a single arch bridge of 140 feet, then the largest of the type in the world, which he completed in 1756, which is still standing, now known as the Old Bridge. In order to reduce the weight of the bridge he pierced large cylindrical holes through the spandrels of the bridge, which solved a constructional problem and gives it its elegant appearance.

A number of fine bridges were built in Montgomeryshire in the 18th century, which include Llandrinio bridge of 1769–1775, probably by the noted Shrewsbury bridge builder John Gwynn. An ashlar bridge of three arches of pink sandstone, with rusticated voussoirs. Another impressive bridge is the single arched bridge at Dolanog over the Vyrnwy, which was portrayed by the artist Edward Pugh in 1813.

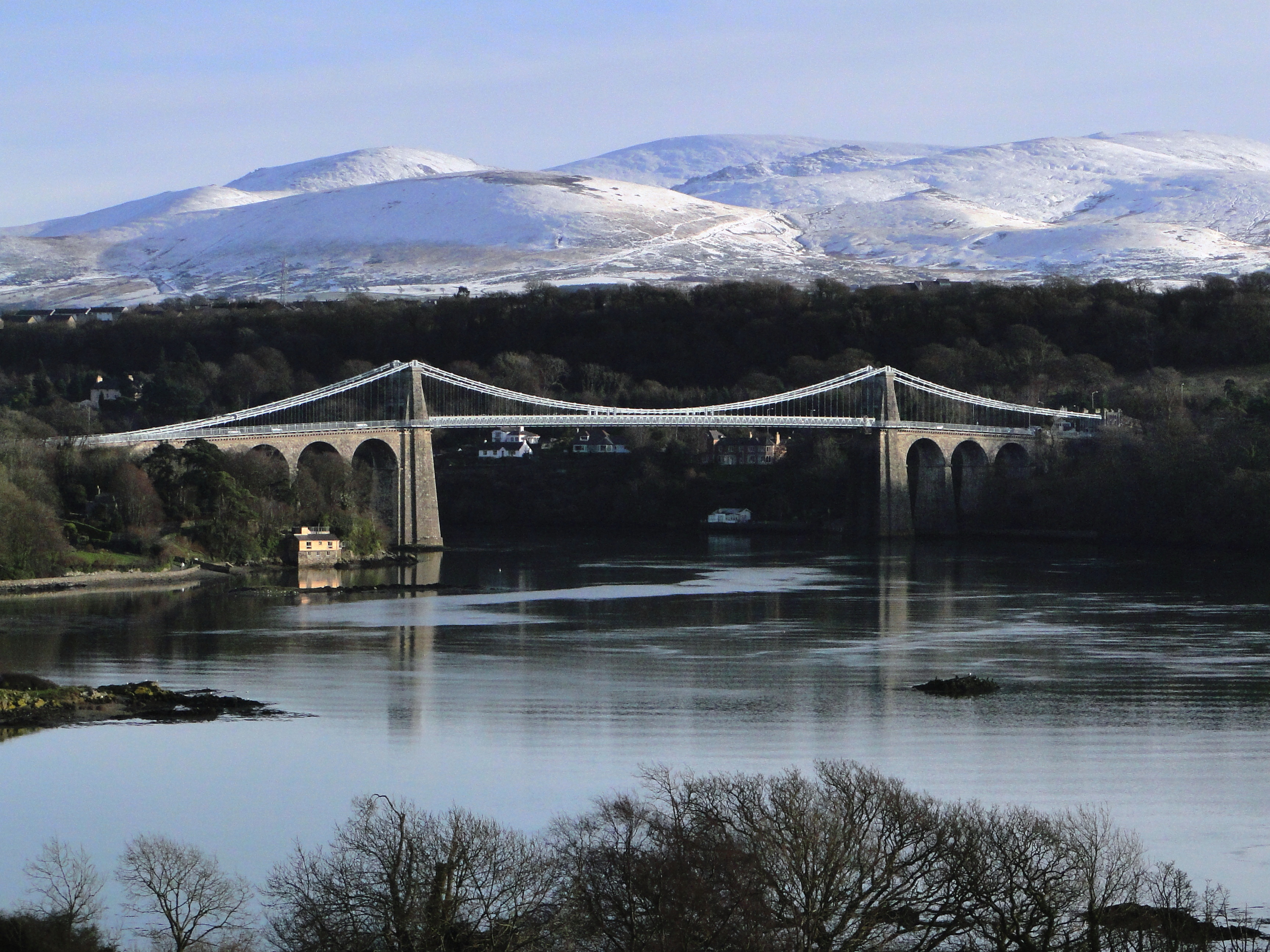
Menai Suspension Bridge

The construction of the Holyhead Road and other work by Thomas Telford resulted in a number major bridges. At Betws-y-Coed Telford constructed the early iron Waterloo Bridge across the Llugwy. This bridge with a span of over 30 metres, was cast at William Hazledine's foundry. This bridge has the inscription "This arch was constructed in the same year as the battle of Waterloo was fought", but it was completed in 1816.

Another iron bridge to be completed in 1816 was John Rennie's elegant bridge over the river Wye at Chepstow which was also produced at Hazeldine's foundry. In 1819 Thomas Penson became County Surveyor for Montgomeryshire and he built many new bridges in the county including a notable series of iron bridges over the river Severn, including those at Garthmyl at Berriew, Brynderwen at Abermule and Llandinam. The inscription of the Brynderwyn, Penson copies Telford with an inscription over the arch "This is the second iron bridge constructed in the county of Montgomery, was erected in the year 1852. Thomas Penson, County Surveyor : Brymbo Company Ironfounders".

== Labourer and peasant cottages ==
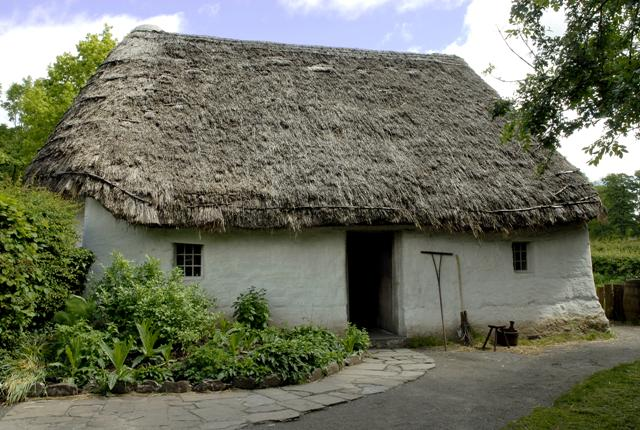
Nant Wallter Cottage St Fagans

Tŷ unnos (plural Tai unnos) (one night house), is a traditional Welsh folklore from the 17th to 19th centuries that if a person could build a house on common land in one night, the land then belonged to them as a freehold. It is said that smoke had to be coming from the chimney before dawn and in Denbighshire the builder was able to claim land within the distance they could throw an axe from the corners of the house.

== Great houses of the later Stuart period ==
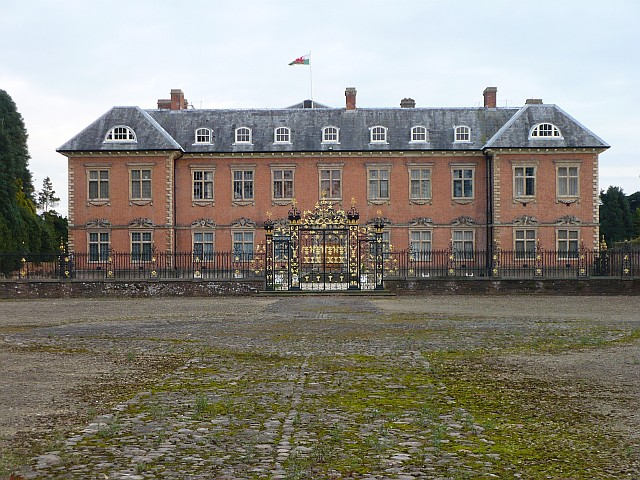
Tredegar House, Newport

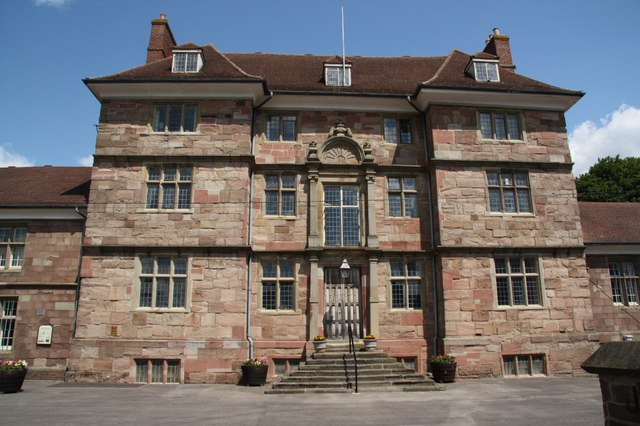
Great Castle House, Monmouth, 1673

In the Restoration period following the Civil War a number of major larger houses were built, particularly in southern Wales. The first and most impressive of these was rebuilding of Tredegar House at Newport by William Morgan in the mid-1660s. This was probably the work of two carpenter architects, Roger and William Hurlbutt from Warwick. A brick house that is richly decorated with stone dressings and the principal doorway with foliage clad twisted columns that support a pediment. Tredegar House was to be followed by Great Castle House at Monmouth in 1673 for Henry Somerset, who became the 1st Duke of Beaufort in 1682 and was also Lord President of the Marches. Another house of this period was Penpont in Breconshire built around 1666. A double-pile house It has been much altered. It was encased in Bath stone in 1828–1835, when a ground floor colonnade was added to the front of the house.

Following the construction of Castle House in Monmouth, the Duke of Beaufort had a country house, Troy House at Michels Troy built in 1681–1684, but incorporating an earlier 17th-century house.

In 1683 work was begun on the construction of Erddig, on the outskirts of Wrexham. Erddig was a similar house to Troy House. The architect was a Thomas Webb, who is described as a 'freemason".

At Trawsgoed (Crosswood) in Ceredigion the earlier house was partially rebuilt after damage during the Civil War and the house survives today in much altered form. The appearance of the house in 1684 is provided by a drawing by Thomas Dineley. There was a three bay central house with dormers and a classical doorway with earlier side wings forming an inner courtyard, and outer gated garden courtyard.

== Georgian architecture ==
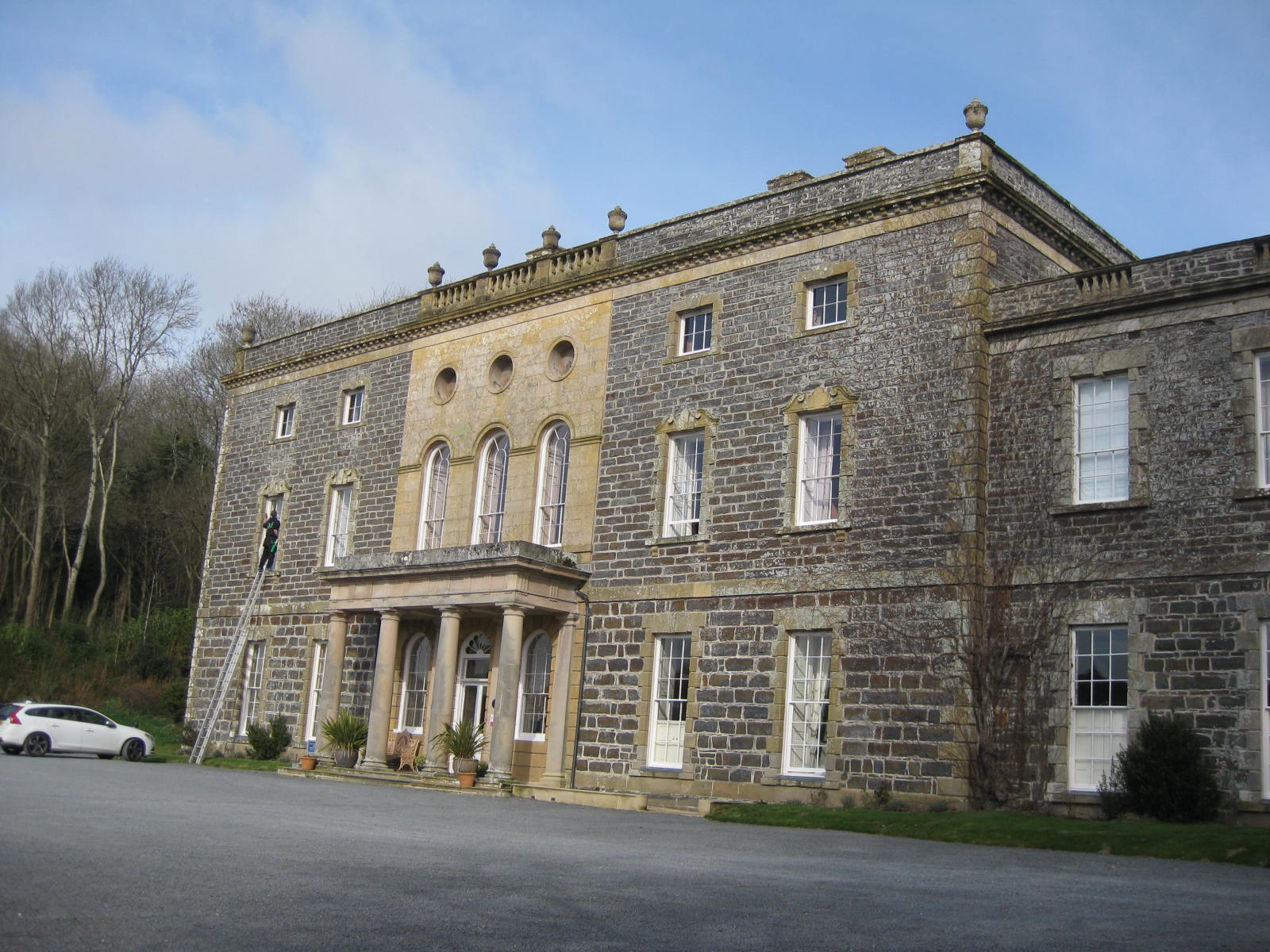
Nanteos Ceredigion

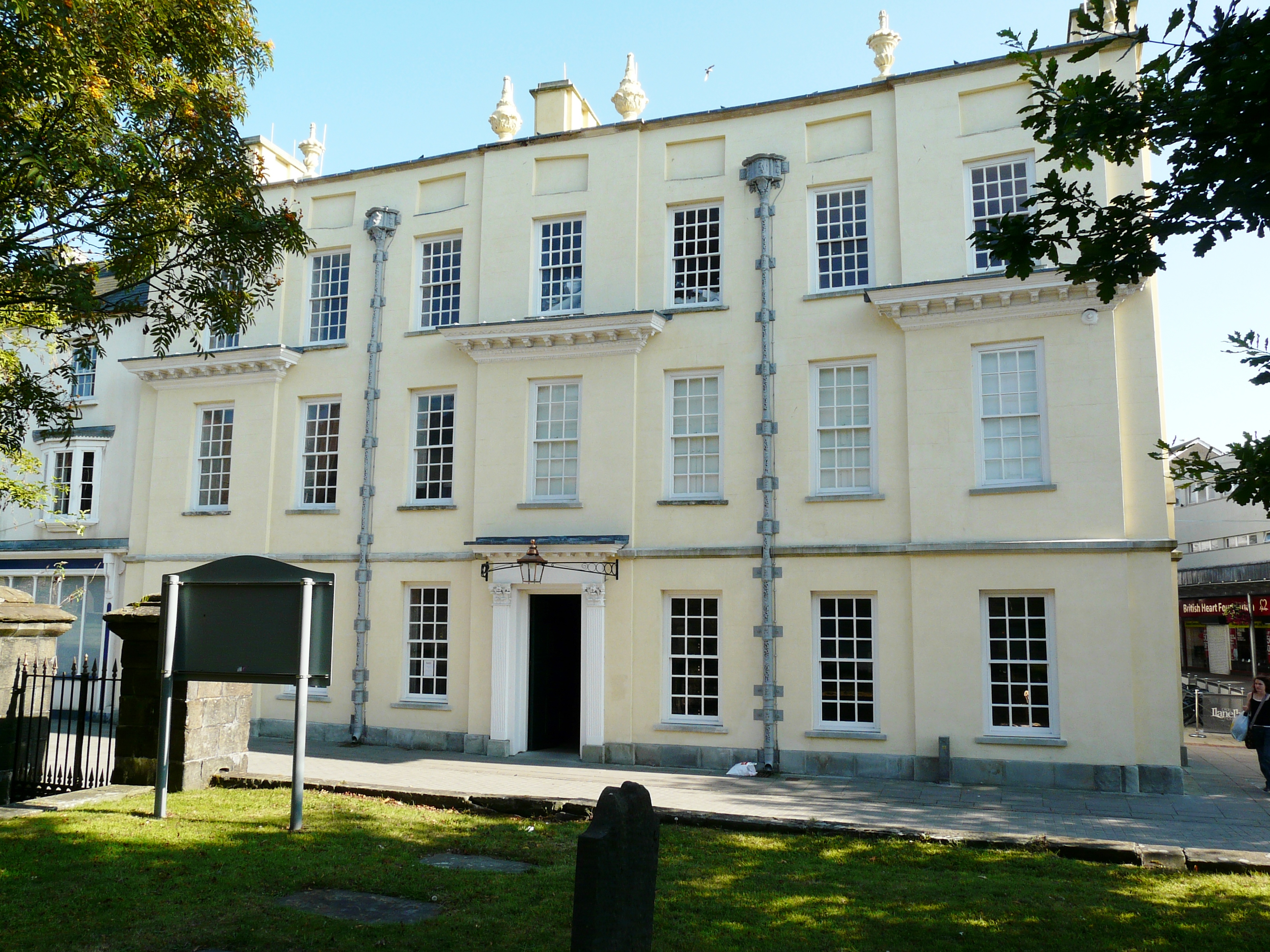
Llanelly House as restored 2014

Architecture of the Georgian period in Wales may be considered to start with houses such as the recently restored Llanelly House. This was built in 1714 by Sir Thomas Stepney in Llanelli. At the time Llanelli was only a village and this should be considered a Country House rather than a town house The House has its original lead downspouts which are dated 1714, but there is no evidence as to whom the architect was. It is of seven bays with sash windows and a parapet with big gadrooned urns. Similar large block-like houses continued to be built during the reigns of George I and George II. Nanteos near Aberystwyth has a foundation stone of 1739 and completion date on the rainwater head of 1757.

Taliaris in Carmarthenshire is another house of this form with a facade of Bath stone. It was probably built shortly after the marriage of Richard Gywnne to Ann Rudd in 1722–1723. Taliaris is by an unknown, but on stylistic grounds it has been suggested that it is the work of a Bristol or Somerset mason or architect A further example of this type of house was the early 18th-century Glanbran, Cynhordy, Carmarthenshire which is described as Palladian with Mannerist touches. There was an ornamented Venetian window and a top window with paired pilasters. It was finally demolished in 1987.

Houses with the typical Palladian arrangement of a central block attached wings or flanking pavilions were built at Dyffryn Aled in Llansannan in Denbighshire and Trawscoed at Guilsfield in Montgomeryshire. Dyffryn Alyn was built to designs by Joseph Turner in 1777, and the pavilions were added in a matching design by James Wolfe. Thomas Pennant records that the house replaced an old house of the Wynne family and Dianna Wynne built a new house "in a most elegant and magnificent manner, on the side of the hill opposite the antient mansion" and cased it in Bath stone. "The very day after the workmen had finished their work, almost the whole casing fell down: which occasioned a vast expense in the repair." The house was demolished around 1920, but Pennant provided a picture of this grand house in his extra-illustrated volumes of the tour, now in the National Library of Wales

A development of the Palladian style was Pengwern Place (or Hall) near Rhuddlan of 1778. This was a Mostyn family house and today is much altered from its original appearance, which is shown in its original form in an engraving in Neale's Seats of 1818. The main block is of two and a half storeys and five bays with octagonal wings in brick with stone dressings. The central pediment over three bays on a giant order of Ionic pilasters. On either side at first floor level are two Venetian Windows. An impressive composition which is already starting to show the influence of Robert Adam

An important architect who established himself at Swansea in this period was William Jernegan (c. 1751 – 1836). He probably came to Wales as an assistant to John Johnson, in the 1770s. He was to design a number of Regency terraces in Swansea which have now largely disappeared, the Assembly Rooms of 1810 and produced plans for the Swansea Copper works. In the area around Swansea he was responsible for the Marino, which was incorporated into Singleton Abbey, the re-modelled Kilvrough in c. 1785, Stouthall, Reynollston, 1787–9, and Sketty Hall and Sketty Park House. He was responsible for the Mumbles Lighthouse in 1793. He is also thought to have been involved in the design and layout of Milford Haven in Pembrokeshire.

=== Prisons and workhouses ===
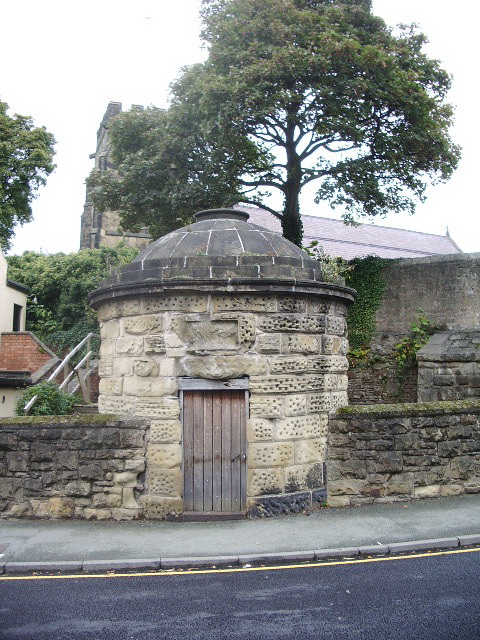
The Roundhouse (village lock-up), Ruabon

In the latter part of the 18th century, as the result of Prison reform new prisons came to be built in most of the Welsh County towns. The reforms were the result of the work of John Howard, who in 1777 published The State of the Prisons He proposed that each prisoner should be in a separate cell with separate sections for women felons, men felons, young offenders and debtors. This was followed by the Penitentiary Act which was passed in 1779. This act was in implemented in each Welsh county by the Court of Great Sessions and which led to the building of many new prisons across Wales. These included the jails built in Carmarthen and Cardigan by John Nash and the jails at Caernarfon (1793), Ruthin (1785) and Flint (1775) by Joseph Turner. Most of these prisons were closed in the 1870s, but the Ruthin jail, now used as the Denbighshire County Record Office is remarkably well preserved. The Anglesey Gaol at Beaumaris came later in 1828–1829 by the architects Hansom and Welch. This incorporates many of the innovations of the Milbank Penitentiary in London of 1812–1821 with wings, a massive curtilage wall and a central glass cupola for the oversight of the prison complex.

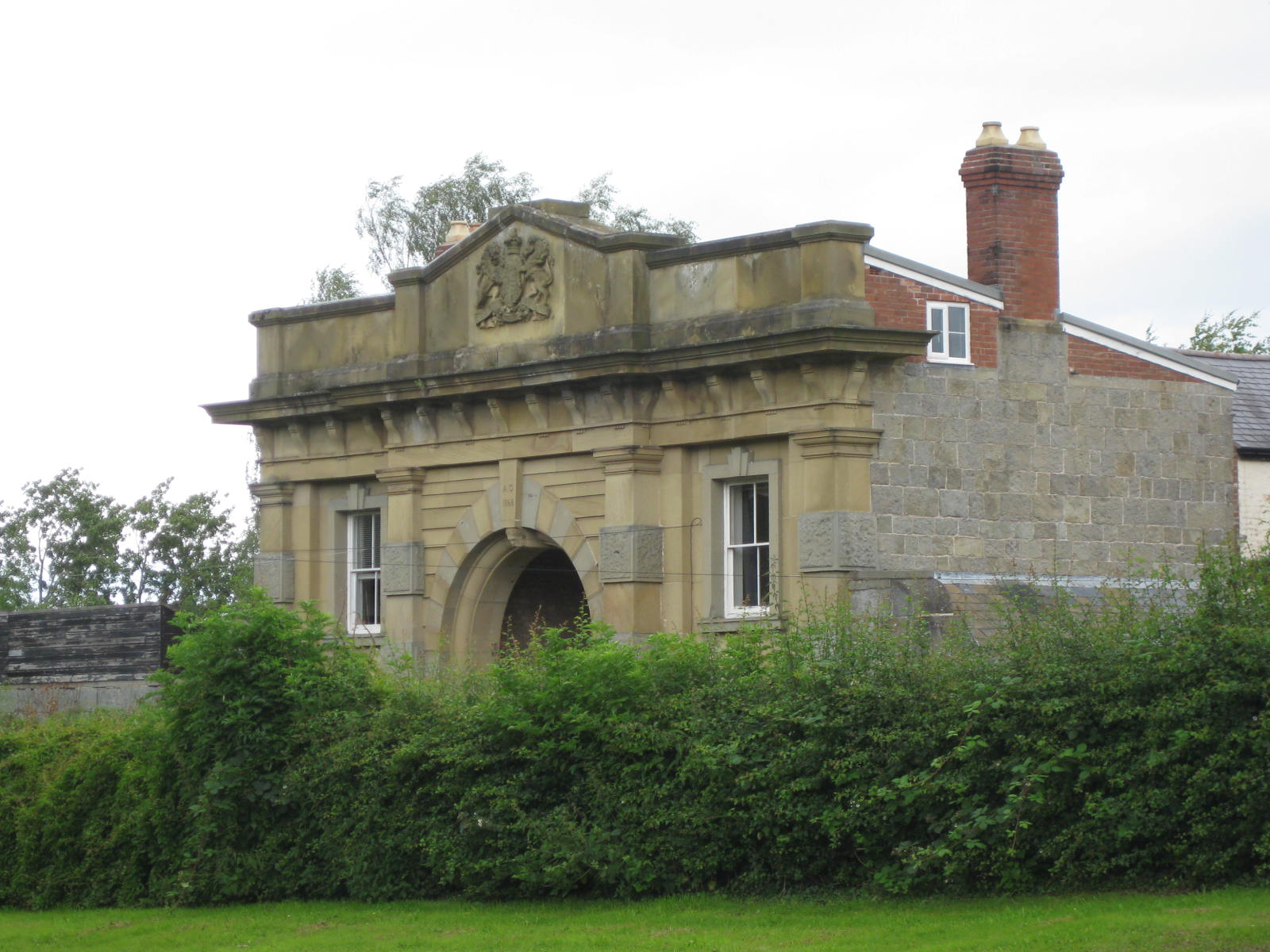
Montgomery Gaol Gateway

This plan was developed for the Montgomeryshire County jail at Montgomery by the County Surveyor Thomas Penson, c. 1830–32. Brick faced with stone. The tall octagonal governor's house with the chapel above, was at the centre of four radiating three- and two-storey wings. One of the yards was fitted with a tread-mill. The gatehouse was built into the wall to face a new approach in 1866 by J.W. Poundley. Powerful ashlar triumphal arch, with four giant semi-rusticated pilasters. The Gaol was closed in 1878 and all that now remains, apart from the gatehouse, is the Governor's House and the high wall of one cell block.

== Neoclassicism and Greek revival architecture ==
=== North Wales ===
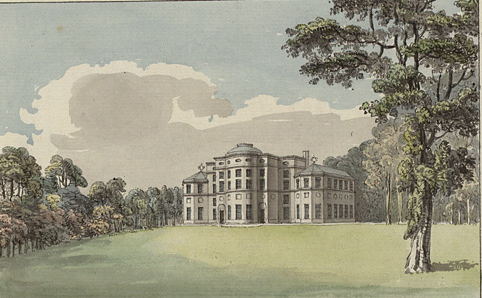
Baron Hill, Beaumaris by Samuel Wyatt 1776-9

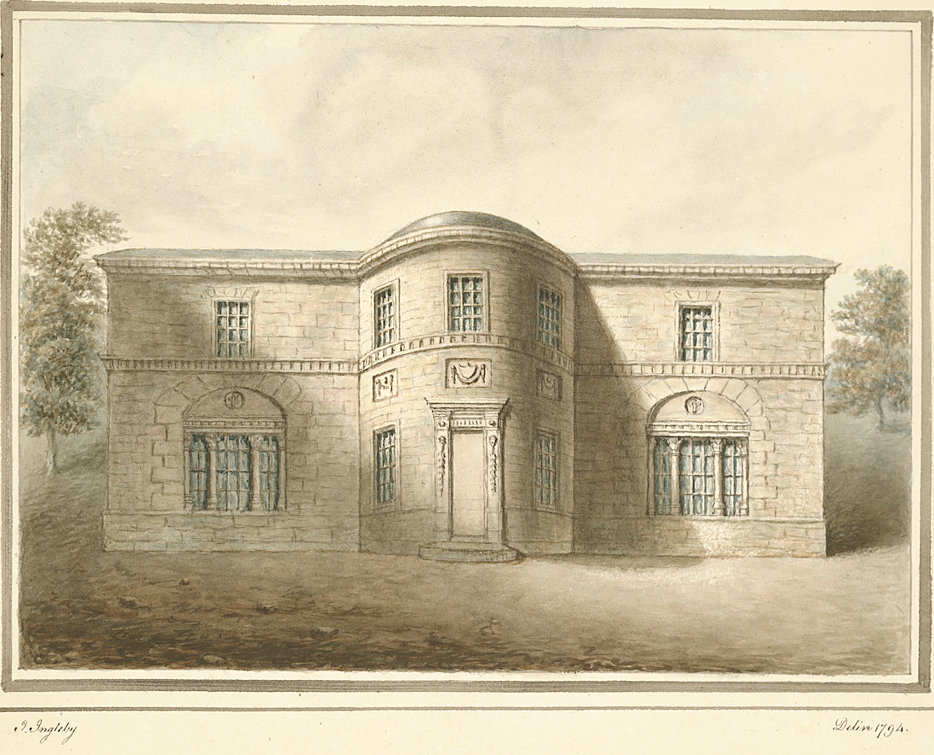
Kinmel Park, St Asaph, watercolour by John Ingleby 1794

Neoclassical architecture came to north Wales mainly as a result of the influence of Samuel Wyatt. Wyatt had worked for Robert Adam, the leading Neoclassical architect when he became the clerk of Works at Kedleston Hall in 1759. Between 1776 and 1779 he remodelled Baron Hill at Beaumaris on Anglesey for Viscount Bulkely, while his brother became estate manager for the Pennants at Penrhyn. Howard Colvin remarks that Wyatt specialised in the designing of medium-sized country houses in an elegant and restrained neo-classical manner. Characteristic features of his houses were astylar elevations with prominent bowed projections which were domed and were either single or in pairs. His windows were often tripartite and overarched. He rarely deviated from the neo-classical, though he did a gothic revival building at Penrhyn Castle which was replaced by Hopper's Neo-Romanesque Castle. At Kinmel Park near St Asaph, around 1790, he built a stylish house for the Rev Edward Hughes, who derived great wealth from the development of the Parys Copper mines on Anglesey. This house had a bowed front and panels with classical swags, possibly of Coade stone. It was burnt down in 1841, but fortunately it was recorded in a watercolour by John Ingleby in 1794. A further house in this style was the Old Bishop's Palace in St Asaph which was probably by Samuel Wyatt, while at Brynbella in Tremeirchion a London surveyor, Clement Mead built Brynbella, for Dr Johnson's friend Mrs Thrale. Bryn Bella was built between 1792 and 1795 with an ashlar facade and double bays and wings with pediments on either side.

=== South Wales ===
In south Wales Neo-classicism was introduced by the Gloucestershire architect Anthony Keck and by William Jernegan, an architect who established a practice at Swansea. Keck who worked from Kings Stanley Gloucestershire may have worked with Sir Robert Taylor who would have introduced him to clients in Wales. He built a bow fronted house for Thomas Mansel Talbot (1747–1813) adjacent to Penrice Castle in Glamorgan in 1773–1780. This building, though earlier than Samuel Wyatt's work in north Wales, lacks features such as the overarched windows. However, the Orangery he also built for Thomas Mansel Talbot at Margam Abbey from 1787 to 1790, exhibits a much more refined appreciation of Neo-classicism and may well be considered the best example of this architectural style in Wales. It is the largest Orangery in the British Isles of 17 continuous bays with vermiculated rustication to the more formal swags and arched windows.

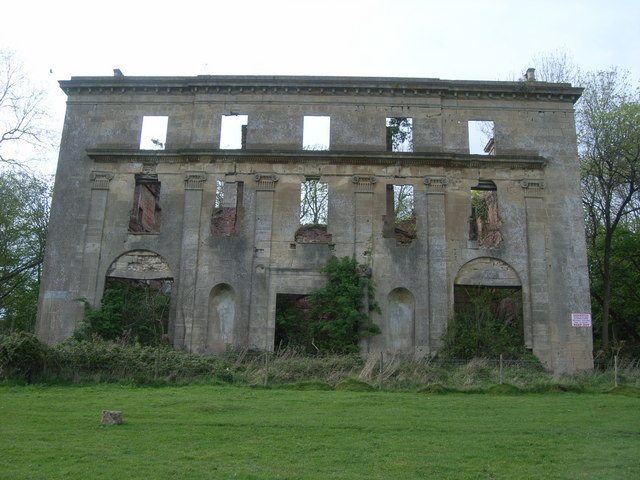
The ruined Piercefield House, Monmouthshire

A house of considerable importance was Piercefield between Chepstow and St Arvans. Originally known for its gardens laid out by Valentine Morris, it was rebuilt in 1793 to plans prepared by Sir John Soane which were to be modified by Joseph Bonomi. It still retained a Palladian appearance with a massive central block and side pavilions. The side pavilions and curved colonnade of Tuscan columns were the additions made by Bononi after 1795. The house to-day is in a ruinous state.

=== Greek revival architecture ===
A house which bridged the gap between late Palladian forms and Neo-classism was Middleton Hall in Carmarthenshire, built for Sir William Paxton to the designs of S p. Cockerell between 1793 and 1795. The giant portico supported by five Ionic Columns was a theme which was to prove popular with architects working in Wales in the following century. The over-arched windows are Palladian derived and were used by Sir Robert Taylor for Carmarthen Town Hall. Cockerell had served his pupillage under Sir Robert Taylor, as had also John Nash and these windows are also seen on Nash's Villa type houses in Wales, as at Llanerchaeron. Middleton Hall was burnt down in 1931, and its gardens, are now the site of the National Botanic Garden of Wales. Cockerell was also responsible for the design of the nearby Paxton's Tower, a Gothic folly built in 1805 in commemoration of Lord Nelson. 1n 1810 Cockerell was responsible to Sir William Paxton for building the sea water Baths and Assembly Rooms at Tenby. Over the enclosed bow porch is a Greek inscription taken from Euripides "The sea washes away all the ills of men."

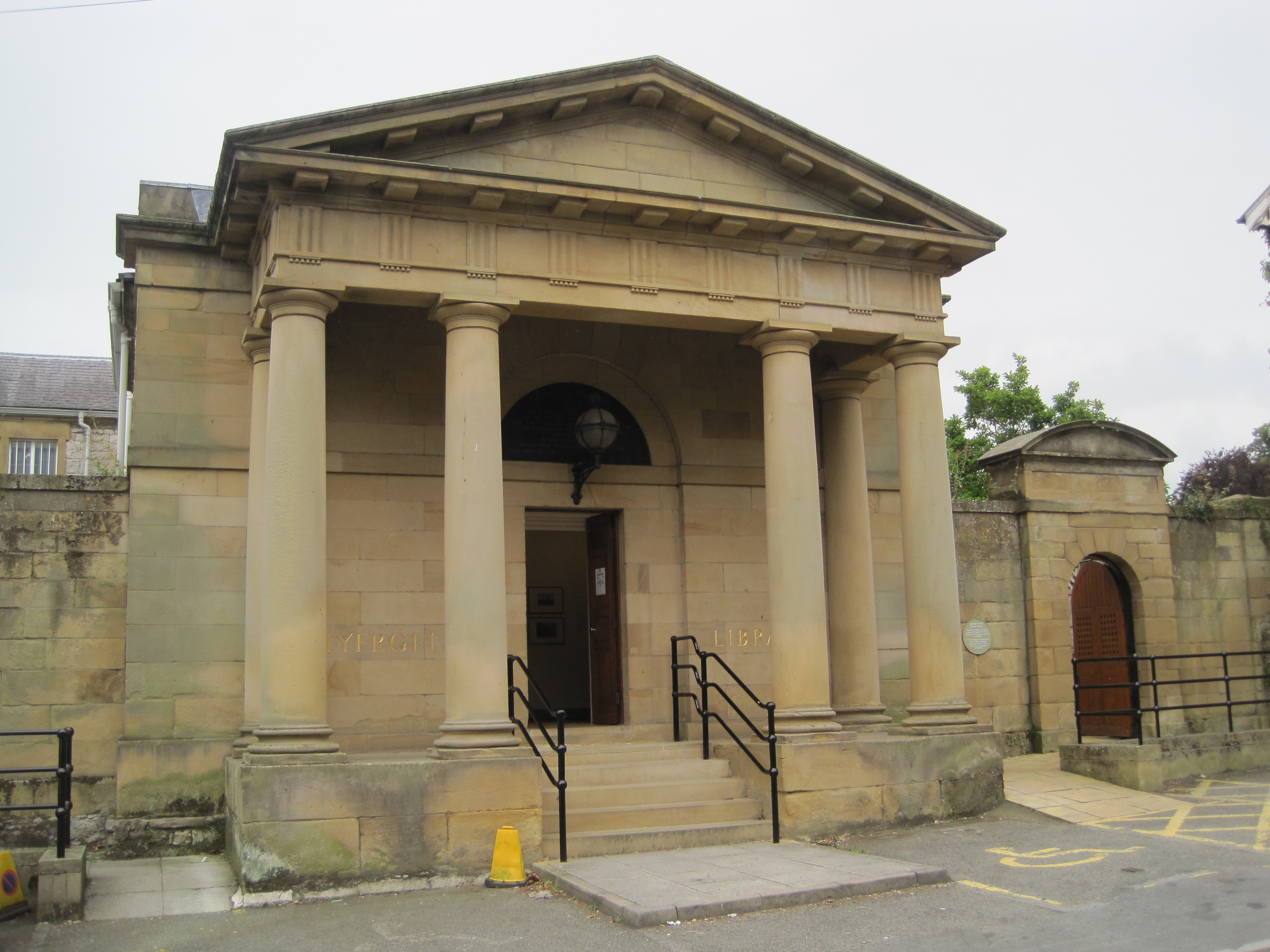
Court House in Ruthin by Joseph Turner 1785–90

A Chester architect showing considerable competence in classical revival architecture was Joseph Turner who worked extensively in Flintshire and Denbighshire. Apart Ruthin and Flint jails, he was responsible for the County Hall at Ruthin, which served as a courthouse. It has an ashlar facade with a tetrastyle pedimented portico with Greek Doric capitals and the courtroom has Venetian windows on either side The use Greek revival Ionic Columns under a tetrastyle portico occurs again at Llanphey Court in Pembrokeshire which was completed in 1823 by Charles Fowler who was also the architect for the Covent Garden Market in London.

An architect who worked very competently in the Classical style was George Vaughan Maddox (1802–1864), a Monmouth architect whose work is restricted to Monmouth and the area immediately around. Maddox has been noted above as the architect for New Market in Monmouth which opened in 1837. This was part of a new street which was built on arches overlooking the river Monnow, which now forms a handsome entrance to the town from the North.

=== Developed Classicism ===
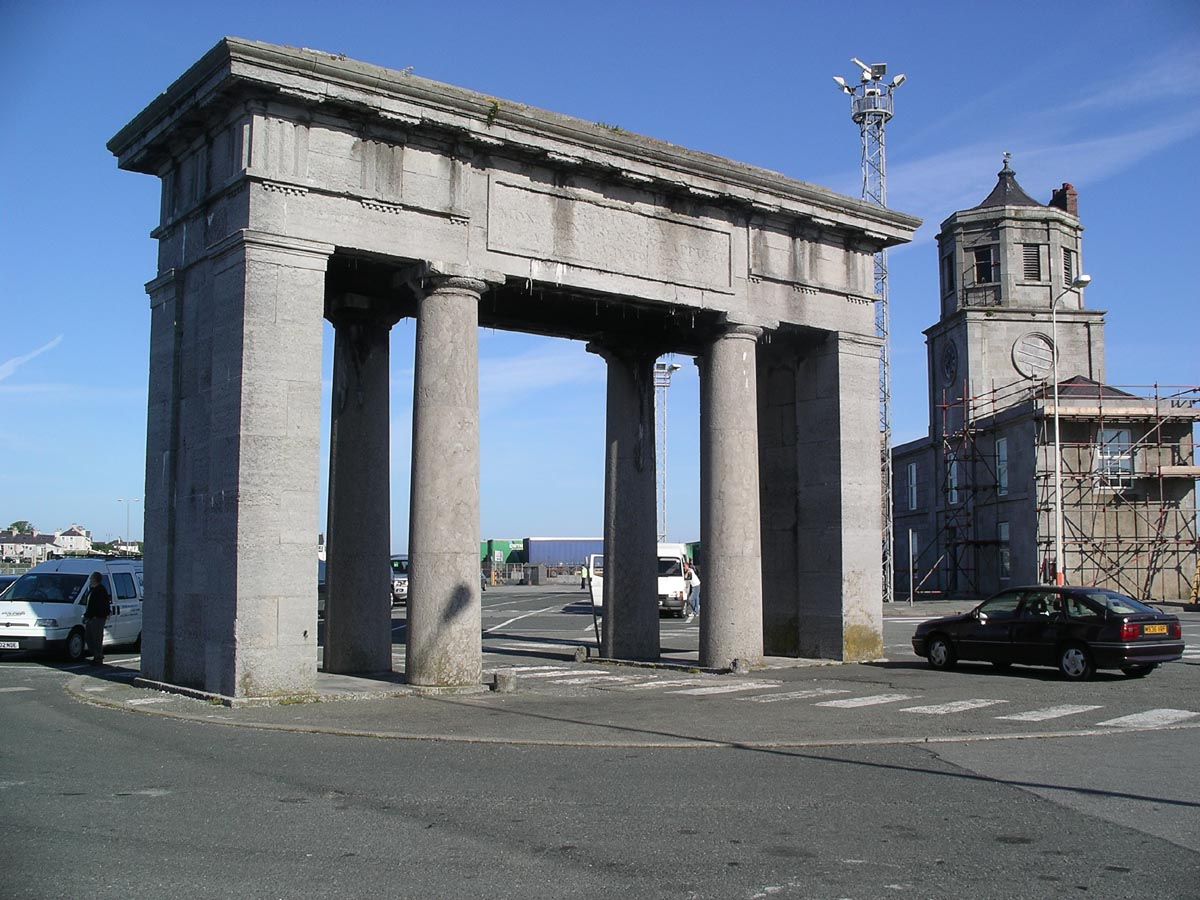
Admiralty arch Holyhead

This is comparatively well represented in Wales. As a style it is more severe and modeled more closely on Greek Architecture. Thomas Harrison of Chester was a leading exponent of the style and in Anglesey was responsible for the Holyhead Memorial and the Marquess of Anglesey's Column in Llanfairpwll on Anglesey in 1816–1817, to commemorate the feats of Marquess of Anglesey in the Napoleonic Wars.

Harpton Court, near New Radnor is a further example of a house remodelled in a Classical revival style around 1840. It was built in 1750 for the Lewis family and was later modified by John Nash. It was then remodelled on the south front by an unknown architect in stone with nine bays, with the three central bays broken forward with pilasters and surmounted with a pediment. The house was sold in 1953 and partially demolished in 1956.

=== Public buildings ===
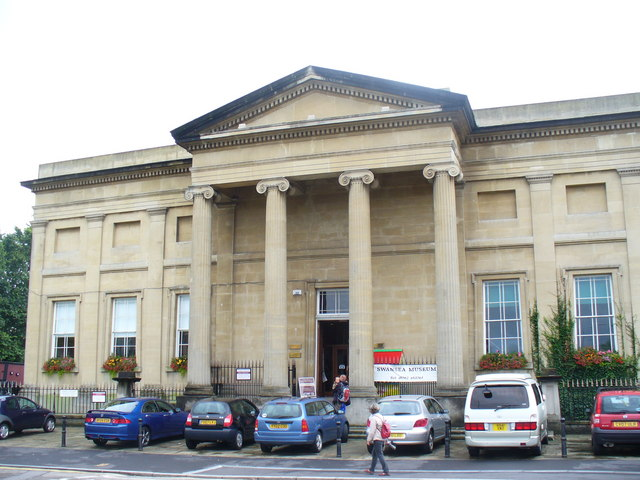
Swansea Museum

The Greek revival style was chosen for many public buildings in Wales. Swansea Museum of 1839–1841, originally the Royal Institution of South Wales is a finely detailed and well balanced example with a three bay portico supported on Ionic columns. It is faced in Bath ashlar stone. It was built to designs by Frederick Long, a Liverpool architect.

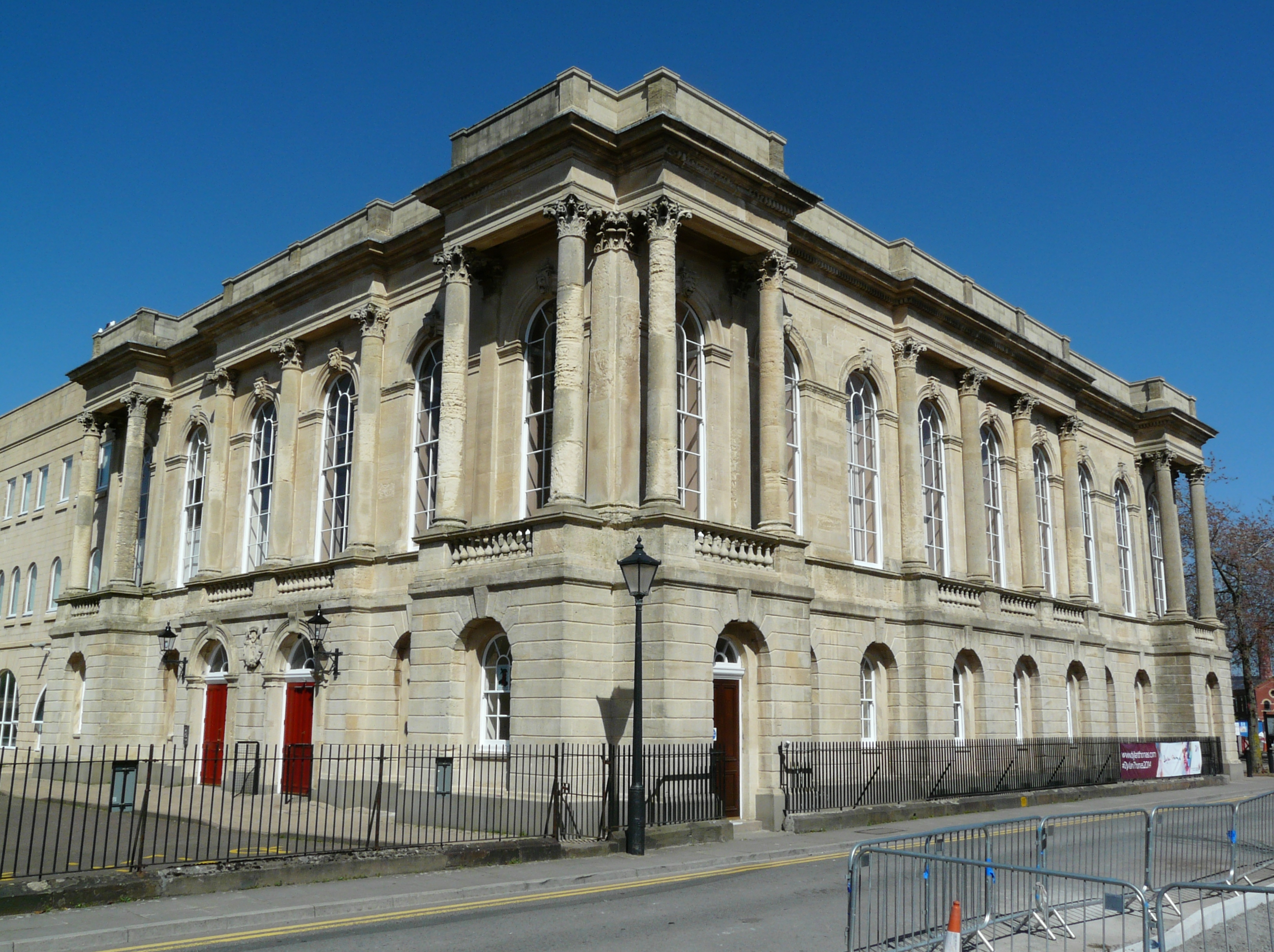
Swansea Old Town Hall

A rather later use of Greek revival is the Shire Hall at Caernarfon of almost oversized proportions and facing Caernarfon Castle. It was built 1867–1869 by the County Surveyor, John Thomas. It is of seven bays with a central doric portico with a pediment surmounted with the blindfold figure of justice Other work in the Greek Revival style in Wales includes Brecon Shire Hall (now Brecon Museum) by Thomas Henry Wyatt and Bridgend Town Hall by David Vaughan. Bridgend Town, a tragic loss, demolished as recently as 1971, was built in the style of a Greek temple with Doric columns supporting the portico in antis.

An early and unusual combination of Grecian and Italianate architecture is Swansea Old Town Hall. It is described by Newman as "the noblest classical building in Swansea ......a grandiose Corinthian Palazzo." It was built to designs by Thomas Taylor of London between 1848 and 1852 which incorporated the earlier Town Hall of 1825– 27 by Thomas Bowen. The interior of the building, which is now the Dylan Thomas Centre, was extensively rebuilt in 1993–1994

== Gothic Revivalism and Historicism of the 18th and 19th Centuries. ==
=== Romanesque or Norman revival architecture ===
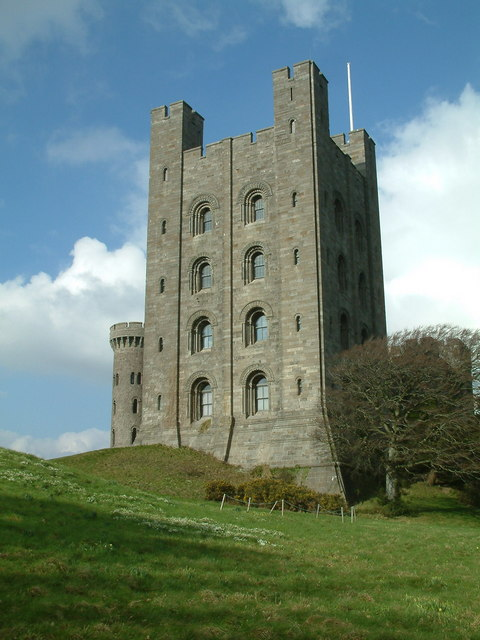
Penrhyn Castle

The derivation of Romanesque Revival architecture or Norman Revival architecture can be traced back to the late 17th century, but only became a recognisable architectural style around 1820. In 1817 Thomas Rickman published his An Attempt to Discriminate the Styles of English Architecture from the Conquest To the Reformation. It was now realised that "round-arch architecture" was largely Romanesque in the British Isles and came to be described as Norman rather than Saxon. The start of an "archaeologically correct" Norman Revival can be recognised in the architecture of Thomas Hopper. His first attempt at this style was at Gosford Castle in Armagh in Ireland, but far more successful was his Penrhyn Castle near Bangor. This was built for the Pennant family, between 1820 and 1837. The style did not catch on for domestic buildings, though many country houses and mock castles were built in the Castle Gothic or Castellated style during the Victorian period, which was a mixed Gothic style.

=== Strawberry Hill and the earlier Gothic Revival ===
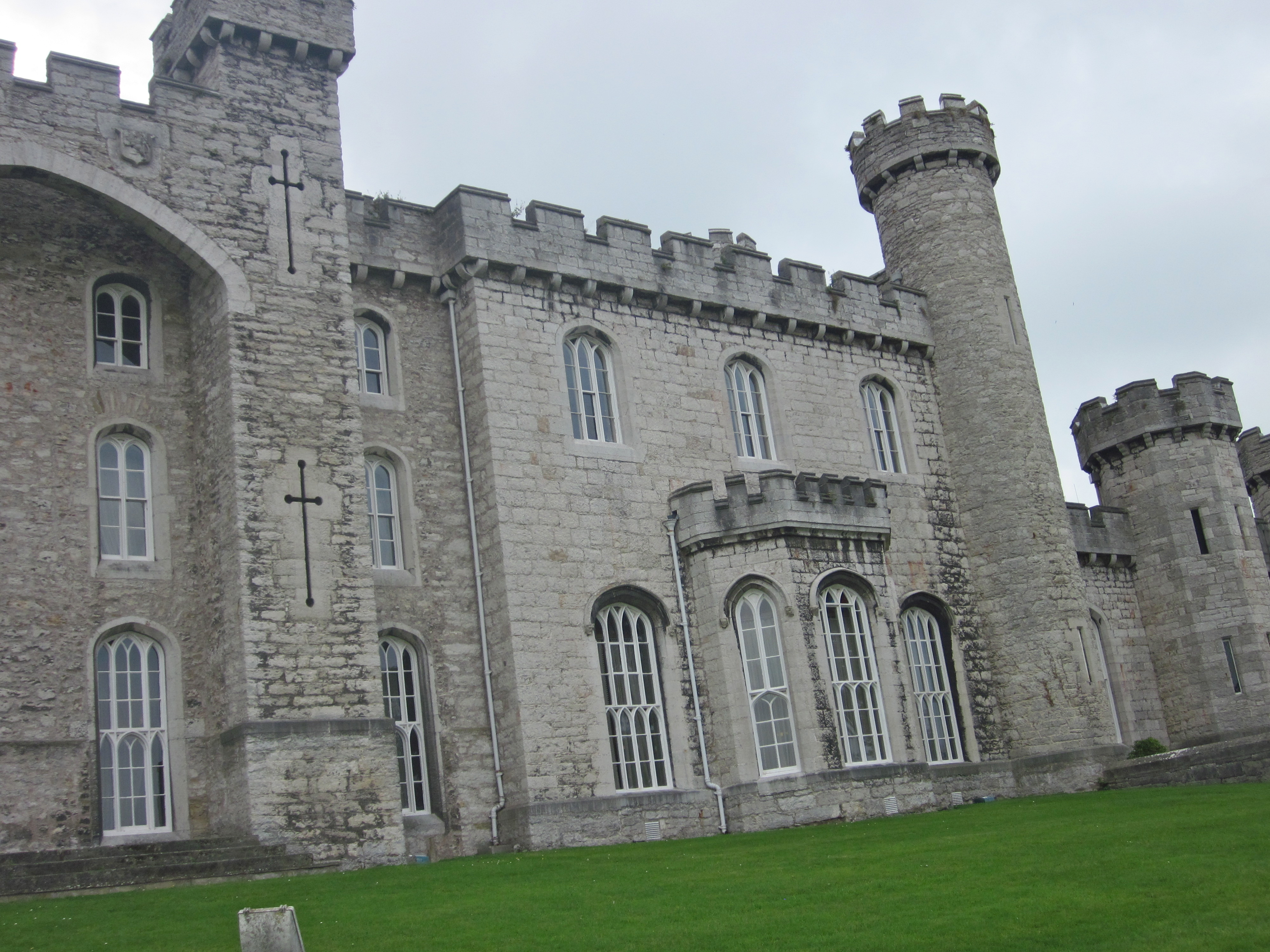
Bodelwyddan Castle Central Gothic extension 1802-8

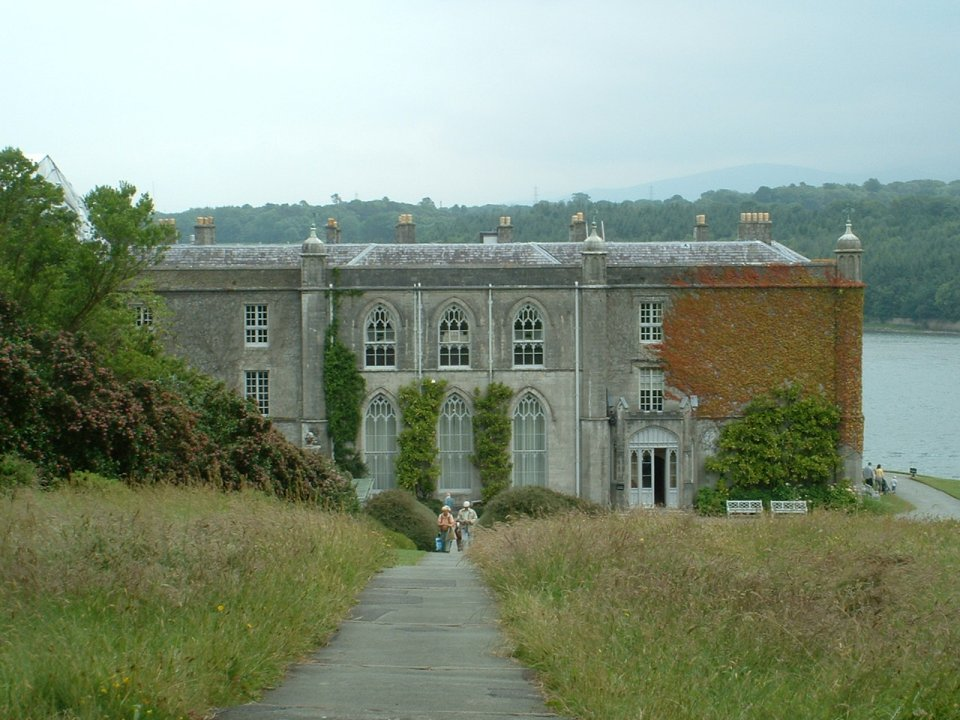
Plas Newydd

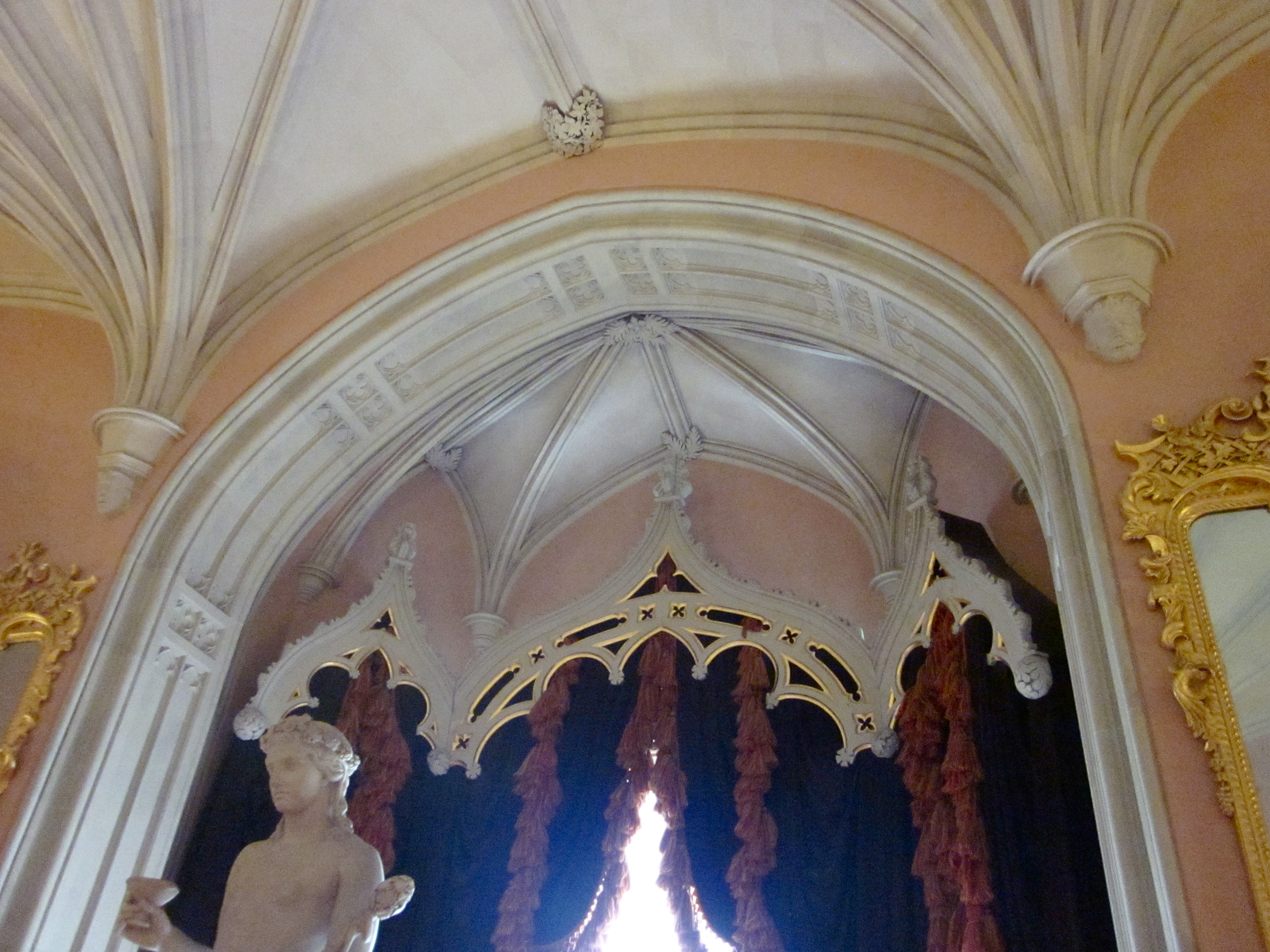
Bodelwyddan Castle Gothic window alcove at Boddelwddan 1802-8

A surprisingly early example of Gothic Revival architecture in Wales is the south wing of Hensol Castle in Glamorgan. Hensol had three storied east and west wings added with tower-like semi-octagonal bays which were fenestrated with pointed gothic windows and surmounted by battlements. It has been suggested that this very early Gothic architecture was the work of Roger Morris who also designed Clearwell Castle in Gloucestershire about 1728.

Another example of the simple Gothic revival style was Gnoll near Neath. This was a remodelling, starting in 1776, of an existing house for Sir Herbert Mackworth, owner of a local copper works. It had a crenulated parapet and round towers at the two corners of the frontage. The architect was John Johnson an Essex architect who had been associated with Mackworth's banking interests in London. Following this, examples of Strawberry Hill Gothic start appearing in Wales, the most significant of which was Hafod. The first stage of Hafod was started 1786 by Thomas Baldwin of Bath for Thomas Johnes, in a Gothic revival style with gothic window, battlements and pinnacles and then in 1793–1794 John Nash added a top-lit galleried library and a 300 ft long conservatory.

Another early pioneer of the Gothic style was James Wyatt who was employed by the Earl of Uxbridge to build Beaudesert in Staffordshire in the Gothic style in 1771–1772. The Earl was to employ him again at Plas Newydd on Anglesey to rebuild the West front and the interior in a Gothic style from 1793 to 1799 Wyatt worked with the Lichfield architect James Potter and the style of plasterwork lacks the lightness of Strawberry Hill gothic. Plas Newydd was followed by the more remarkable Gothic mansion at Garth at Guilsfield in Montgomeryshire, built for Devereux Mytton, probably in the late 1790s.

Another house with Strawberry Hill Gothic features was Bodelwyddan Castle which had a Gothic wing and gothic interior added between 1802 and 1808 by an unknown architect. During this period a number of other houses in Wales were given Gothic facades with arched pointed windows, such as Llewenni in Denbighshire. At Hawarden Castle the Palladian house, on a different site to the medieval castle, was transformed by Thomas Cundy in 1809–1810 for Sir Stephen Richard Glynne. It was refronted and machicolations, towers and turrets were added. A west wing was added with gothic windows. At Rhiwlas, near Bala the ancient house was re-cased as a Gothic castle in 1809 with three storeys and three polygonal towers, but the house was largely replaced by new house in 1954. The Gate arch by Thomas Rickman of 1813 still exists.

=== Folly Gothic ===
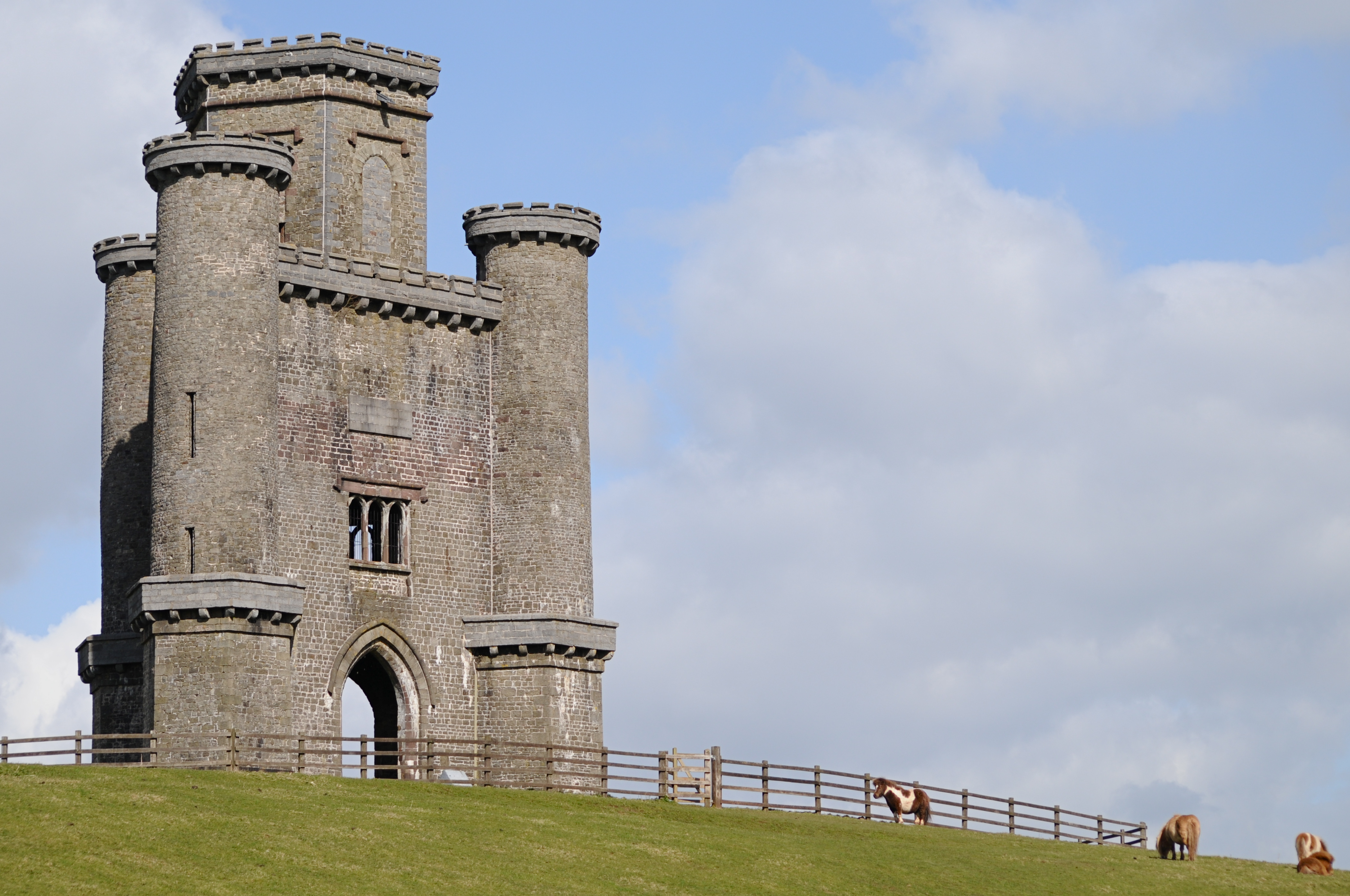
PaxtonsTower

In the 1780s there was another style evolving which sometimes is referred to as a 'Folly Gothic', houses which were intended as eye-catchers. Possibly the best example of this is Clytha Castle the work of architect and garden designer John Davenport. This style was a less archaeologically correct form of Gothic revival and was widely used in Wales during the period 1780 to about 1810. Greater emphasis was placed on prominent arrow slits in round towers, blanked quatrefoil windows and stepped and angled battlements on gables. The earliest example of this may be the re-building of Penrhyn Castle, sometime before 1782 by Samuel Wyatt for Richard Pennant, who was to develop the Bethesda slate quarries. This building is only known from drawings by Moses Griffiths, though parts of it were incorporated into Thomas Hopper's rebuilding of Penrhyn. While it shows the features of this evolving style, the doorway shows the influence of Strawberry Hill gothic. Folly Gothic was a style which was widely adopted for park gates and lodges and for small houses sited in picturesque positions in locations frequented by tourists. A good example is Ogwen Bank near Bethesda, built by Lord Penhryn, possibly to a design by Samuel Wyatt, for visitors to the Ogwen falls. In the Montgomeryshire at Berriew Bodheilin was built in a prominent position overlooking the valley of the river Severn. This was burnt down in 1906, but an engraving shows a fantastic villa with five towers fronted with a Neoclassical portico.

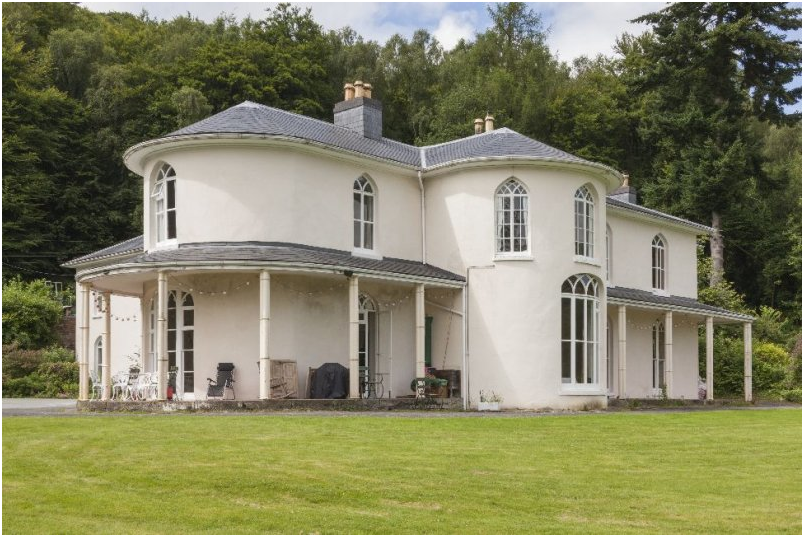
Dol-Llys, Llanidloes

In Wales pointed Gothic windows continued to be widely used until about 1810. In Montgomeryshire iron framed Gothic windows were used to embellish vernacular houses. Grander houses such as Dol-Llys in Llanidloes, built for George Mears around 1800, by an unknown architect, but in the "villa" style of John Nash, had wooden Gothic windows. One of the most eye-catching gothic follies in Wales is Paxton's Tower. Built by Sir William Paxton (1745–1824), Paxton made his first fortune while with the HEIC in Calcutta with Charles Cockerell, brother of the architect. He purchased the Middleton Hall estate about 1790 and built this tower 1808.

=== Castellated Gothic ===
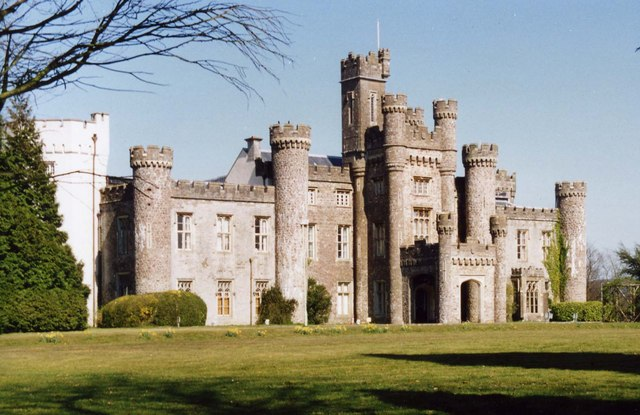
Hensol Castle

Castellated Gothic was a style that emerged in Wales following the Napoleonic Wars and has been little studied, although a considerable number of Country Houses were built in this style up to about 1870. It is largely derived from the earlier Castellated Gothic Mansions built Robert Adam in Scotland and Adam was also the designer of one house built in Wales, Wenvoe Castle in Glamorgan in 1776–7 of which only one wing of the building now survives. This "Welsh" style of Castellated Gothic lacks the historical precision of detailing seen in Strawberry Hill Gothic, but it has borrowed the turrets and battlements some Medieval Castles in Wales such as Raglan and the earlier Cardiff Castle. In some cases medieval castles which were still inhabited were by re-built in this style. Powis Castle on the outskirts of Welshpool was extensively re-built with new windows and battlements in the castellatted gothic style by Sir Robert Smirke between 1815 and 1818.

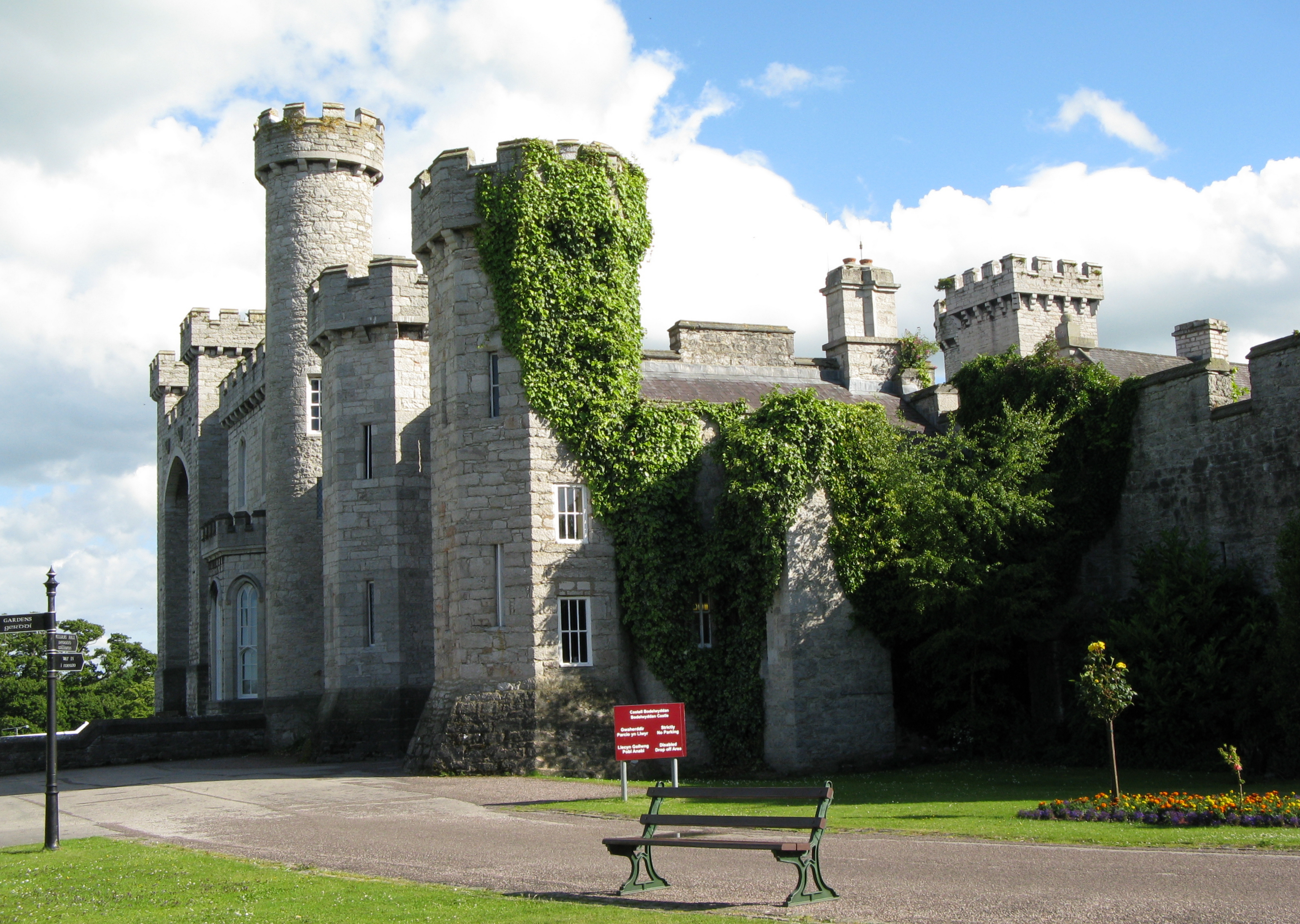
Bodelwyddan Castle, Denbighshire

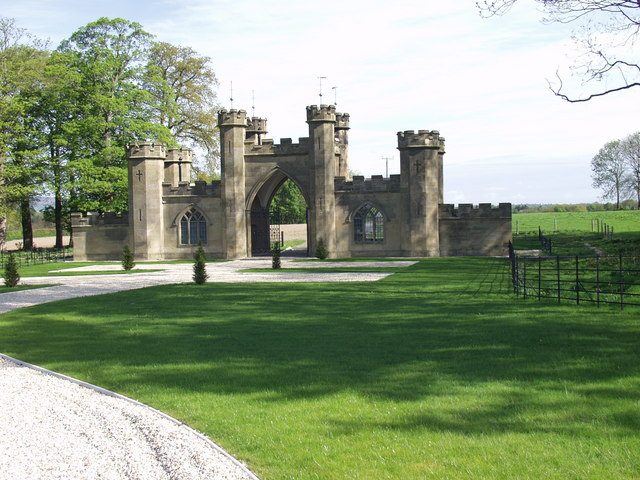
Gatehouse to Brynkinalt by Joseph Bromfield

Initially older houses such as Bodelwyddan in Denbighshire or Hensol Castle had large extensions added to them. At Stanage Park in Radnorshire the design has been attributed to John Adey Repton, but he employed as the building contractor John Hiram Haycock. Haycock, from Shrewsbury, was equally competent as an architect and may have contributed to appearance of the building. This has led Thomas Lloyd to suggest that the similar appearance of Glandyfi (c. 1812) in Ceredigion, may also be the work of Haycock. At Brynkinalt in Denbighshire the addition of castellated towers and other feature (now removed) on a late 17th-century house was the work of another Shrewsbury architect Joseph Bromfield.

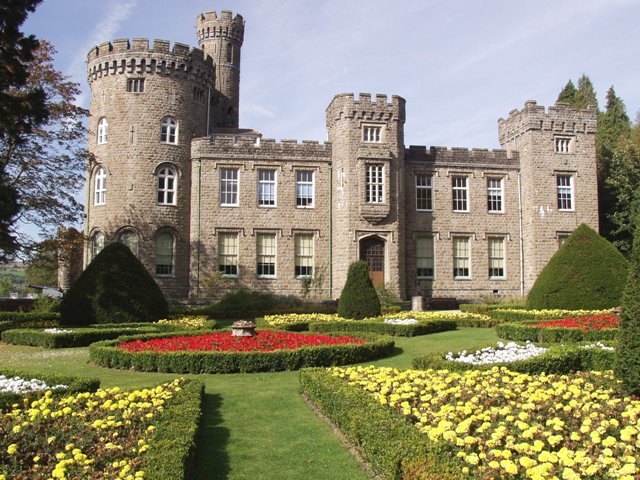
Cyfartha Castle

Castellated Gothic was the style employed by Robert Lugar when he built Cyfarthfa Castle in Merthyr Tydfil for the iron master William Crawshay, in 1824–1825. It is two-storied and battlemented with a turreted entrance porch which leads into a Gothic entrance hall with ribbed ceiling. Robert Luger was also employed at Maesllwch, Glasbury from 1829 to 1850. The main portion of this house was demolished in 1951 leaving the eastern tower, service wing and later tower. Between 1818 and 1830 John Preston Neale published his Views of the Seats of Noblemen and Gentlemen in England, Wales, Scotland and Ireland in which he included several examples of Castellated houses in Wales, showing this had become an established style. Further prints of Welsh castellated mansions were included in the Rev Francis Orpen Morris's The County Seats of the Noblemen and Gentlemen of Great Britain and Ireland which was published in six volumes of coloured lithographs in 1870; and also in the engravings in Thomas Nicholas' Annals and antiquities of the counties and county families of Wales; containing a record of all ranks of the gentry ... with many ancient pedigrees and memorials of old and extinct families published in two volumes by Longmans in 1872. These volumes give the impression that both the established gentry and the Nouveau riche bankers and industrialists in Wales needed to justify a legitimacy for building in this style and the expenditure they were lavishing on them.

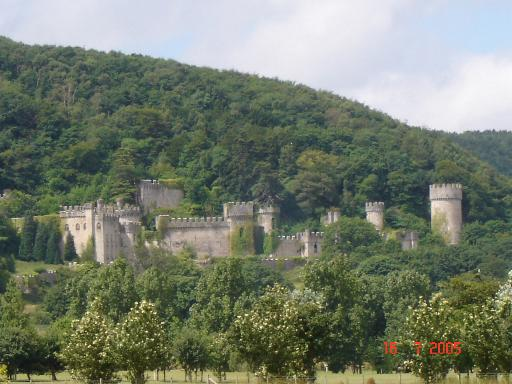
Gwrych Castle, Flintshire

Other early castellated buildings in Wales were Gwrych Castle in Flintshire. "One of the most amazing of 19th Century castellated mansions". It was designed by C A Busby and Thomas Rickman. The foundation stone was laid in 1819 and the work was probably finished in 1822. Also in Flintshire, Gyrn Castle, at Llanasa, an older house was converted into a castellated mansion for the Holywell cotton manufacturer John Douglas between 1817 and 1824. Nearby Halkyn Castle was designed by John Buckler c. 1827 for the second Earl Grosvenor. At Stanage Park, Knighton. The house was started in 1807 to designs by John Adey Repton. The arch to the stable block is dated 1807. The bay window was added in 1833 and in 1841 the Edward Haycock took over as architect, remodelling the interior after a fire and adding a Neo-Norman porch to the rectangular tower. He continued expanding the house until 1867. The work was for the Rogers family who followed Thomas Johnes of Hafod as the owners of Stanage.

=== Tudor Gothic ===
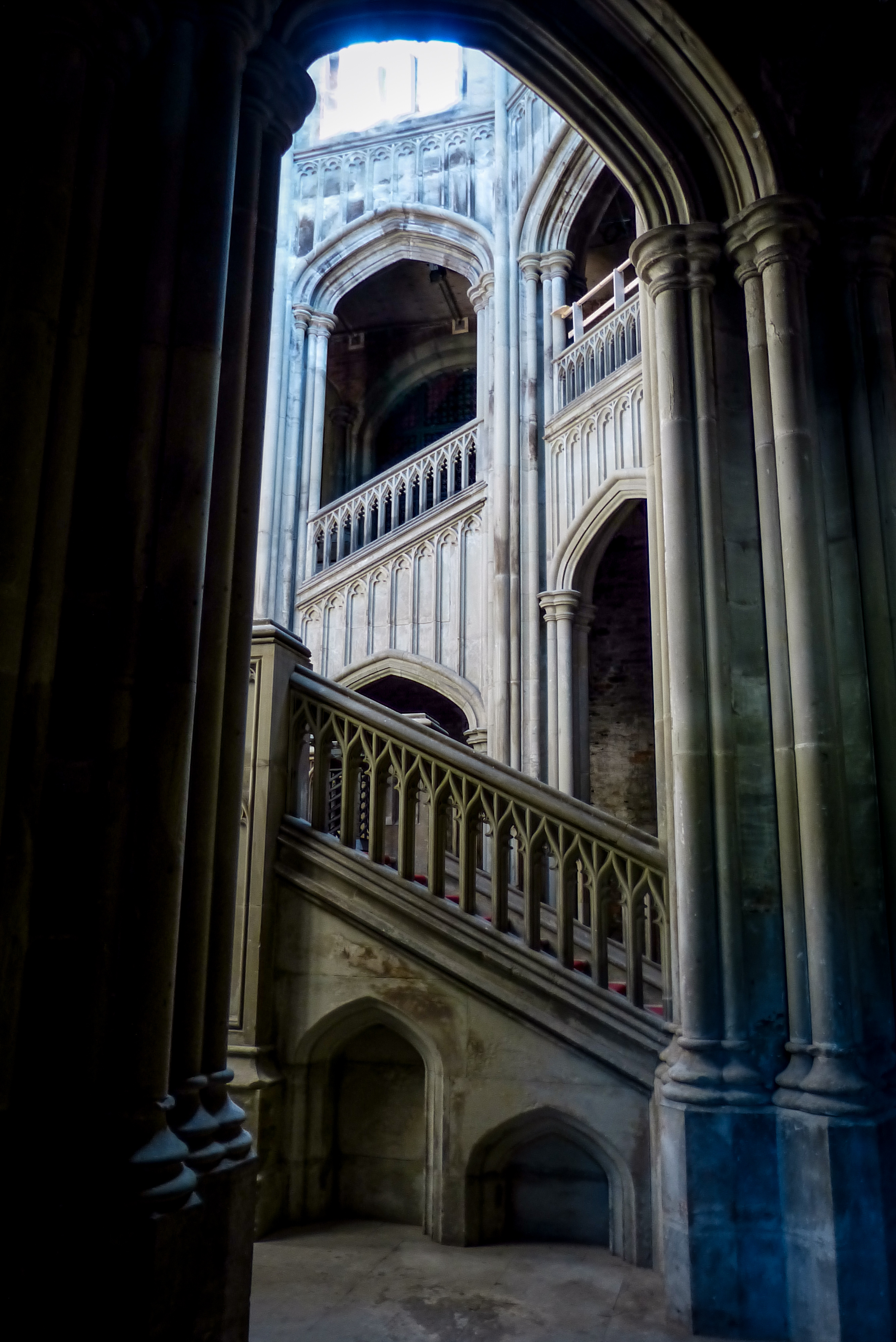
Margam Castle, grand staircase

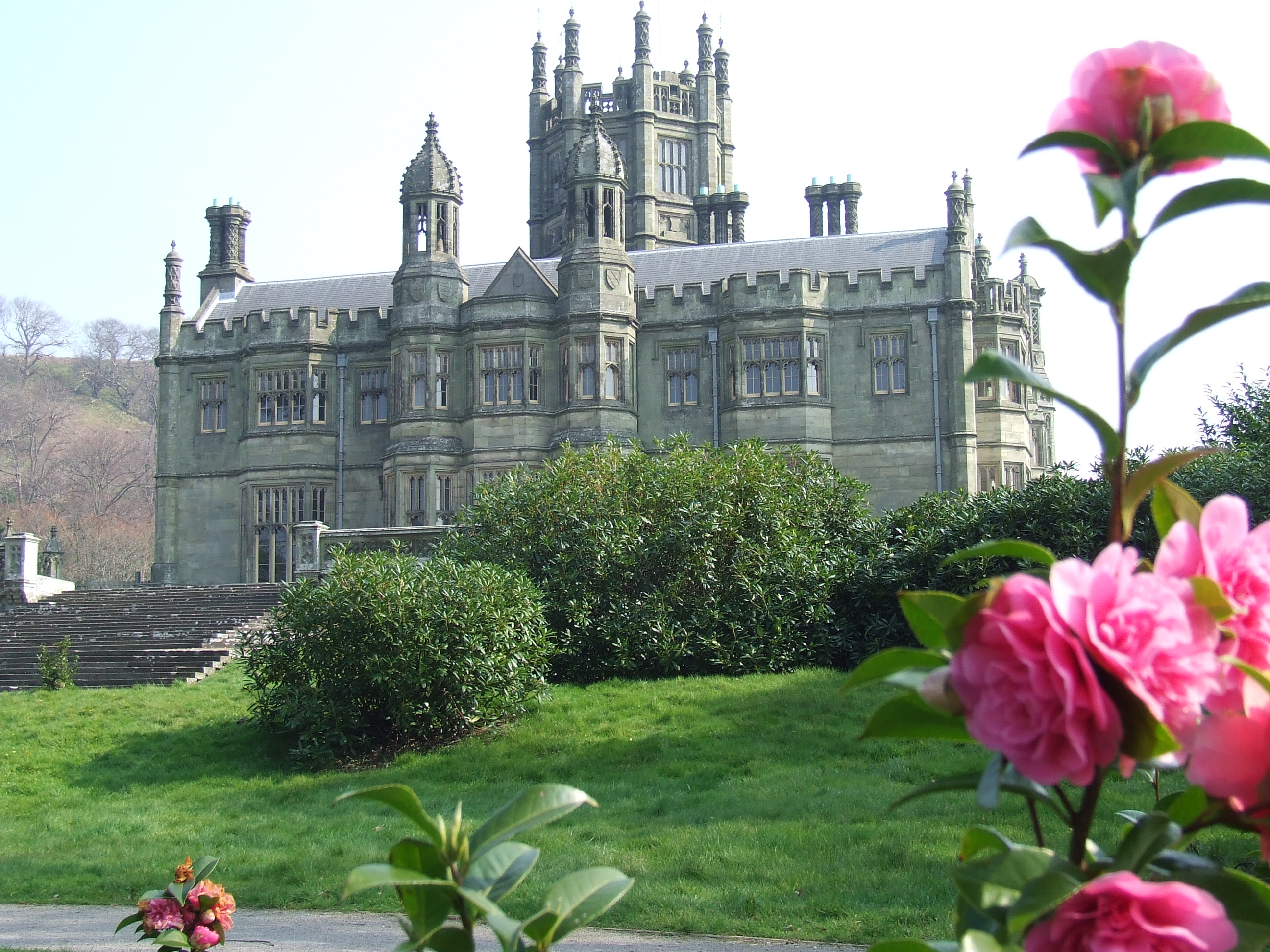
Margam

In the 1830s the Castellated Gothic was developed further by Thomas Hopper, who had been responsible for the severe Romanesque revival Penrhyn Castle and the Shrewsbury architect Edward Haycock, Sr. at Margam Castle in Glamorgan which was built between 1830 and 1840. This was a more ornate and flamboyant form of Tudor Gothic with a massive central lantern tower, modelled on the 16th-century prospect tower at Melbury House in Dorset. Newman sees the Hopper and Haycock deriving their designs from James Wyatt's Ashridge of 1808–1813 and William Wilkin's Dalmeny House near Edinburgh of 1814–1817. While the exterior is Tudor Gothic, there is a spectacular staircase inside the tower in a late Gothic or Perpendicular style with impressive fan-vaulting

At Ruthin the Medieval castle was partly rebuilt in 1826 and then transformed in 1848–1853 by the architect Henry Clutton for Frederick Richard West. Clutton demolished much of the main block of the earlier house and replaced it with a three storied castellated building in bright red sandstone and placed at the west corner a big octagonal tower.

This mixed style is also seen at Llantarnam Abbey in Monmouthshire by Thomas Henry Wyatt. In Montgomeryshire between 1850 and 1856 Leighton Hall was built by the little-known Liverpool architect W. H. Gee, probably to designs by James Kellaway Colling.

=== William and Mary and Queen Anne style ===
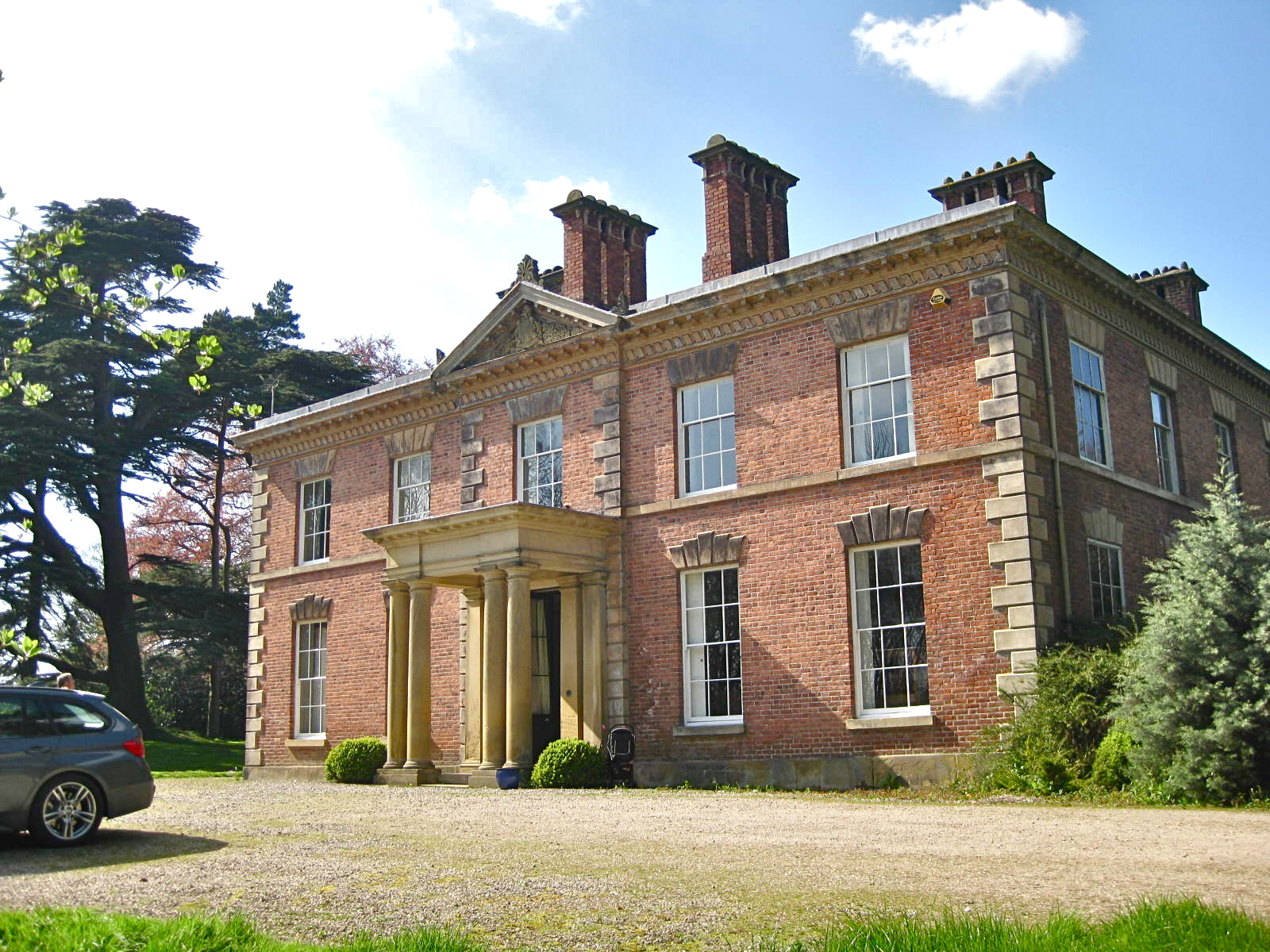
Garthmyl Hall

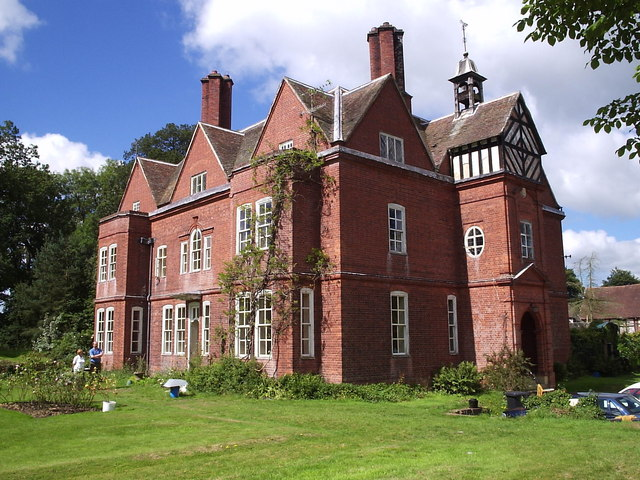
Cefnbryntalch, Llandyssil

An early example of the Queen Anne revival style was Garthmyl Hall, Berriew in Montgomeryshire by J K Colling. It was completed in 1859 and was a pioneering example of the use of Terracotta ornamentation. A more developed example of Queen Anne revival style can be seen nearby in the Severn Valley at Cefnbryntalch in Llandyssil. The house of 1867–1869 by G F Bodley was completed by Philip Webb. It was built for was Richard Jones, who had made a fortune in the flannel trade in Newtown. The exterior is of cleanly detailed and well-executed in red brick, with prominent string-courses. The south front with three big gables and a balance of irregular chimneys and near-regular windows, has many C18 features – a hipped roof, two bays, sash-windows, and the central Venetian window. The symmetrical entrance front is rather C17 vernacular, while the west front is picturesque and irregular in contrast, an asymmetrical gable anchored by a shafted chimney; lower tile-hung wing. In many respects this house is the precursor of the later Arts and Crafts houses in Wales and the close studded upper storeys is a feature of houses such as Bryniago at Rhayader by Stephen W. Williams. The Queen Anne style was further developed by William Eden Nesfield, a close associate of Norman Shaw at Kinmel Park in Denbighshire. It was constructed 1872–1874 incorporating parts of the earlier houses by Samuel Wyatt and Thomas Hopper. The house consists of 15 bays on the E. front with end pavilions

=== Terracotta revival architecture in Wales ===
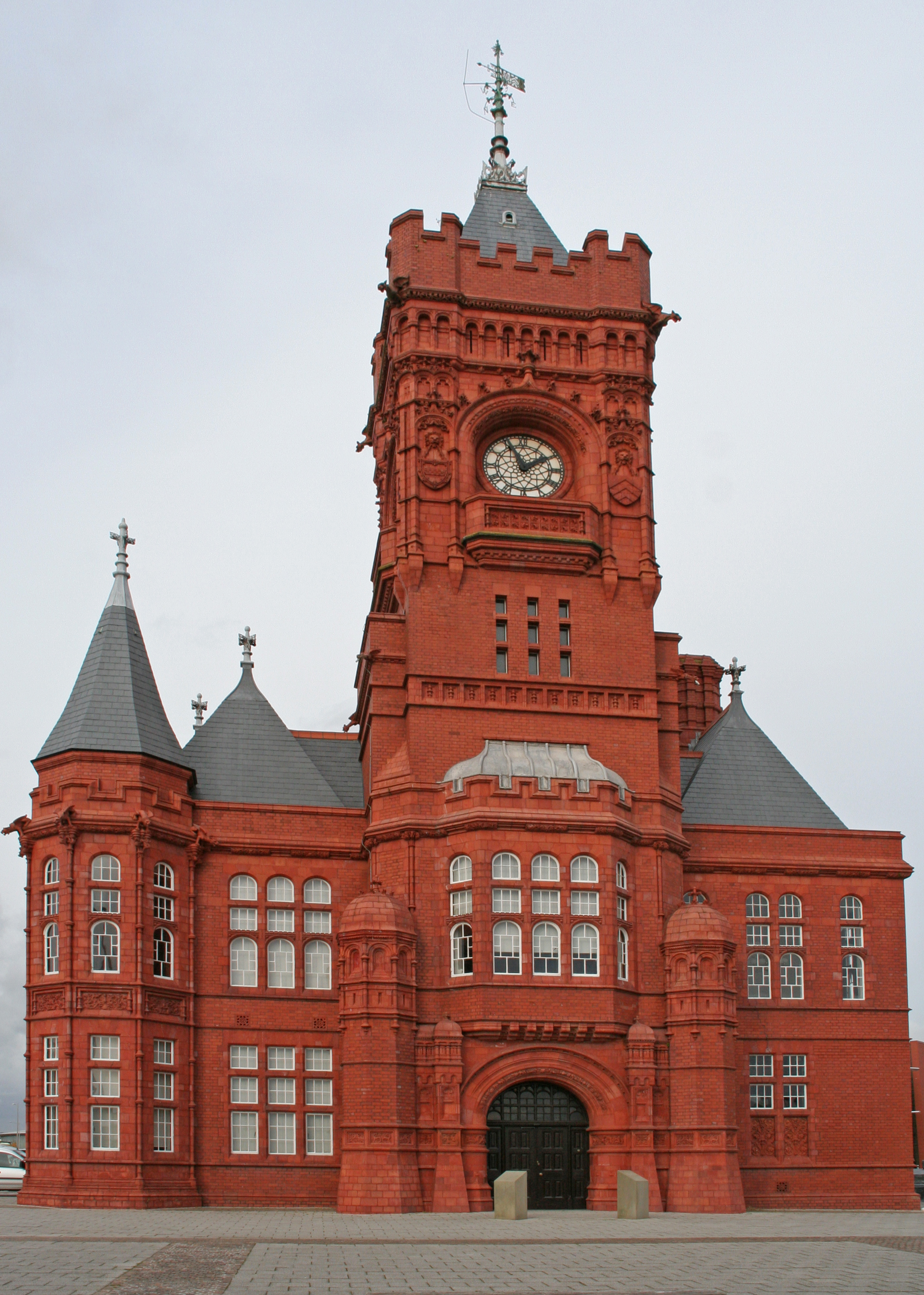
Pierhead Building Cardiff

For a short period at the start of the 16th century, Italian craftsmen introduced the art of highly fired Terracotta moulded brickwork and ornamental plaques into Tudor England. The use of terracotta was largely limited to Great Houses in Eastern England.

One of the earliest architects to make use of this source was the Welsh architect Thomas Penson, who worked from offices in Oswestry. There appears to be good evidence that he sourced his terracotta from the brickyards which were associated with the Oswestry coalfield at Morda and Trefonen on the Welsh border.

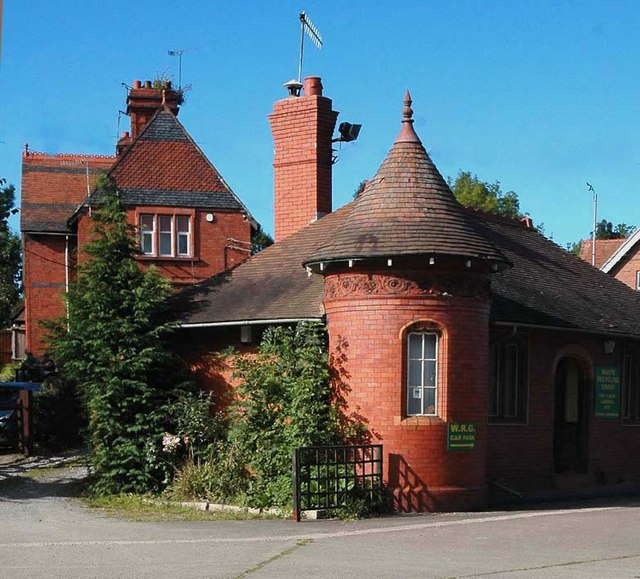
Offices and Gatehouse to J C Edwards Terra cotta works at Pen-y-bont

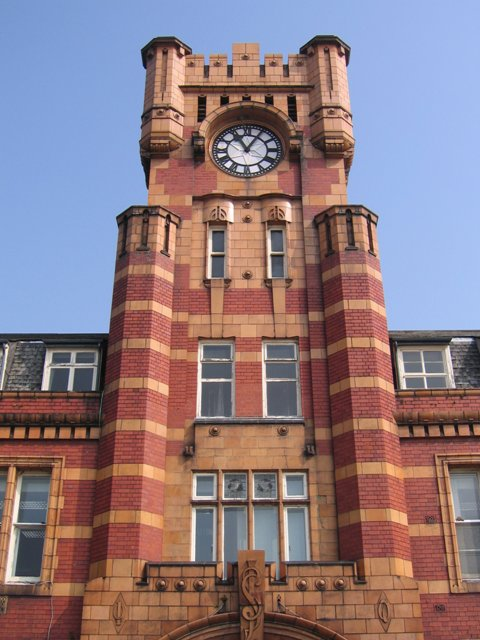
Tower above the entrance to John Summers' Building 1907

One of the most iconic Terracotta buildings in Wales is the Pierhead building at Cardiff Docks, adjacent to the Welsh Assembly building. The Grade One listed building was built in 1897 and designed by the English architect William Frame. It was a replacement for the headquarters of the Bute Dock Company which burnt down in 1892. Frame's mentor was William Burges, with whom Frame worked on the rebuilding of Cardiff Castle and Castell Coch until Burges's death in 1881.

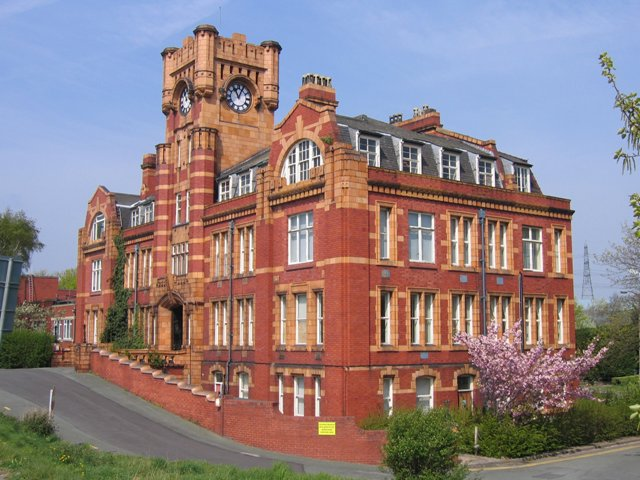
The John Summers Building by the River Dee 1907

A further impressive building using and orangey terracotta with red bricks, probably from J. C Edwards at Ruabon are the former offices of John Summers and Co at Shotton on Deeside in Flintshire These were to become the offices of the Strip Division of the British Steel Corporation. In 1986 Edward Hubbard described them as "unconventional and pompous", but taste to-day might be more appreciative and they can be seen as late and almost playful take on castellated Gothic revival architecture with some Art Nouveau detailing. A building dominating the market place in Newtown in Montgomeryshire is Barclays Bank of 1898 by Wood and Kendrick of Birmingham for Sarah Brisco of Newtown Hall. Built as an office block with the corner clock tower commemorating Queen Victoria's Diamond Jubilee.

In small country towns such as Rhayader in Radnorshire the local architect, Richard Wellings Thomas built both the Kington and Radnor Bank of 1904 and the town's Post Office of 1903 using Ruabon Terracotta. The Bank has heavy classical mouldings while the Post Office for the upper storeys uses the local stone with terracotta dressings. Terracotta was a popular material for building Post Offices, as at Denbigh and particularly the Post Office in Great Darkgate in Aberystwyth. The later was the work of T E Morgan, completed in 1901, and has a mosaic fascia. In Welshpool the J & M Morris's iron foundry had the Agricultural Implement Depot built in Church Street for the display of their products. This was to the designs of the work of the Borough surveyor Robert Hurst around 1904, in deep red Ruabon brickwork with arched display windows with masqued heads used as keystones. The inscription "Agricultural Implement Depot" runs along the parapet of the building.

==== Faience glazed terracotta ====
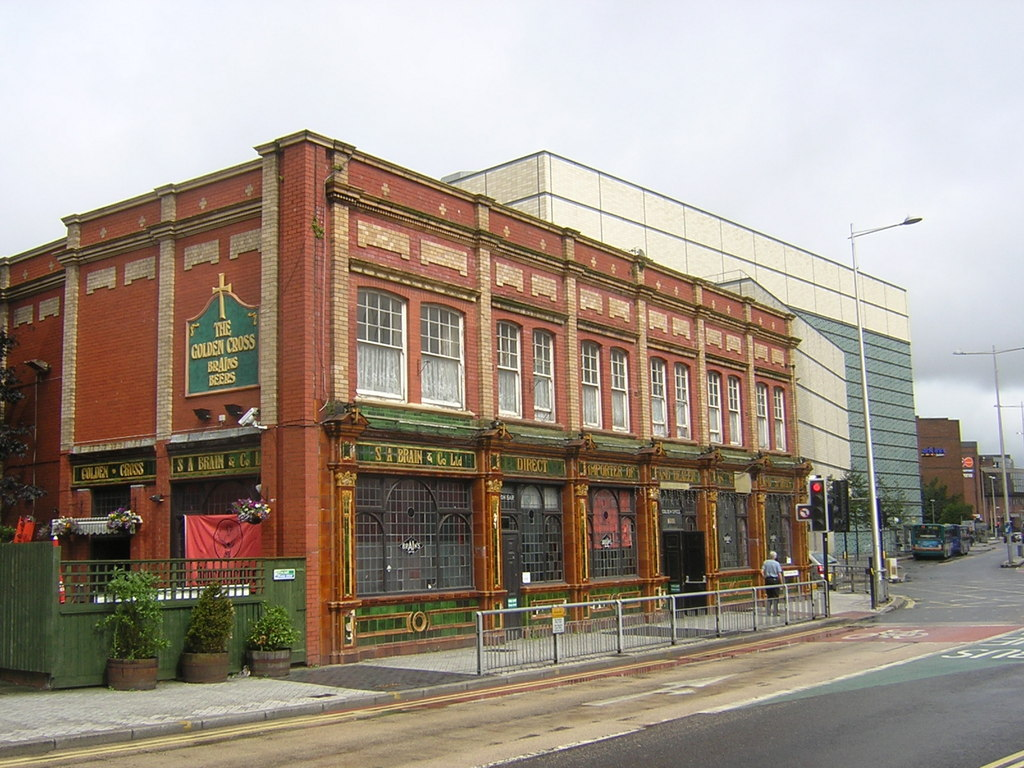
Golden Cross pub, Custom House Street, Cardiff

Glazed architectural terra-cotta starts appearing in building facades in Wales around 1900. An example occurs in Longbridge Street in Llanidloes. This is a double fronted shop faced with brownish Burmantofts faience and the shops with facias with decorative tendril designs.

The Golden Cross public House in Custom House Street, Cardiff, has a two-storey red faience facade with yellow pilasters. The ground floor has an elaborate tiled pub front with Venetian windows; green and gold tiling with raised lettering to fascias, tiled panelling to pilasters. The saloon bar on the ground floor has walls lined with polychrome tiles and a tiled floral frieze. Bar with hard wood top and with external covering of tiles with grotesque pattern in relief. Walls of entrance lobby, with faience tiled picture of Cardiff Castle, dated 1903 and another of Cardiff Town Hall.

The use of white Doulton faience glazed terracotta is notable for the Motor Palace at Llandrindod Wells by Richard Wellings Thomas in 1906–1910. Now the National Cycle Museum, it has a curving facade of nine bays of white-faience ware and blocked pilasters dividing the display bays, surmounted with lion finials. It is an early example of steel framed construction. The building reflects that Llandridod was the social capital of Wales at the time and Tom Norton, for whom it was built was both an early bus proprietor and also aviator, hence the fascia letting CYCLES – MOTORS- AIRCRAFT.

=== Ruskinian Gothic & Polychrome brickwork ===
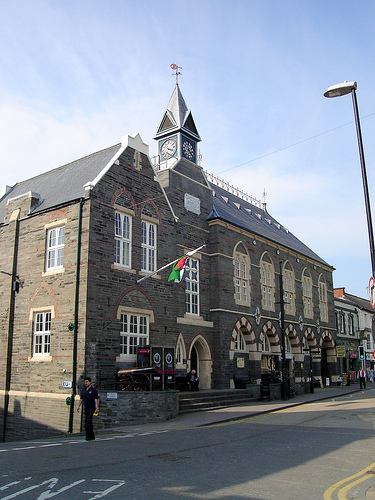
Town Hall, Cardigan

The influence of John Ruskin and G E Street can be seen on British architecture from the mid-1850s onwards following the publication of Ruskin's Stones of Venice. Ruskin and Street advocated styles of architecture which used striking colour combinations and were modelled on Venetian and north Italian Gothic architecture. There is little evidence of Ruskinian Gothic in Wales, but with the notable exception of Cardigan Town Hall, but it did give rise to the use of Polychrome brickwork. Cardigan Town Hall was designed by Robert Jewell Withers and built in 1858–60. It was a multi-purpose civic building acting as a Town Hall, Corn Exchange, Grammar School, News-room, corn store and markets. The clock and clock tower were added in 1896.

An example of Ruskin's Venetian Gothic are the block of chambers at 24–26 Queen Street Cardiff. These have been attributed to C E Barnard, apparently a Civil Engineer and were originally built alongside the Glamorgan Canal, possibly giving the inspiration to build in the Venetian Gothic style. The construction is dated to 1878, although this stylistically seem a decade or more too late. The building has a four storied facade with Stucco and Portland stone and seven bays. Gothic cornice with pierced pinnacles at either end with ornamental battlements. The third floor has single windows with rounded heads and rope-moulded architraves and the second floor has ogee-headed windows with floreated stringcourses and projecting balconies to single windows, and the first floor has trefoil headed windows with capped columns arranged in Venetian manner either side of a splayed oriel window.

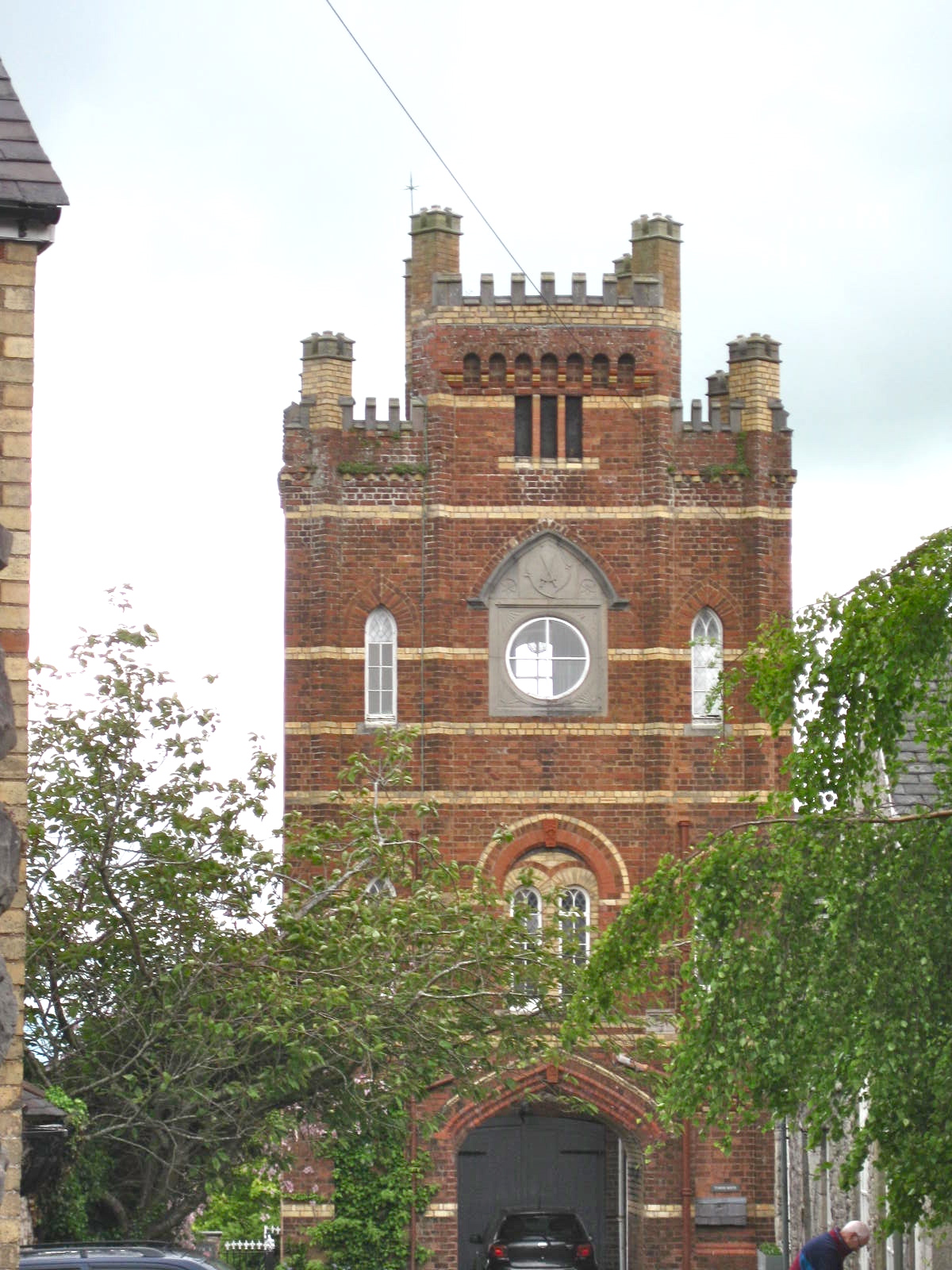
Plas Castell Gatehouse, Denbigh

The use of patterned or polychrome brickwork, sometimes associated terracotta was popular in the towns in Montgomeryshire and North Eastern Wales in the 1870s and 1880s. A striking example is the Plas Castell Gatehouse at Denbigh, a Tudoresque machicolated tower with bars of yellow brick contrasting with the red bricks. The tower was built in 1882. In Kerry, Montgomeryshire the estate architects J W Poundley and D Walker produced an unusual composition of a terrace of houses built for the Naylors next to the former Kerry workhouse. The red bricks are punctuated by a double string of white brick and a pattern of white and black bricks below the eaves and for the upper voussoirs. The use of curved bricks in the voussoirs give the impression of an Egyptian pharonic head-dress.

=== Italianate style architecture ===
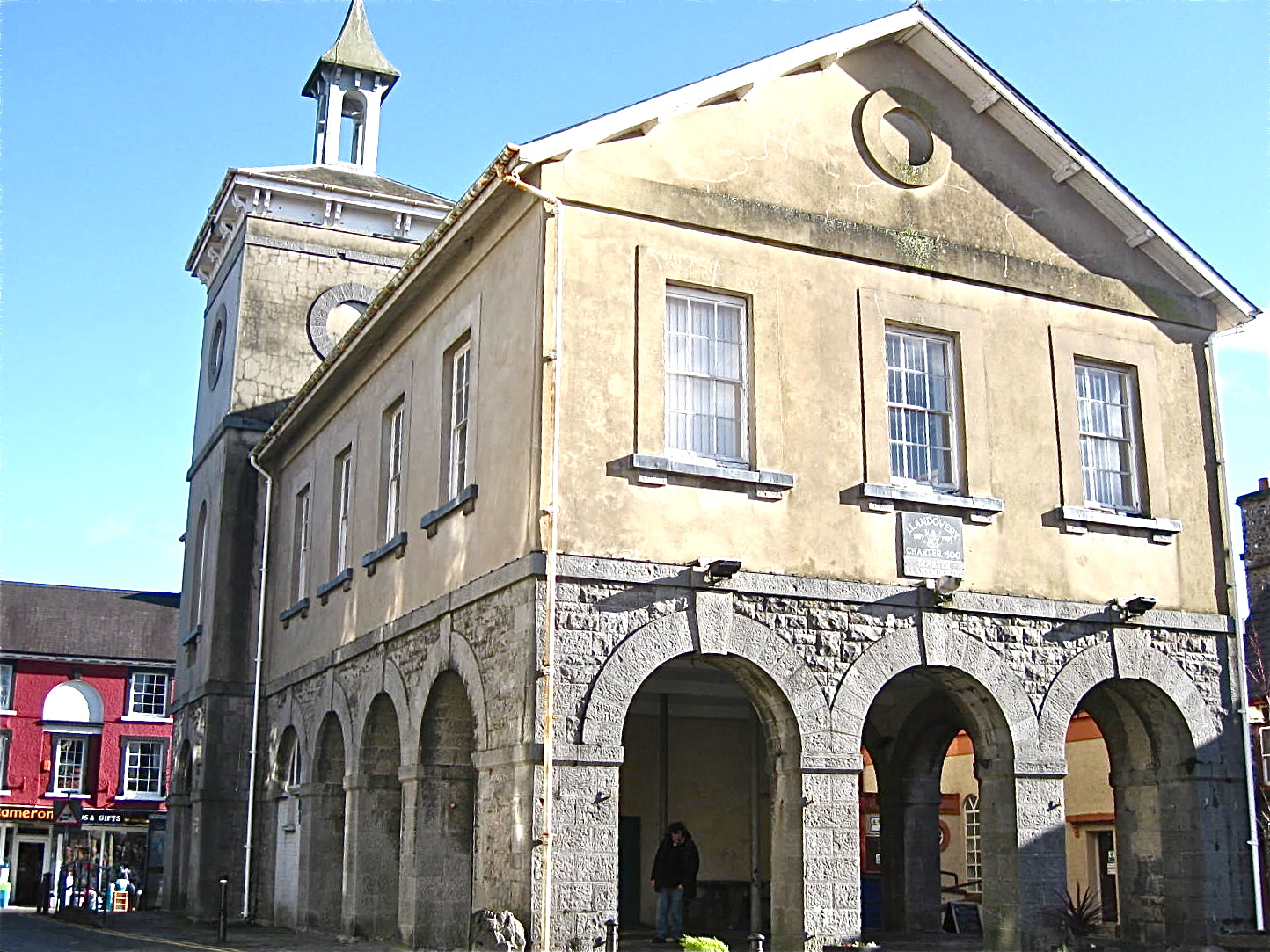
Llandovery Town Hall, by R K Penson, 1857-8

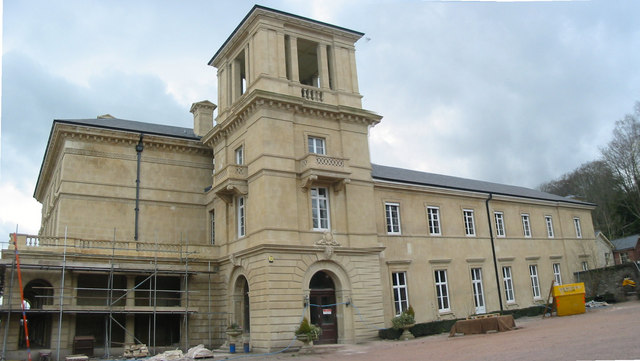
Penoyre House, near Brecon

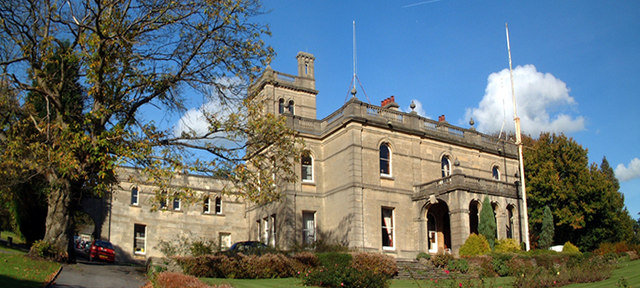
Parc Howard museum 1882-6

Prompted by Queen Victoria's Osbourne House, the Italianate style of architecture became popular in the second half of the 19th century. Features of this stye include belvedere towers and roofs with a shallow slope and wide eaves. In Wales R. K Penson was a leading exponent of the style. Penson had an extensive practice in the south of Wales, particular in church building and restoration, but examples of his use of the Italianate style include Llandovery Town Hall and the gate lodge to Nanteos. The style was popular for country houses in Carmarthenshire and include the now demolished Pant Glas at Llanfynydd and Gellideg at Llandyfaelog. Pant Glas was built in 1850 and Gellideg in 1852. The architect for the latter being William Wesley Jenkins. A later example of the Italianate style is the Parc Howard Museum on the outskirts of Llanelli, originally known as Bryncaerau Castle. The house, faced in Bath stone was built to designs by J. B. Wilson between 1882 and 1886.

=== Old College, Aberystwyth ===
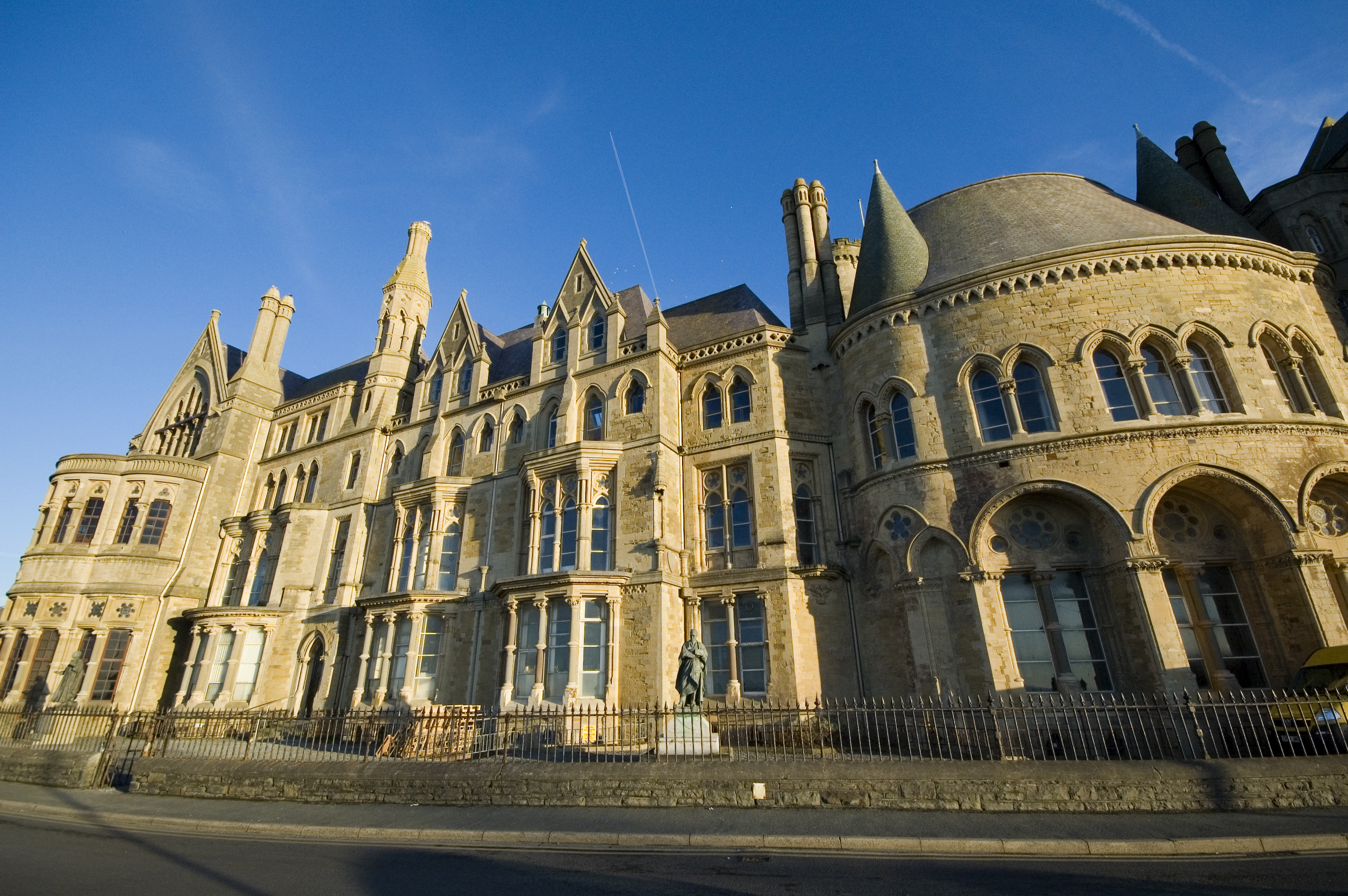
Aberystwyth Old University Building.

J.P. Seddon was a London architect who developed an extensive practice in south Wales. Initially he worked with John Prichard from 1853 to 1859 and then with John Coates Carter, who had an office in Cardiff, until 1904. Seddon was surveyor to Llandaff Cathedral and most of his work was church building and parsonages for the Llandaff Diocese.

Seddon built some notable country houses such as Abermad House in Llanilar, Ceredigion in 1870–1872 and most notably the Old College Building of Aberystwyth University. The Old College Building is on the seafront and replaced Castle House, which had been built for Uvedale Price by John Nash in 1791–1794. Castle House had been bought by the railway entrepreneur Thomas Savin in 1864 and he employed Seddon to rebuild it as a hotel. Following Savin's bankruptcy in 1866, it was purchased by the future university and until 1890 Seddon together with his partner John Coates Carter continued to rebuild and extend the building. The Builder described it as "one of the most original and characteristic monuments of the Gothic Revival", while Thomas Lloyd writes "Seddon's originality lies in his very fluid use of curves and complex geometrical forms, and in the blurring of angles and joints, syncopation that has something of Art Nouveau". Seddon mixes detail of Early English with Venetian and French late Romanesque and Gothic Architecture. The stone used comes from Cefn at Minera, dressed with Bath stone. He also used an artificial stone and concrete in parts of the building.

=== William Burges in Cardiff ===
William Burges' contribution to Welsh architecture was notable but limited to three buildings, Cardiff Castle, Castell Coch and Park House, all three in Cardiff. His castles had little influence on other architecture in Wales. The influence of Park House was much more significant; John Newman considers the house "revolutionized Cardiff's domestic architecture" and the Cadw Grade I listed building status given to the house records it as "the pattern for much housing in Cardiff in later C19. Perhaps the most important (nineteenth century) town house in Wales."

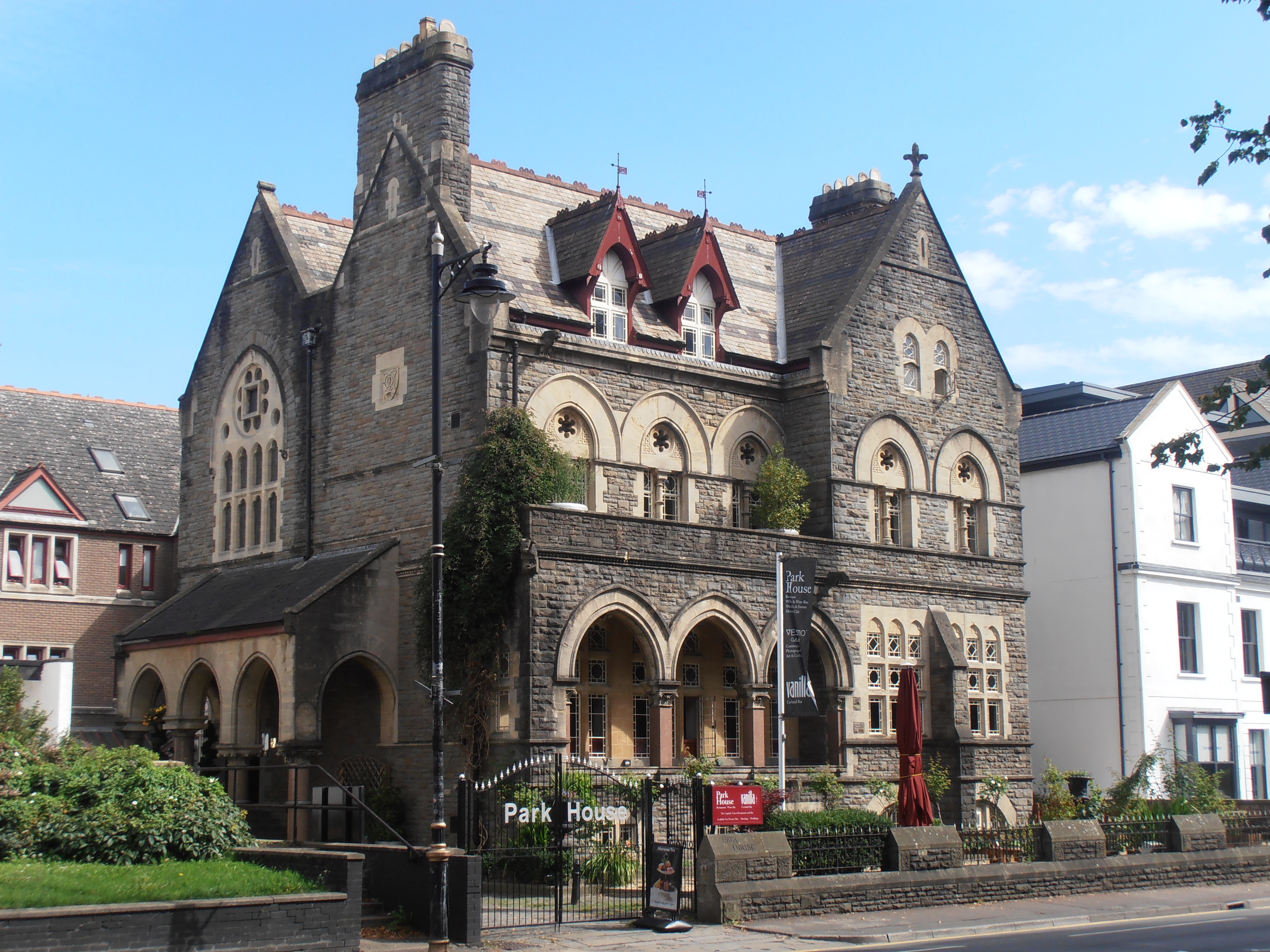
Park House, Park Place, Cardiff

Park House was built between 1871 and 1875 for James McConnochie, the dock engineer to Bute Estate and mayor of Cardiff. The house draws on various French Gothic elements and is reminiscent of the Town Hall of St. Antonin, restored by Viollet le Duc in 1843, with late Romanesque and a Gothic arcade, but with added 15th-century dormer windows. It is built with grey Caerphilly stone and Bath stone dressings; steeply pitched slate roofs, stone chimneys. Features of the house were imitated by other late Victorian houses in Cardiff, but similar houses such as Llanilar at Abermad (1870–1872) in Ceredigion were being built by John Pollard Seddon.

== Planned townscapes, rural and industrial housing ==
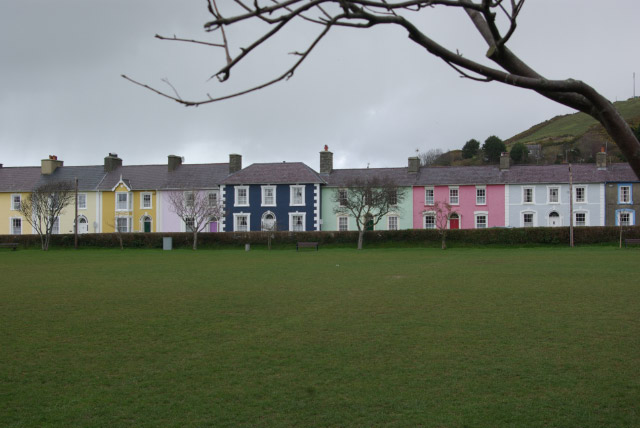
Alban Square, Aberaeron laid out Edward Haycock

During the latter part of the 18th century and during the 19th century, the laying out of towns, villages and industrial settlements gathered momentum. It was work often done by architects and land-surveyors. The layout and design of Aberaeron can now be confidently assigned to Edward Haycock and he probably also involved in the development of Aberystwyth. William Jernagen of Swansea is likely to have laid out the three parallel streets forming the core of Milford Haven in 1792–3. At Newtown the development of the Crescent and Penygloddfa to the work of Thomas Penson. The grid pattern layout at Pembroke Docks has been attributed to the land surveyor George Gwyther, while the Royal Dockyard and its buildings were probably to the original design of John Rennie and carried out by Edward Holl, architect to the Navy Board. In the 19th century many estate villages were laid out by large landowners, often by the architects, in order to build or rebuild their own houses. Intriguingly Lord Sudeley at Gregynog was to experiment in 1870 with concrete houses for his estate workers at Tregynon The following is a selection of some of the Industrial and Estate village built in this period:

- Morristown was constructed as "Wales' earliest planned industrial village", laid out on a grid pattern designed by William Edwards and named after its founder, Sir John Morris, Bt. Originally named "Morris Town", but shortened to the single word "Morriston". The Welsh language translation of the name is Treforys. Sir John Morris was also responsible for the construction between 1768 and 1774 of Morris Castle, widely considered to have been the world's first accommodation built specifically for workers by their employer. Little of the structure remains today, although its ruins are visible on high ground above the nearby Landore district. Morriston was initially constructed for the workers of the tinplate and copper industries that built up along the banks of the River Tawe in the 18th century. However, tin-plating had almost vanished from the area by the end of the Second World War, with production in South West Wales concentrated at new works in Felindre and Port Talbot.

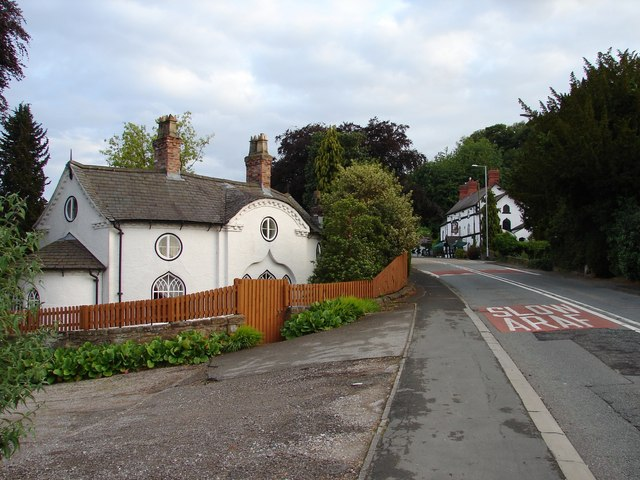
Cottage Ornee Village at Marford

- Marford near Wrexham is noted for its quaint looking Gothic revival cottages, built as part of the former Trevalyn Hall estates probably between 1803 in the cottage orné style. It has been described as "a delightful Gothick estate village" The layout of the estate may be credited John Boydell (nephew of the engraver) who was the agent for the George Boscawen, and a builder, Julius Flower of Hungerford is known to have been employed to build a cottage in pisé or clay in 1814.

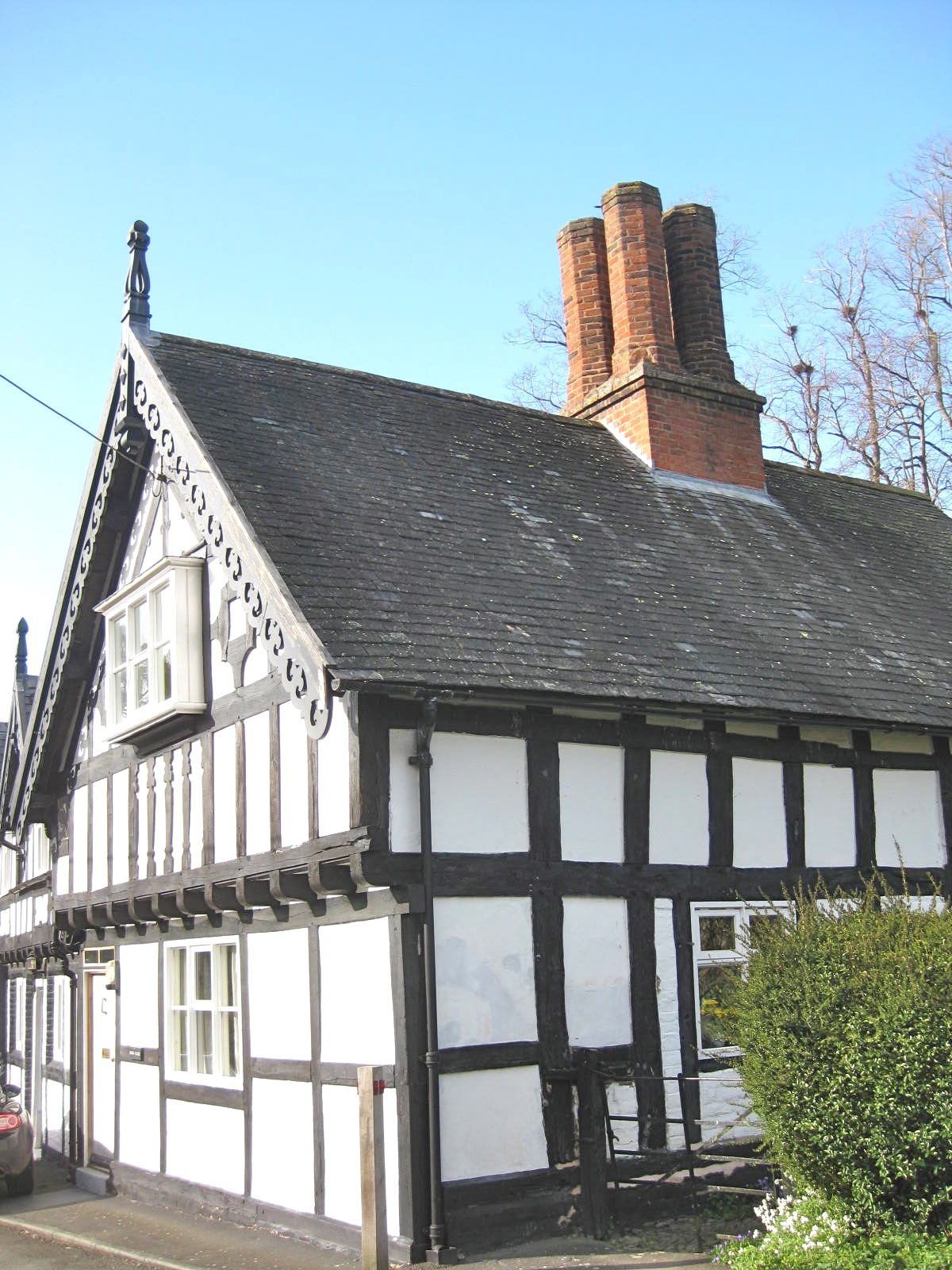
Berriew, Montgomeryshire

- Berriew is best remembered for its half-timbered cottages which cluster around the churchyard and along the banks of the river Rhiew. These can probably be attributed to Thomas Penson. In the late 1830s, at the same time as Penson was working on remodelling Vaynor Park in Berriew for John Winder Lion-Winder, he was also remodelling and building houses in Berriew for the Vaynor estate. As a result of his work Berriew developed as a village with many Cottage Ornée houses. Some of these were rebuilt from earlier timber framed buildings, while others were built in a Tudor Revival style and are some of the earliest examples of Black-and-white Revival architecture. Penson's work can be recognised by the massive brick chimney stacks which have been added to the houses, the ornamental bargeboards to the gables and in some cases the black and white painting on the brick work to give the impression of timber framing.
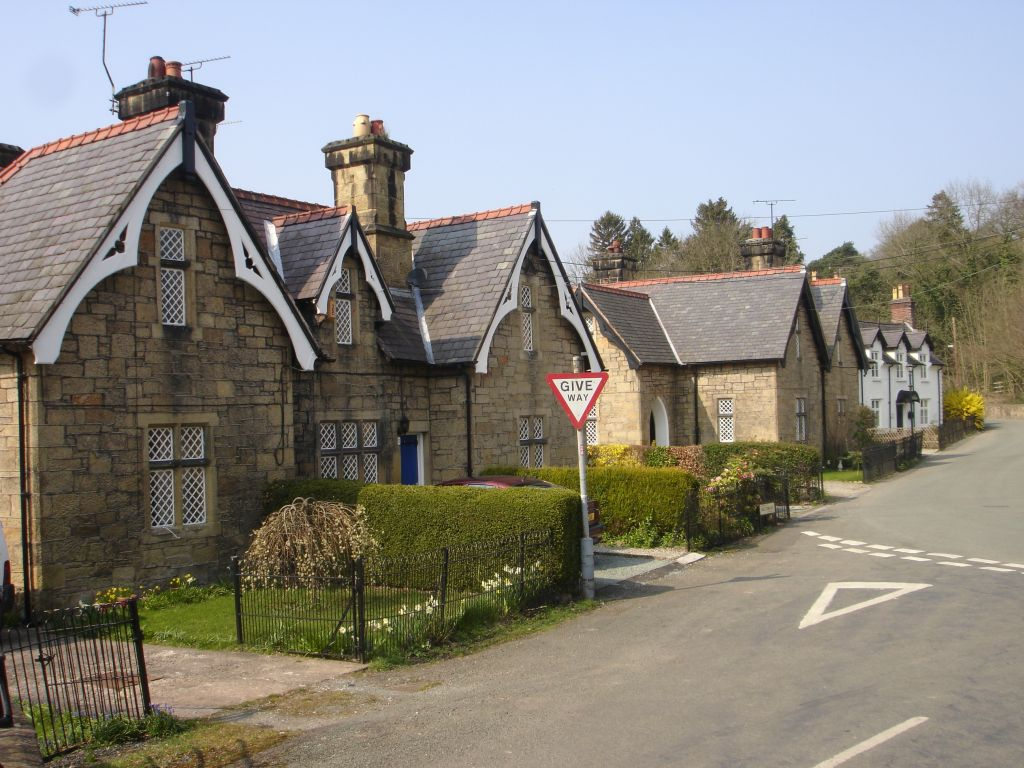
  Cottages by John Gibson for the Plas Power EstateBersham
  .
- Bersham. Two groupings of estate cottages for Thomas Lloyd Fitzhugh of Plas Power by John Gibson, architect, of London. Gibson who worked with Sir Charles Barry on the Houses of Parliament is best known as the architect for the Marble Church, Bodelwyddan. The first group of cottages of 1859 have decorative bargeboards.
- Llandegai, the Estate village for Penrhyn Castle laid out in the mid-19th century by James Wyatt !795–1882), son of Benjamin Wyatt. Picturesque Tudor style cottages with steep gables

== Industrial and workers' housing ==
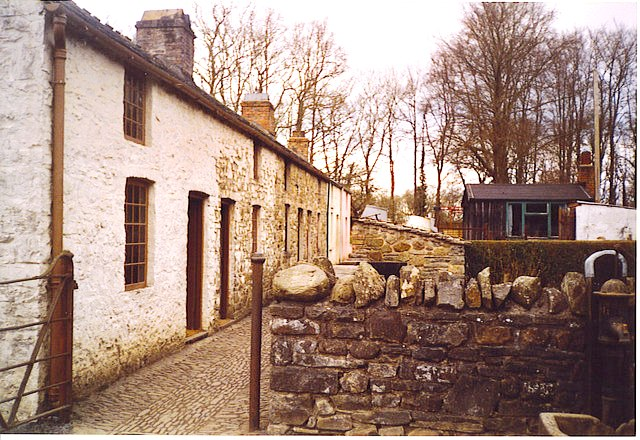
Cottages from Rhyd-y-Car, now at St Fagans

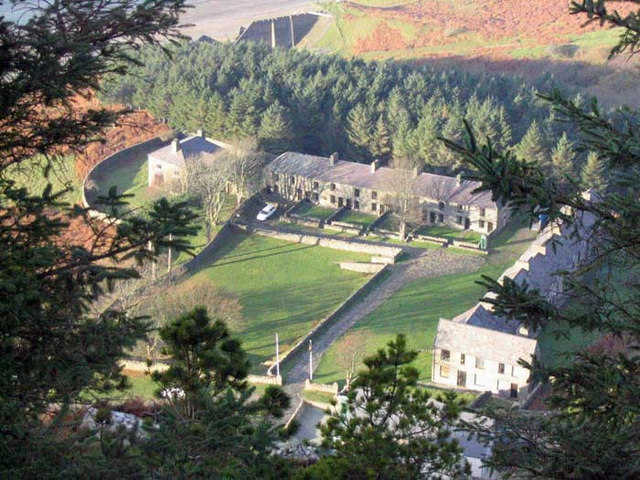
Nant Gwrtheyrn Quarrying settlement

In many areas of Wales extensive areas of workers housing appeared in the 19th century, The rows of terraced housing for coal miner's stretching along the contours of the south Wales valleys are well known. In the areas of the Steel and Tinplate industries similar housing exist and Ironworkers cottages at Rhyd-y-Car in Merthyr Tydfil have been rebuilt at St Fagan's Folk Museum. while slate and other quarrying settlements in north Wales were often located in remote and isolated places such as Cwm [Penmachno] or Nant Gwrtheyrn. At Nant Gwertheyn, now a Welsh Language learning centre, is situated in a steep ravine and the granite was shipped out by sea. It was originally laid out c. 1878 for the granite quarry workers. There are two terraces of cottages, a Quarry manager's house and a chapel round a green. The quarry closed in 1914 and the last inhabitant left in 1959. For some skilled workers very much better housing was provided. Railway workers at Railway Terrace in Ruthin were provided with rather superior accommodation by the long closed Vale of Clwyd Railway in 1864

== Jacobethan & Tudorbethan ==
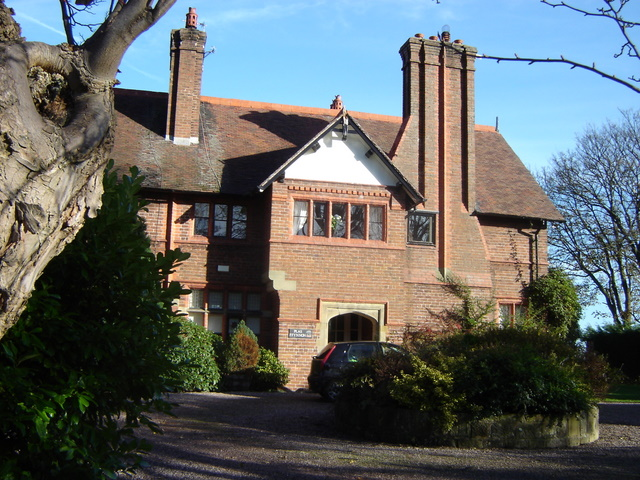
Plas Fynnon, Nercwys, 1877

The work of John Douglas the Chester architect, extended into Wales. Plas Fynnon, Nercwys, built as the vicarage to St. Mary's Parish Church in Tudorbethan style has been attributed to him. Built of brown brick with red brick and sandstone detailing under a steeply pitched tiled roof with over sailing eaves and plain ridge. Asymmetrical facade with advanced, 2-storey gabled porch with moulded purlin-ends, brackets and plain finial. Tudor-arched entrance of tooled ashlar, stopped and moulded and with date 1877 carved in the spandrels. Another example of Douglas working in the Tudorbethan style was Wigfair Hall, a large country house of 1882–1884 standing in an elevated position above the River Elwy near the village of Cefn Meiriadog, Denbighshire, Wales. It is constructed in red Ruabon brick on a limestone plinth with sandstone dressings, and a Ruabon tile roof. It has an L-shape with a main north wing and a west service wing. The style was used by the Shrewsbury architect James Pickhard for building Fronfraith Hall in Llandyssil in Montgomeryshire in 1863.

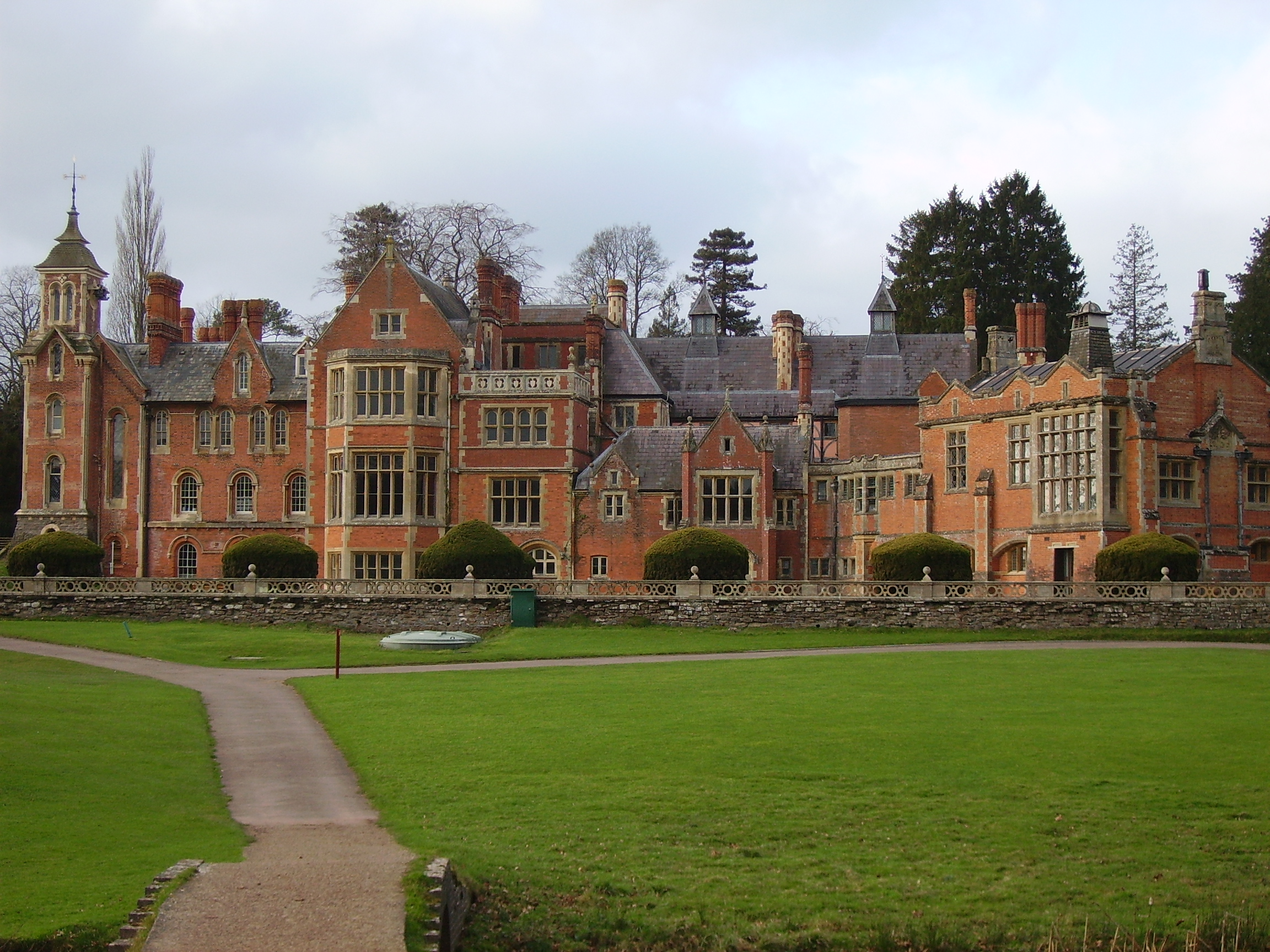
The Hendre in Monmouthshire.

A more important example of this style is the Neo-Tudor extensions to The Hendre in Monmouthshire, the seat of the Rolls family. The original hunting lodge was constructed in a Neo-Norman style by an unknown architect in the 1820s. This was extended by T. H. Wyatt between 1837 and 1841. Then, from 1870 to the mid-1880s, Wyatt and his clerk of works, Henry Pope added a great Hall, an entrance court and a massive dining-room wing in Neo-Tudor style. Finally in 1895–1896 one of the leading architects of the period, Aston Webb, added the Arts and Crafts Neo-Tudor Library Wing. This created a house with a corridor from the front door to the library of no less than 75 metres. The interior was furnished with much genuine Tudor and Jacobean woodwork, which had been collected from local houses.

== Arts and crafts ==
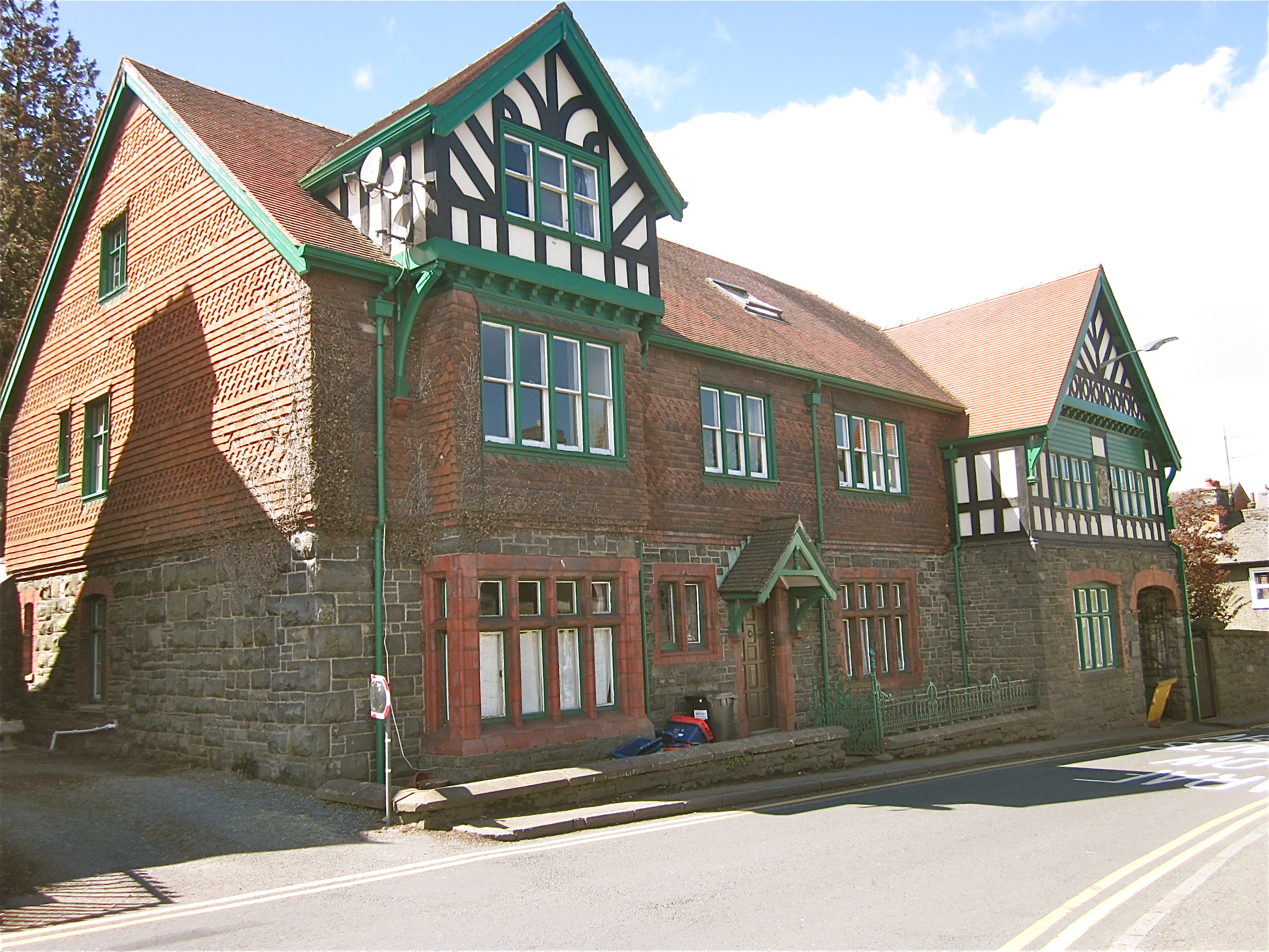
Bryniargo House, Rhayader 1893

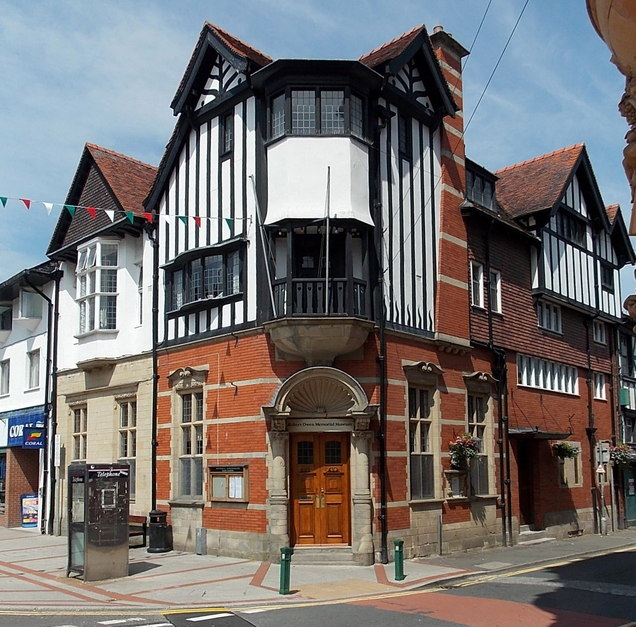
Free Library, Newtown (now the Robert Owen Museum), Frank Shayler, 1902

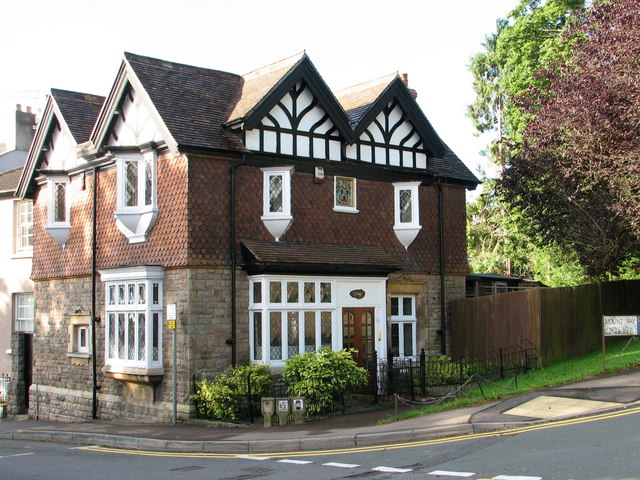
Chepstow – The Lodge on Mount Way

Arts and Crafts architecture can be seen as an extension of the Tudorbethan Style in Wales. It is seen as starting c. 1887 under the influence of William Morris and was introduced into Wales by architects such as William Eden Nesfield who was responsible for the rebuilding of Kinmel Hall and the designer W.A.S Benson who was the architect for Clochfaen at Llangurig in Montgomeryshire. These architects very much favoured the use of half-timbered decoration, red brickworks, roof tiles and tile hanging on walls. A notable architect in this tradition was Frank Shayler who had set up offices in Oswestry and Shrewsbury and developed an extensive practice particularly in Montgomeryshire. Shayler, together with other architects in his practice were patronised by Lord Davies of Llandinam and were responsible for a series of Institute buildings in Montgomeryshire, as well as restoring a number of half timbered buildings such as the Mermaid in Welshpool and Glyndŵr's Parliament House in Machynlleth. In Radnorshire the architect Stephen W. Williams also worked in this style and built the Offices in Rhayader for the supervision of the Elan Valley Reservoir project. A good example of this style providing domestic housing is the Lodge at Chepstow, built between 1902 and 1908 by an unknown architect. Newman describes this as "a witty, if rather belated essay in Norman Shaw style" with stone, tile hanging and half-timbered gables.

=== Later Arts and Crafts ===
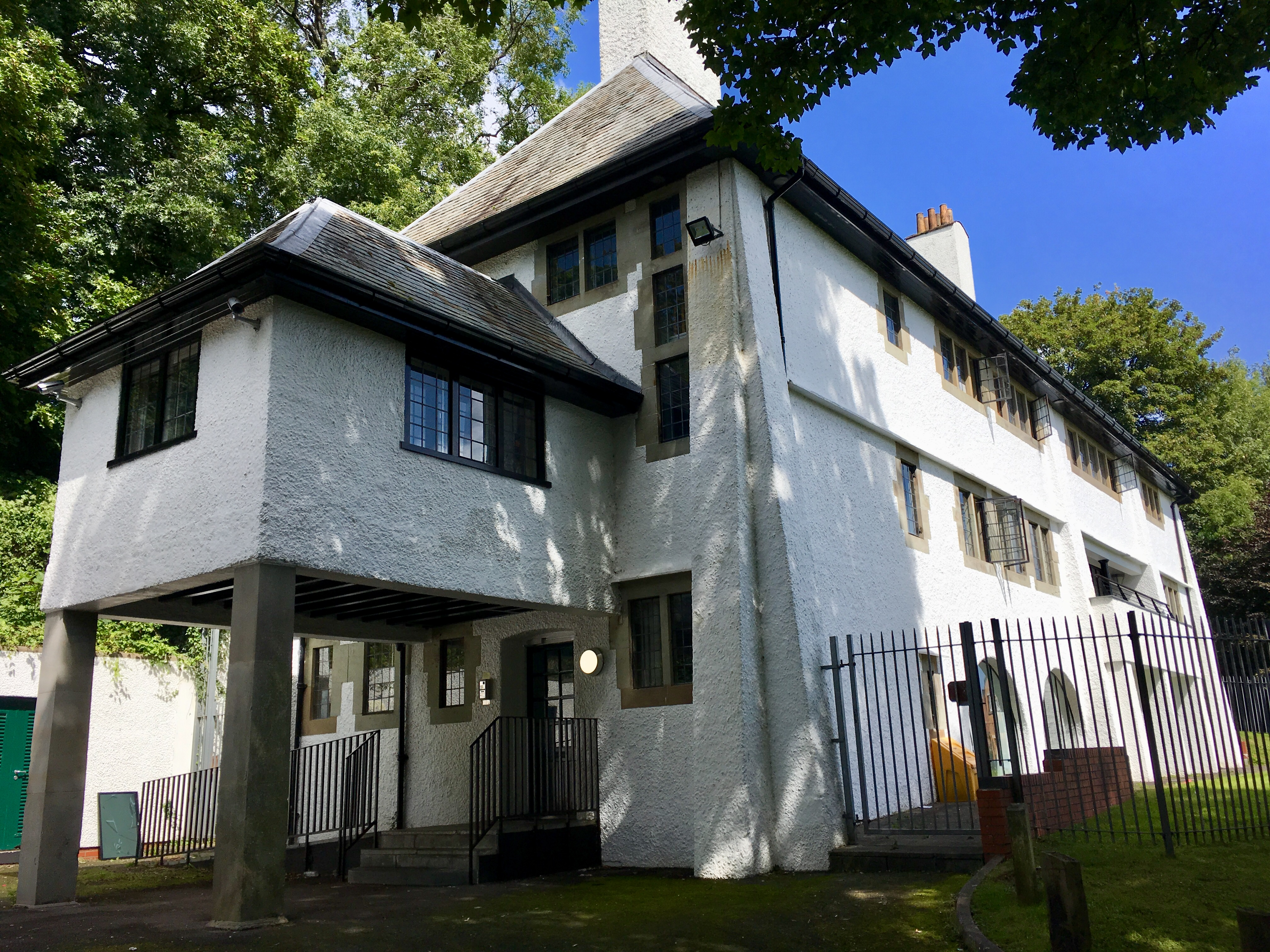
Tŷ Bronna

The Arts and Crafts movement progressed in Wales very much under the influence of C. F. A. Voysey and Edwin Lutyens, who were throwing off the influence of both the Gothic Revival and the half-timbered Tudor Revival styles which had been so prevalent in Wales. Voysey had worked in partnership with J. P. Seddon with offices in Cardiff, but, as yet no examples of his work with Seddon have been recognised. Then, in 1903–1906, he returned to Wales to design the little-known Tŷ Bronna on St Fagans Road, Cardiff. This is a minor masterpiece with its clean white outline, faced in stone, gabled at each end with a hipped roof and the angled battered buttresses from ground level to the eaves. It has a bowed east window with a recessed veranda and was restored in 2002. Pevsner sees buildings such as this by Voysey as being a precursor of Modernist architecture.

Architecture of this style was produced by Herbert Luck North in north Wales and on occasion by Clough Williams-Ellis in his designs for council smallholdings adapted by Montgomeryshire County Council. This style was developed by the Garden City movement and was widely used on Welsh garden villages and housing schemes until after the Second World War.

At Harlech the Glasgow architect George Henry Walton, better known for his Art Nouveau architecture, was to design Wern Fawr in 1908 and also the St David's Hotel (1907–1911); the latter burnt down in 1922.

== Cardiff architecture of the Victorian and early 20th centuries ==
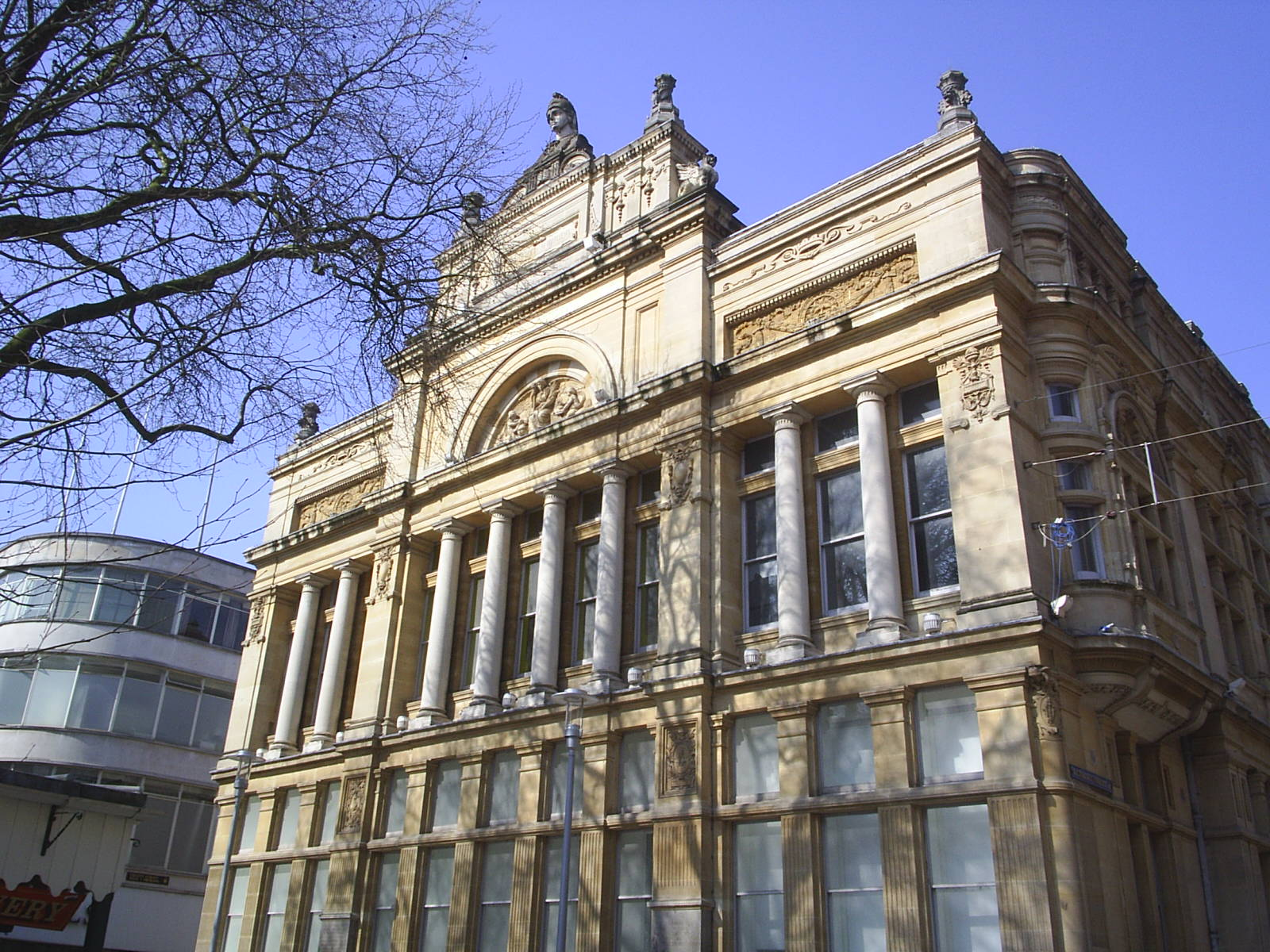
Cardiff Old Library, South Front 1882

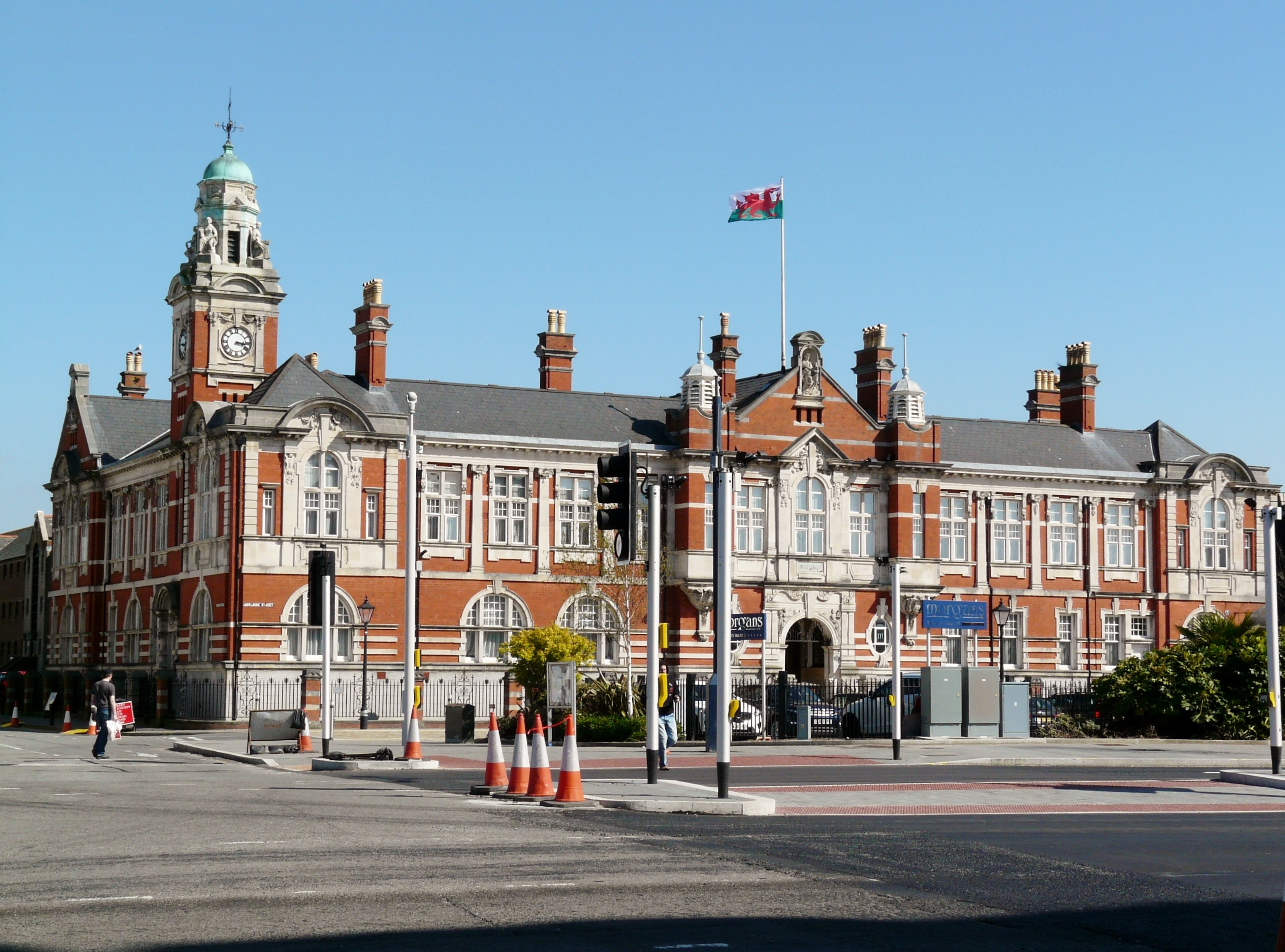
Morgans Hotel, Swansea

An architect who made a notable contribution to the public and commercial architecture of Cardiff was Edwin Seward. In 1875, he became part of the James, Seward and Thomas Partnership. In 1880 Seward won a competition for the design of the Cardiff Free Library, which consisted of a Library, Museum and Schools for Science and Art. The first phase was completed in 1882, but it was not finally completed until 1896. In 1881 Seward enlarged the Cardiff Union Workhouse with a new entrance building on the Cowbridge Road frontage with a 3-storey tower and clock face, still in a late Gothic revival style. This building was to become the St David's Hospital. This was also the style Seward adopted for the Cardiff Royal Infirmary of 1883

Seward's next building, the Cardiff Coal Exchange in Butetown was built between 1883 and 1888 and it is moving more towards a Baroque revival style, although Newman calls it a "debased French Renaissance style". In 1894 Seward produced his "Dream of the Future" for Cardiff, which appeared in the Western Mail in February 1894 and also plans for Cardiff Museum. This, however, was overtaken by the development of Cathays Park starting in 1905, for which he did not get a commission. In 1895 he designed the Morgan Arcade in Cardiff and the following year the Turner Gallery at Penarth. Finally in 1902–1903 he was responsible for the monumental Swansea Docks Trust Office now Morgans Hotel, Swansea.

== Earlier 20th-century architecture ==
=== Baroque Revival architecture ===
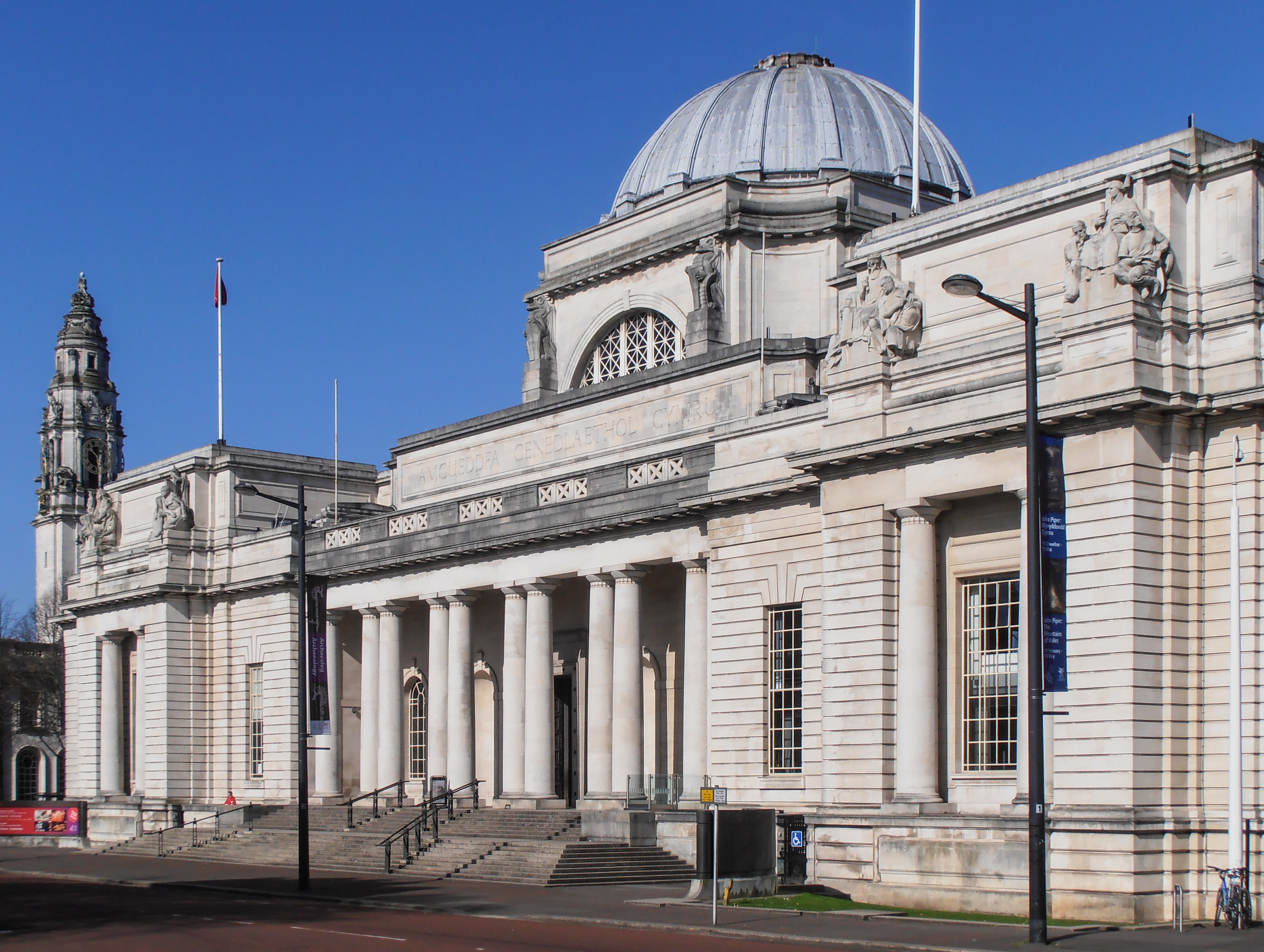
National Museum of Wales, Cardiff

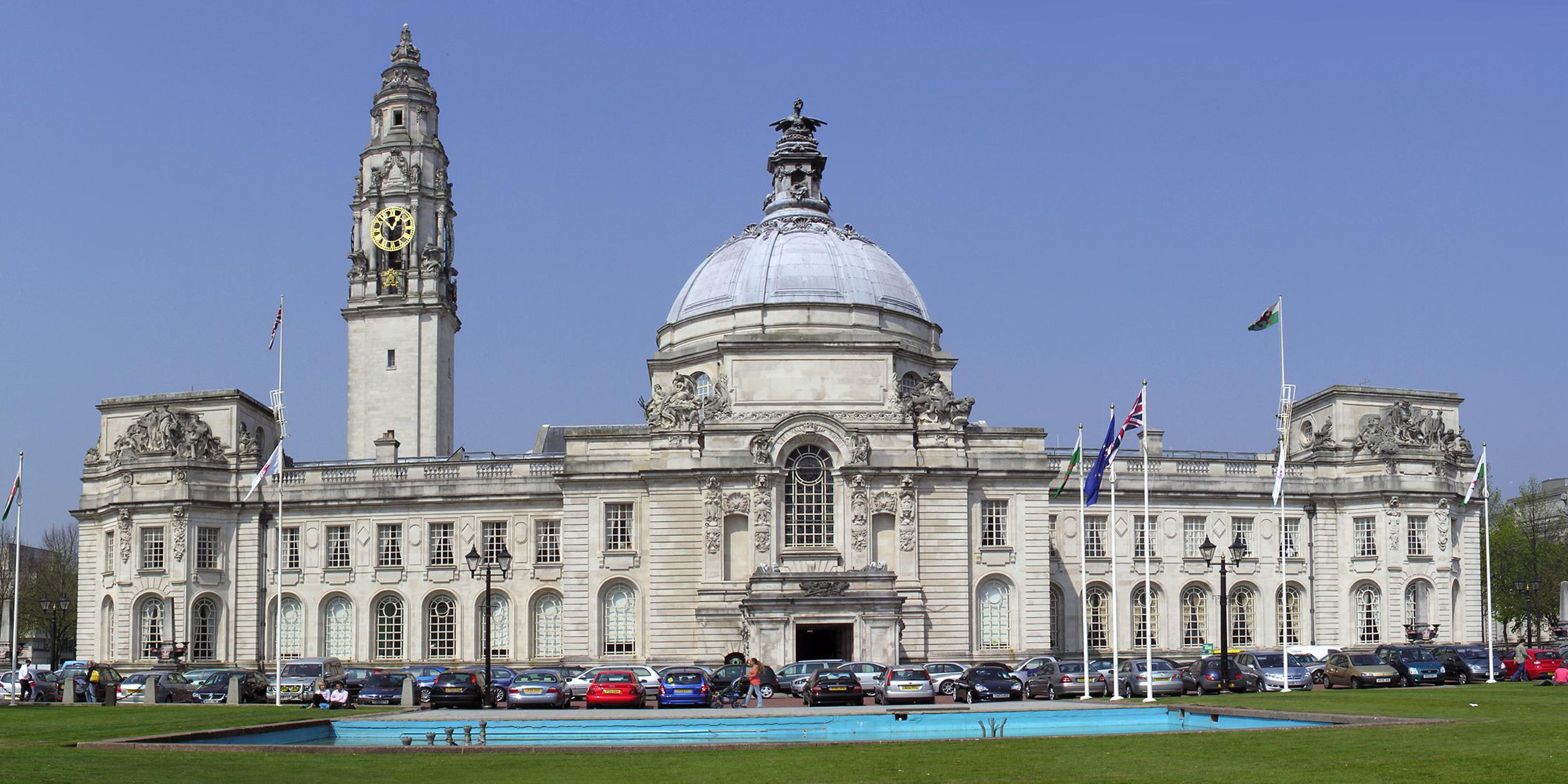
Cardiff City Hall

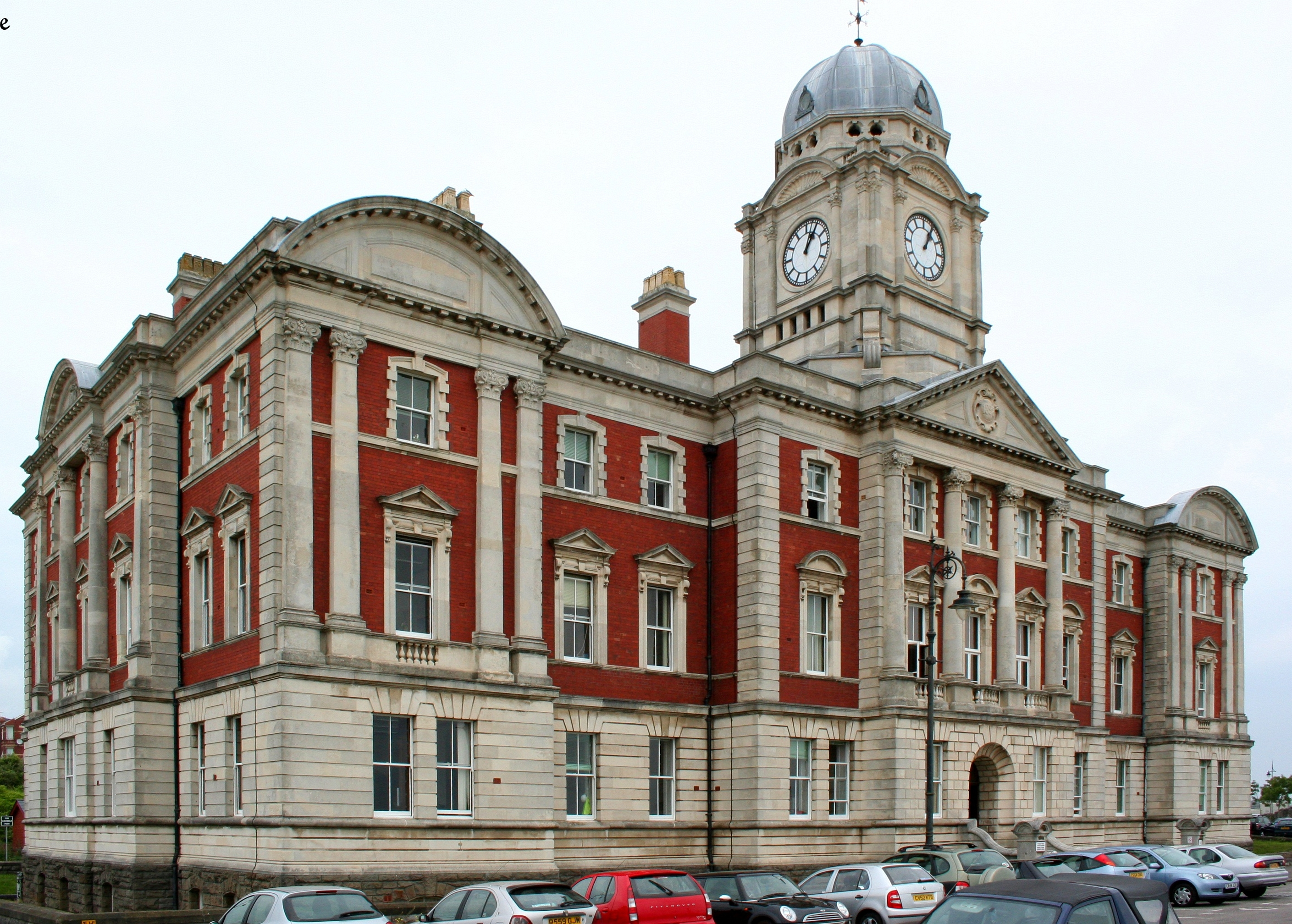
Barry dock offices

Baroque Revival architecture is variously described as Neo-Baroque and Edwardian Baroque, and is paralleled in France by Beaux-Arts architecture. The style is also called "Wrenaissance", acknowledging a debt to Sir Christopher Wren. In Wales the style starts appearing in the 1890s and was used for major public architecture, the newly founded universities and commercial buildings. It reflected the considerable wealth generated in this period, particularly from coal mining and also the growth of Welsh National Identity. The first buildings in the newly planned Cathays Park in Cardiff, described as "the finest civic centre in the British Isles" were the Cardiff Town Hall, later City Hall and the Law Courts, based on plans drawn up in 1897 and built between 1901 and 1905 to designs by Lanchester, Stewart and Rickards. Newman sums up the buildings as "swaggering Baroque .. setting a new standard setting a new standard for the emergence of the Edwardian grand style for public buildings in Great Britain. No Victorian architect had hitherto demonstrated such mastery of Continental Baroque, in this case the Baroque of South Germany and Austria, combined with the Neo-Baroque of Charles Garniers' Paris Opera." The setting is given opulence by the use of Portland Stone for the facades. The National Museum of Wales was added to this grouping in the modified American Neo-Barogue or Beaux-Arts style by the London architects Smith and Brewer and later extended by the Welsh architects T. Alwyn Lloyd and Alex Gordon. The Baroque Revival style was also used for a range of other public buildings, banks and schools and universities. A refined example of this style was used by Alfred Cross for the Edward Davies Building at Aberystwyth University, was the first purpose-built chemical laboratory in a British university. It was opened in 1907 by Lord Asquith and remained a functioning Chemistry Department until 1988. It now serves as the School of Art Building.

F Inigo Thomas also remodelled Ffynone House at Newchapel in Pembrokeshire in a neo-Baroque in 1902–1907 with massive rusticated quoining added to the facade. The house had originally been built by John Nash in 1792–1797.

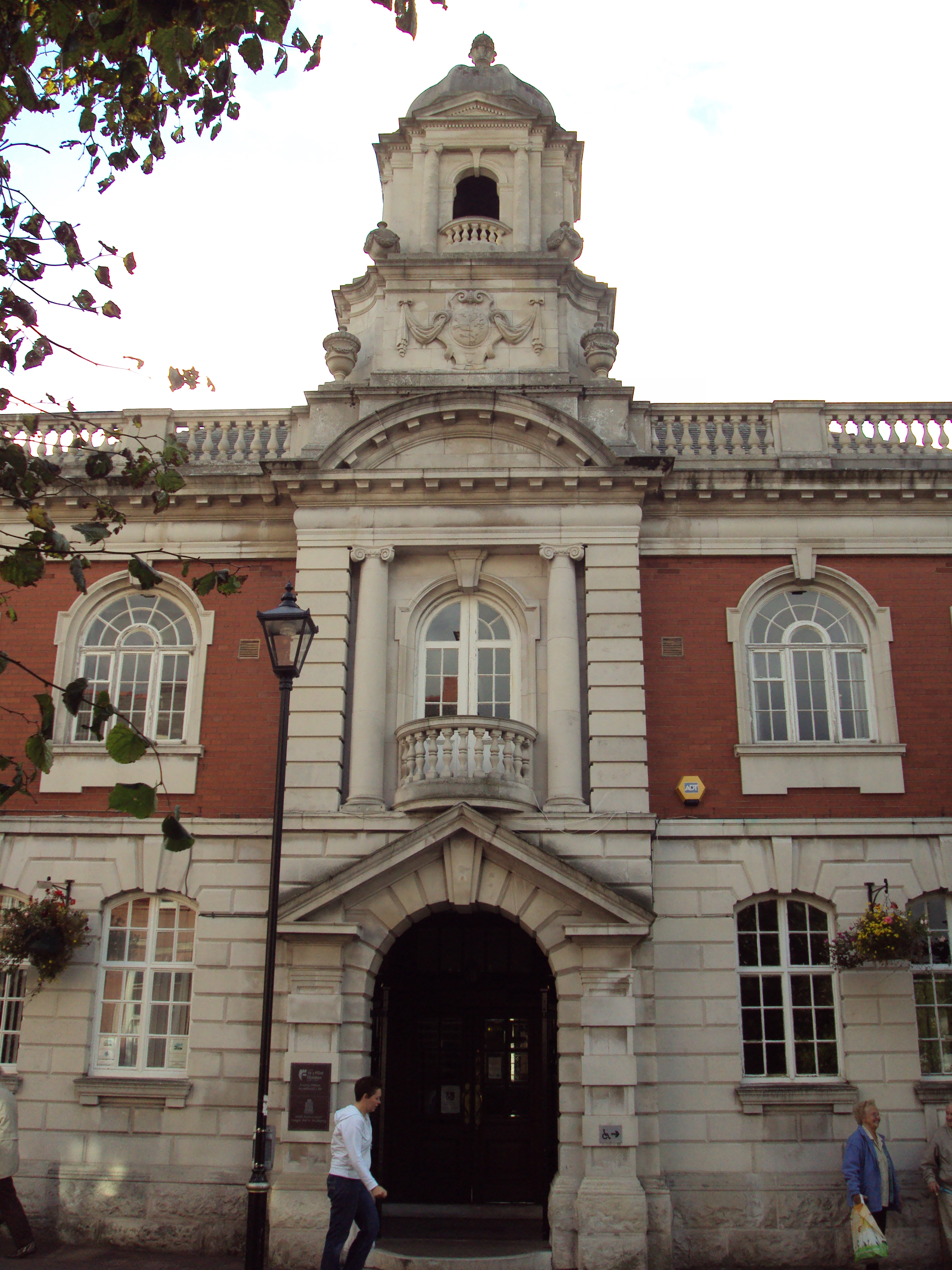
Mold town hall

Barry Town Hall

One of the earliest examples in Wales of the Baroque revival or "Wrenaissance" style to appear in Wales is the Barry Dock Offices built for David Davies as the offices for the Barry Docks & Railway Company, and was part of the scheme for the development of Barry Docks. It was constructed between 1897 and 1900 The architect was Arthur E. Bell. A very similar building, which appears to be copying the Barry Offices on a lesser scale to this is the Stiwt or Rhosllannerchrugog Miners' Institute, close to Wrexham, which was built much later, between 1924 and 1926, by the local architects John Owen and F A Roberts. In Barry the Docks Office was followed in 1903–1908 by the town hall, which was built by the architects Charles E Hutchinson and E Harding Payne in red brick and lavish Bath Stone adjoined by a seven-bay public library with the centre three bays defined by giant Ionic pilasters. Equally ambitious, but on a smaller scale, is the red brick and limestone Town Hall by F A Roberts at Mold in Flintshire.

Baroque revival was also a favoured style for bank architecture. An example is the former North and South Wales Bank, now HSBC in Aberystwyth. This was by Woodfall and Eccles of Liverpool and was built in 1908–1909. Three-bay frontage, with a recessed centre framed columns and topped by a broken curved pediment.

An example of the use of the American Beaux-Arts style is the James Howell & Co. (now House of Fraser) department store in St Mary's Street. This was the work of Sir Percy Thomas in 1928–1930. It makes use of Erectheum Ionic columns with a rounded corner and a memorable relief sculpture frieze designed by Thomas which symbolises the drapery trade.

== Garden villages ==
- Garden Village/Acton Gate, Wrexham. The development of Garden Village began with the purchase of some 200 acres (81 hectares) of land from Sir Foster Cunliffe near to the estate of Acton by the Welsh Town Planning and Housing Trust Limited. The intention was to provide affordable housing to workers coming to Wrexham to work in the expanding industries of coal and iron. Gresford Colliery had recently been opened where it was expected that approximately 3,000 men would be employed in the next two years. A Co-partnership Housing Society was set up in 1913 called Wrexham Tenants Limited, with Lord Kenyon, Mr. David Davies, M.P., and others as Directors to build the houses, while the Trust would build the roads and supervise the development of the estate. The plan was drawn up on an axial layout by the architect G. L. Cunliffe. In the first year, 44 properties were completed; numbers 63–69 Acton Gate, numbers 149–167, Chester Road (originally called Bryn Acton) and Cunliffe Walk. These first house were designed by Sutcliffe and the remaining 205 by Thomas Alwyn Lloyd, architect to the trust.
- Hardwick Garden Village, Chepstow. Built for shipyard workers c. 1913–19 for local shipyard workers by Dunn, Watson and Curtis Green. Similar to other garden villages with symmetrical groupings, with pairs of gables set either together or wide apart and cat slide roofs and concrete block walls, now mainly rendered, and brick chimney stacks.
- 1913 Machynlleth Garden Village, Powys. Thirteen terraced houses.
- 1913–1914 Wrexham Garden Village, 205 houses.
- c. 1914 Llanidloes garden suburb, Powys
- 1915–c. 1925 Barry Garden Suburb, Vale of Glamorgan
- 1920–1923 Rhiwbina Garden Village, Cardiff
- 1936 Trebeferad Land Settlement Scheme, Boverton, Llantwit Major, Vale of Glamorgan. Housing intended to be a new village for miners resettled from the South Wales Coalfield.
- 1936 Fferm Goch, Penllyn, Vale of Glamorgan. 34 Semi-detached houses for unemployed miners.
- 1951 Llwynygog Forest Village, Staylittle, Hafren Forest, Powys. Housing for Forestry Commission workers.

== Inter-war architecture ==
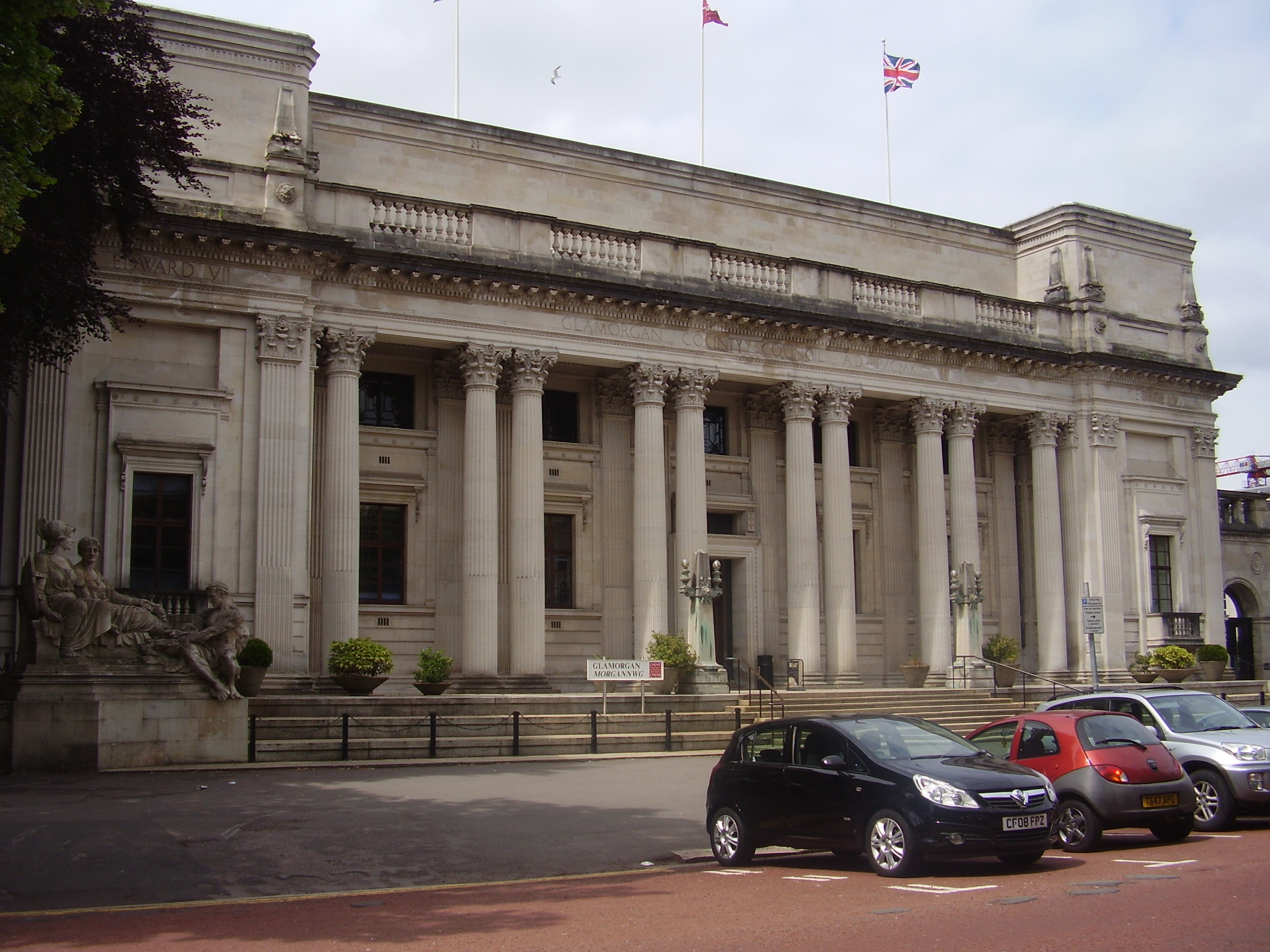
Glamorgan Building, Cathays Park

Hilling, writing in 1976, remarks that in Wales "the interwar period is almost devoid of significantly progressive buildings and the abstract Neo-classicism of those public building that were erected had more in common with the architecture of Albert Speer and the Nazi and Fascist architecture."

The leading Welsh architect of the inter-War years was Sir Percy Thomas.

The Burton menswear store in Abergavenny is a noted example of Art Deco. Built in 1937, it is a Grade II* listed building.

In Ammanford the impressive classical Miner's Welfare Hall, now the Miner's Theatre was built to the designs of J.O. Parry, around 1935. Classical front in brick with giant Ionic columns is mixed with modernist fenestration and detailing

== Art Deco and international Modernist school of architecture ==
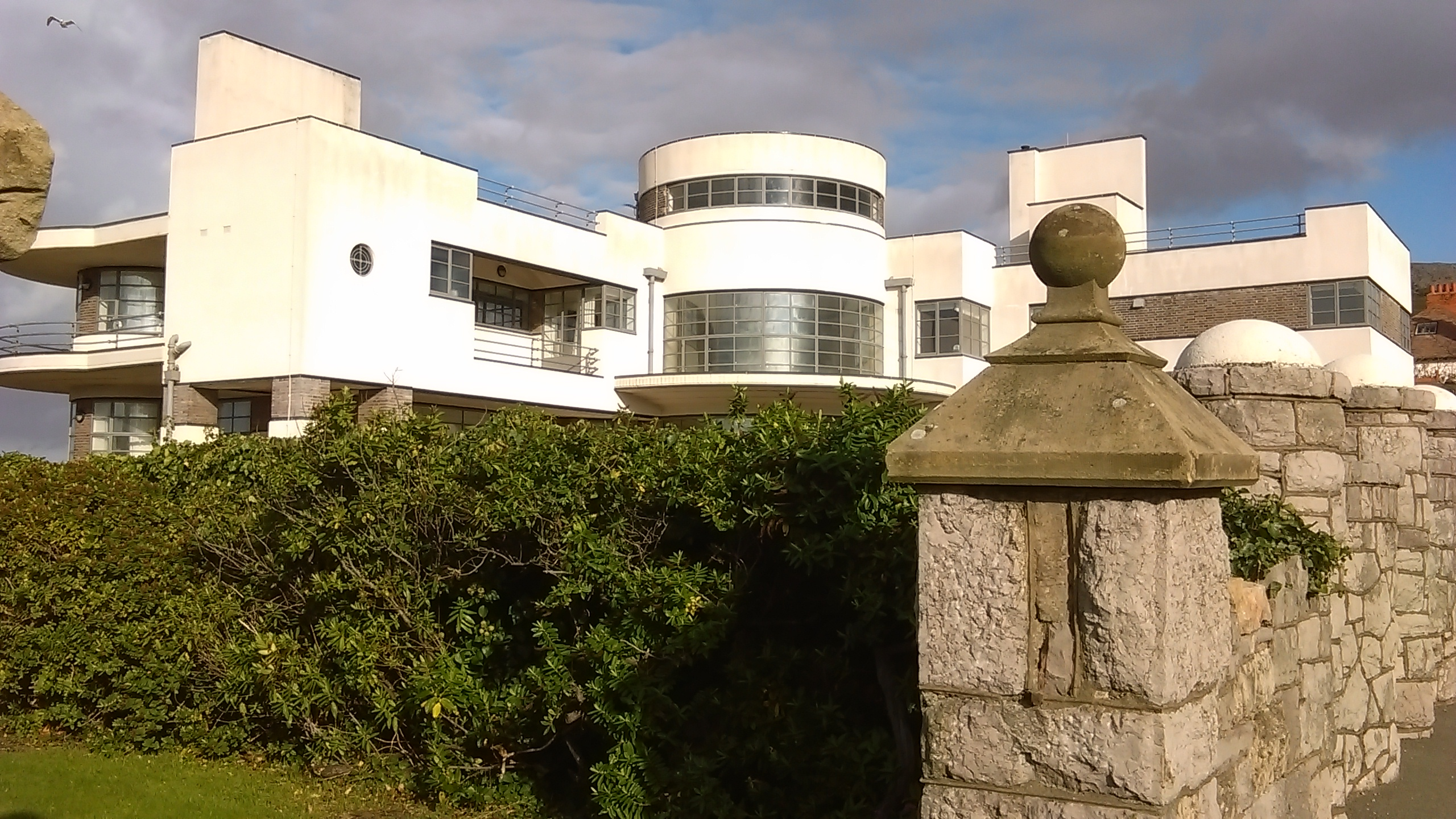
Villa Marina Llandudno

Examples of Art Deco buildings in Wales are limited largely to Cinemas and houses. Possibly the best example of a cinema is the recently closed Pola Cinema in Berriew Street, Welshpool, with its curved frontage and stained glass, which was completed in 1938. An important house in the International Modernist style is the Villa Marina, set on the seafront at Llandudno. It was designed by Harry Weedon in 1936 well known as a cinema architect. It restored in the 2000s.

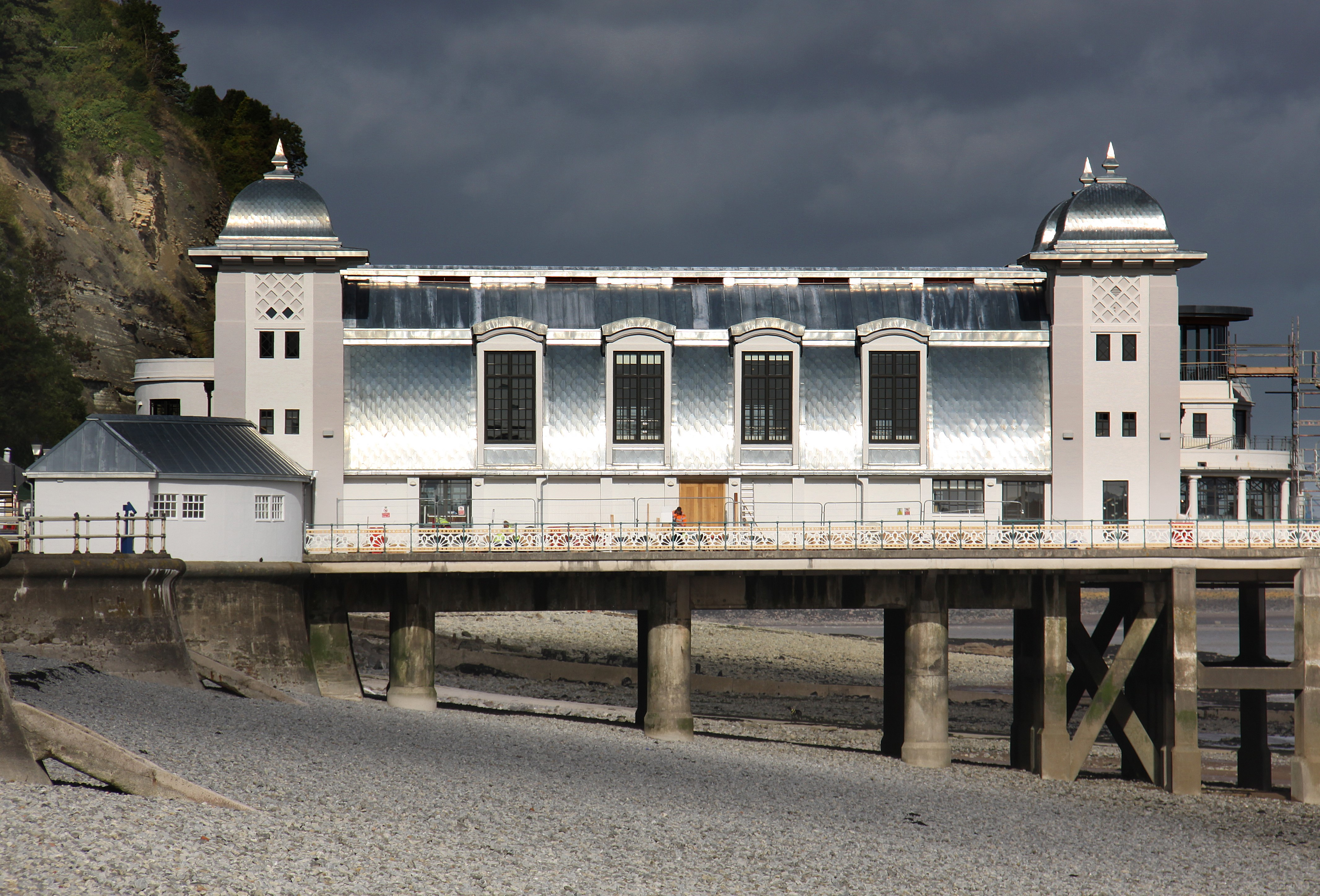
Penarth Pier 2013

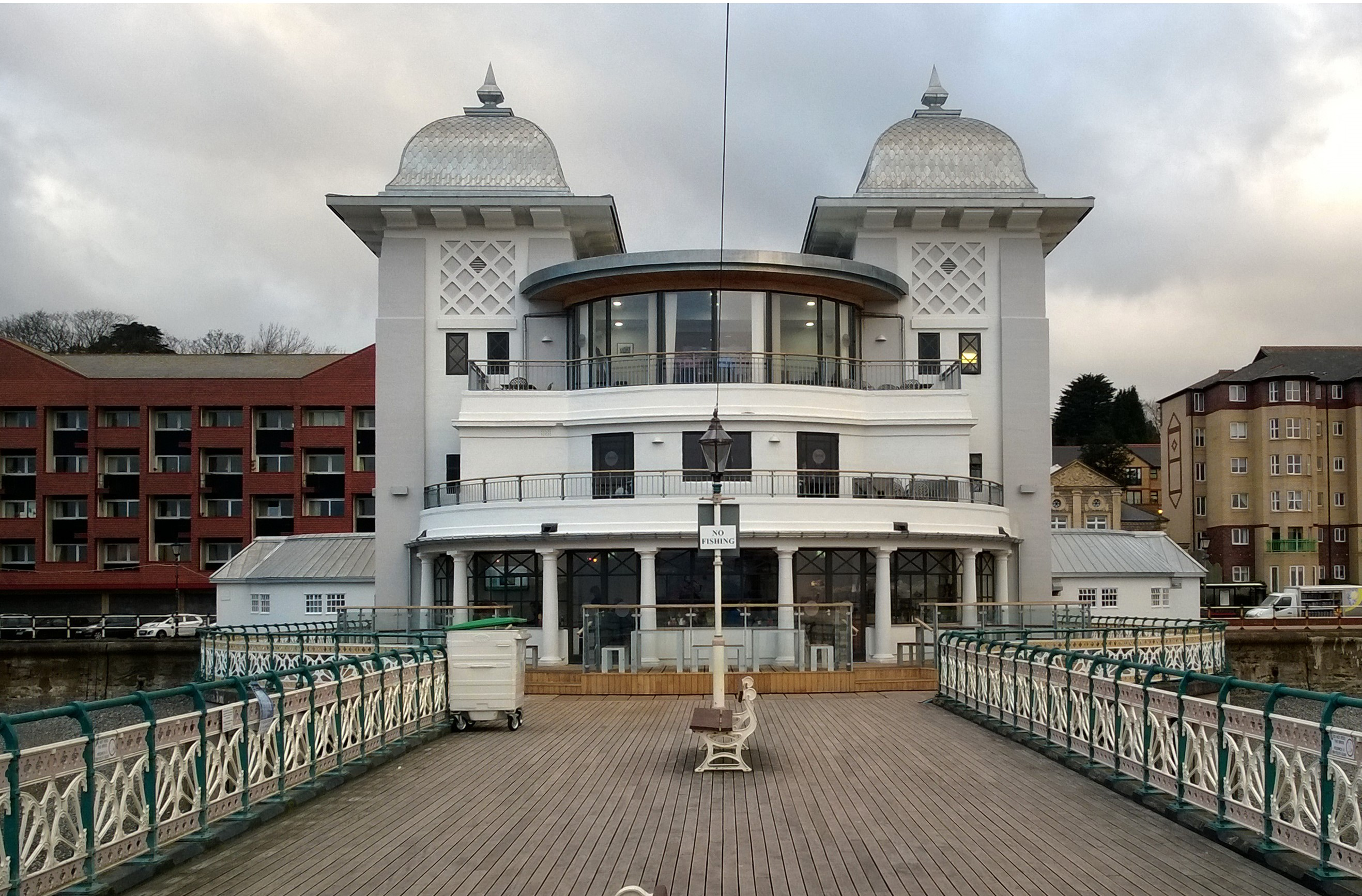
Rear of the pavilion (Penarth Pier) December 2013

An example of Art Deco architecture is Penarth Pier. The original cast-iron pier was designed by H. F. Edwards in 1892–1894. In 1927–1928 a pier pavilion was built in Ferro concrete to designs by L.G. Mouchel and Partners. Mouchel was founded in Briton Ferry (now in Neath Port Talbot) in 1897 by Louis Gustave Mouchel, who arrived in the UK from France with a licence to use the new technique of reinforcing concrete using iron bars that had been developed by François Hennebique. was a pioneer in the use of re-enforced concrete, although the pavilion was built after Mouchel's death. The pavilion has topee shaped dome lets and a semicircular Tuscan colonnade.

An example of Mouchel's use of Ferro-Concrete is the White Bridge at Pontypridd. This was built in 1907, to designs by P R A Willoughby, surveyor to Pontypridd Urban District Council, in association with L G Mouchel & Partners. The contractor was Watkin Williams & Page. Its river span, of 35 metres, was when built, the longest reinforced concrete arch in Britain.

=== The architecture of Clough Williams-Ellis ===
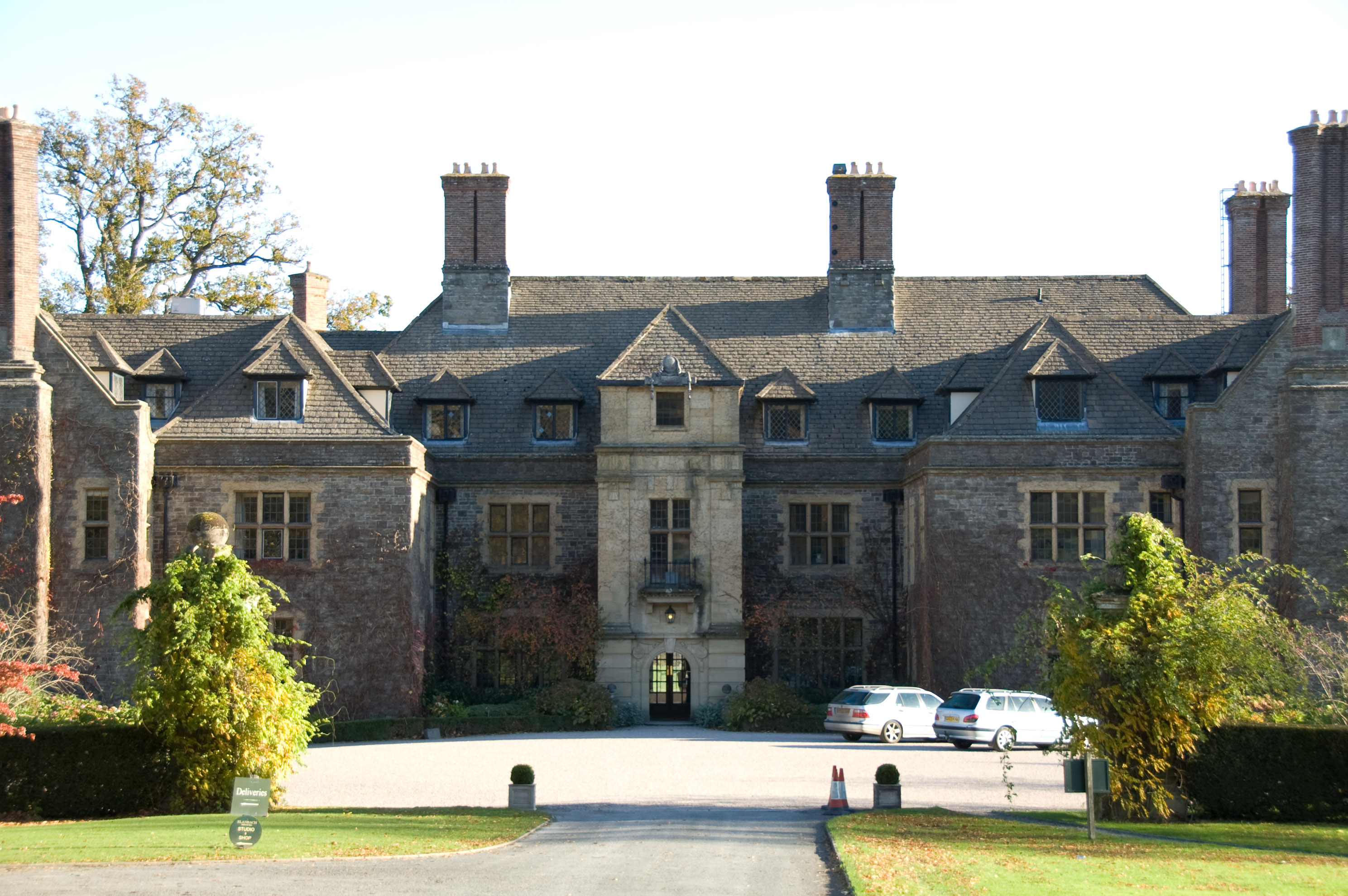
Llangoed Hall

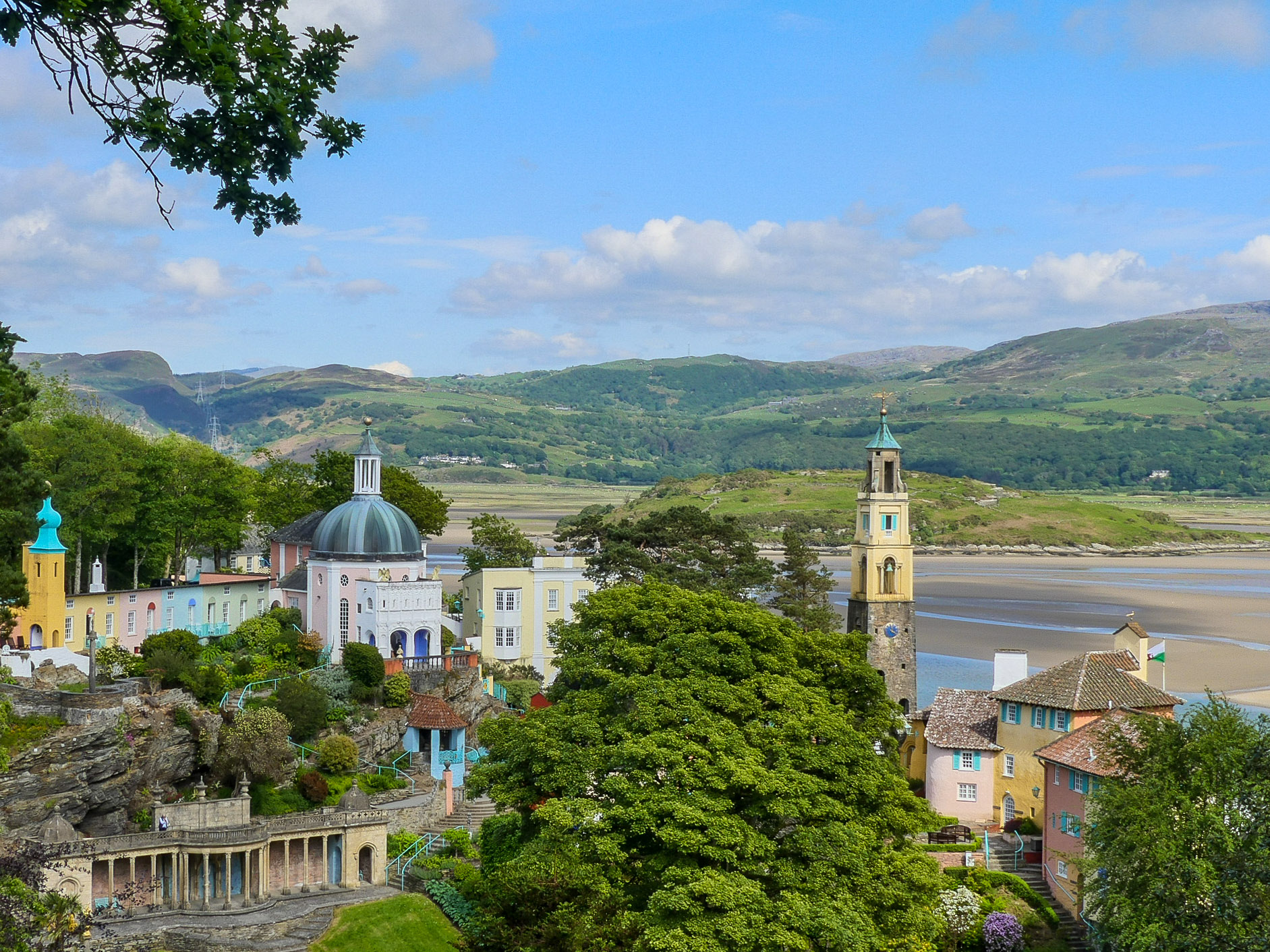
Portmeirion

Clough Williams-Ellis is primarily remembered as the creator of the village of Portmeirion. He became a major figure in the development of Welsh architecture in the first half of the 20th century, working in a variety of styles and designing a wide range of buildings. In 1909 he designed a house in an advanced Arts and Crafts style for Cyril Joynson at Brecfa in Breconshire In 1913–1914 he was responsible for the rebuilding of Llangoed Hall in Breconshire, one of the last country houses to be built before the First World War. It is a mixture of historic styles, but with modern features with elements such as the chimneys derived from the work of Lutyens Other work in Wales by Clough Williams-Ellis includes the Festiniog Memorial Hospital of 1922, Pentrefelin Village Hall, the Conway Fall Cafe. At Aberdaron he designed the Old Post Office in a vernacular style in 1950. An important later commission was the redesign and rebuilding of Nantclwyd Hall in Denbighshire Clough Williams- Ellis was equally capable in working in the Modernist idiom of the interwar years. This is well demonstrated by the recently restored Caffi Moranedd at Criccieth and the now demolished Snowdon Summit Station of 1934, which was demolished in 2007.

However, his more memorable creation in Wales is the capriccio town of Portmeirion on the coast of the Llŷn Peninsula near to Porthmadog. This is notable not only as an architectural composition, but also because Clough Williams-Ellis was able to preserve fragments from other now demolished buildings from Wales and Cheshire. These include the plaster ceiling from Emral Hall The village was built in two phases, one before 1939 and the other 1954–1976, with Williams-Ellis designing most of the buildings.

== Post-war architecture in Wales ==
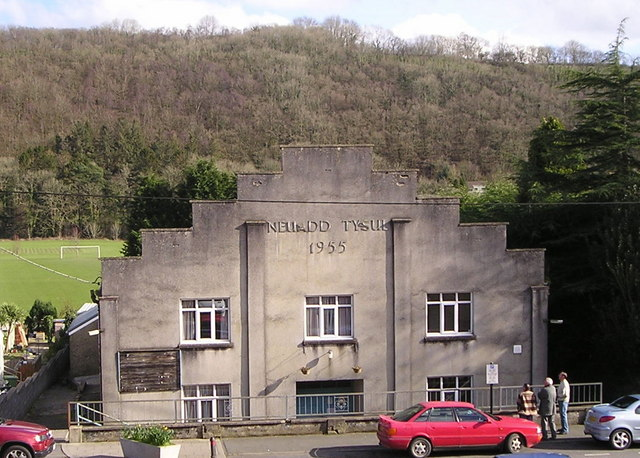
Neuadd Tysul, Llandysul, 1955

In the years following the 2nd World War resources mainly went on the provision of housing. During these years of austerity some public buildings were constructed including the village hall or Neuadd Tysul at Llandysul in Ceredigion of 1955. This was the work of John Davies the county surveyor. The concrete frontage has been enlivened by the crow stepped gables and the Festival of Britain lettering.

During the 1960s local Government started to commission some notable buildings. Foremost amongst these is the Wrexham Swimming Baths of 1965–1967 by F.D. Williamson associates of Bridgend. The baths have a giant parabolic roof covers three swimming pool with the glassed end with the diving boards rising to four stories. These architects were also responsible for the Sport Wales National Centre of 1971 in Sophia Gardens, Cardiff. In Brecon the County Library of 1969 by J.A. McRobbie, is a well designed Brutalist building in Ship Street, but its position is hemmed in and led to destruction of other older buildings in the street

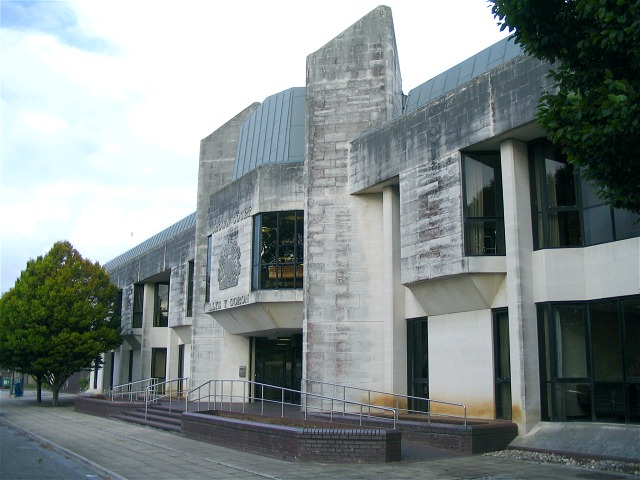
Swansea Crown Court

In the Post War Period many major building projects started to be awarded to Welsh architectural firms. Leading firms were Percy Thomas Partnership and Alex Gordon and Partners in the south, and Colwyn Foulkes Partnership and Bowen Dann Davies of Colwyn Bay in the north. The Percy Thomas Partnership lost its identity when it was forced into liquidation in 2004. It has since become part of Capita Symonds The first true skyscraper in Wales was the Capital Tower in Cardiff. It was completed in 1969–1970 and providing 190,000 ft^{2} (18,000 m^{2}) of floor space over 25 storeys. It was originally known as Pearl House and was designed by the London firm Sir John Burnet and Partners which became Burnet Tait & Lorne.

=== 1980–2000 ===
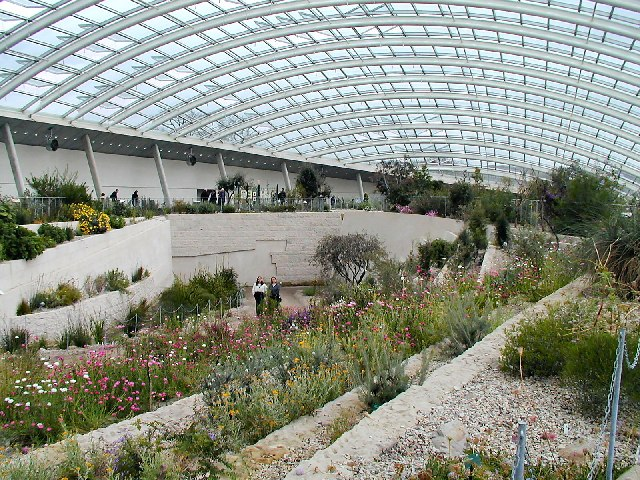
Inside the Great Glasshouse, designed by Foster and Partners.

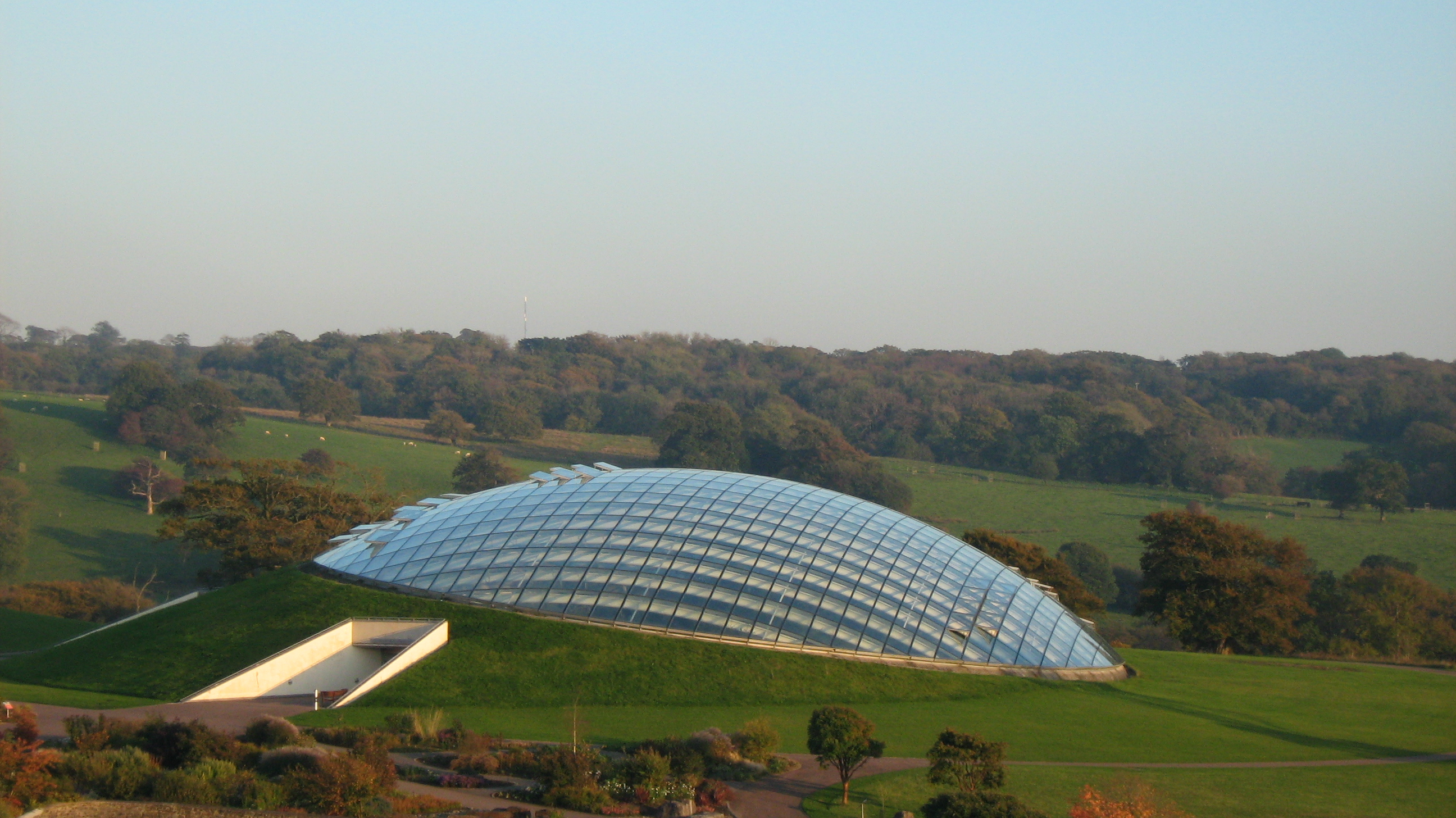
Great Glass House

A notable project at the end of the 20th century was the creation of the National Botanic Garden of Wales. The most striking feature of this was the Great Glasshouse. Designed 1995–1996 by Foster and Partners and built 1997–1999. This is the largest single span glasshouse in the world 110 metres long and 60 metres wide. The roof, an "elliptical torus", is carried on twenty-four elliptical arches and covers 3,500 square metres, and provides Wales with a building of international note.

== 21st-century architecture ==
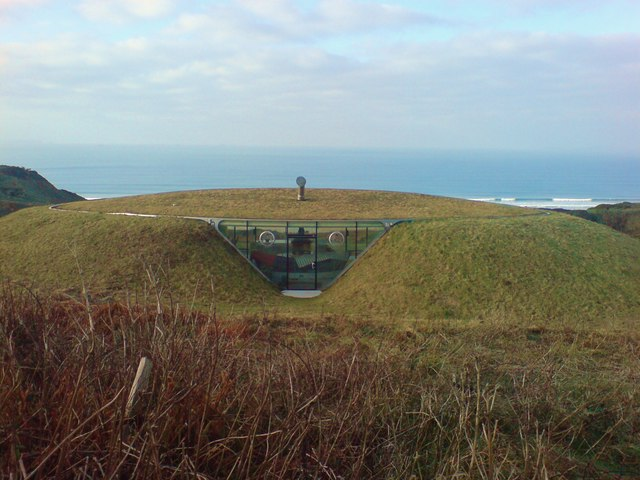
Malator, Pembrokeshire

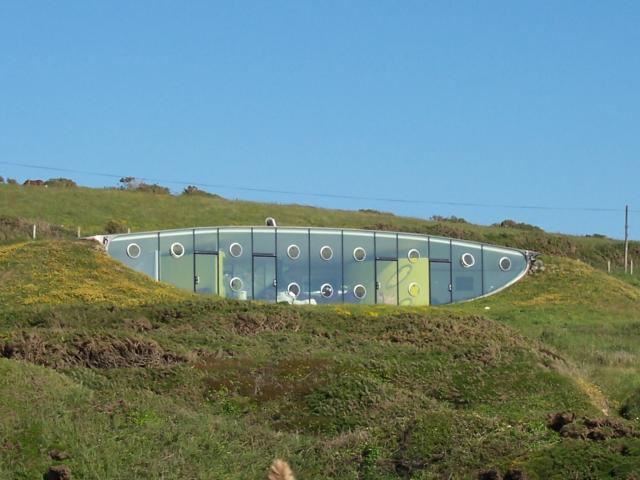
Malator (known locally as "Teletubby House")

Ushering in the 21st-century architecture in Wales was Jan Kaplicky's of Future Systems Malator at Nolton in Pembrokeshire. The site overlooks St Bride's bay and is within the Pembrokeshire Coast National Park. The house was built in 1998 and is a notable example of Eco architecture. It is excavated into the sloping ground and is turf roofed. The house appears as a low hillock with only a metal flue rising from the grass. The seaward elevation is entirely of glass. Steel framed construction with a ring beam that supports the roof.

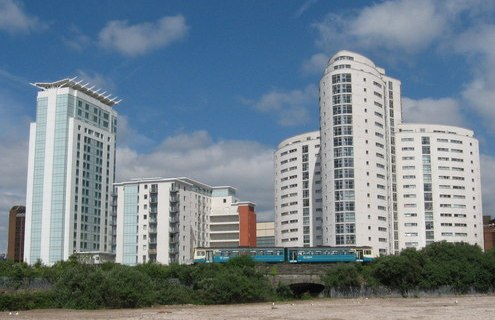
Meridian Gate and Altolusso, Cardiff

=== Tower blocks ===
Currently the tallest building in Wales is The Tower, Meridian Quay at Swansea, which is 107 meters high and completed in 2010. The tower has 29 storeys, double the number of the previous tallest building in Swansea, the BT Tower. Most of The Tower houses residential apartments. The design was by Latitude Architects and elliptical shape of the building is reminiscent of the work of the Austrian architect Heinz Tesar. The only other high rise buildings in Wales are in Cardiff.

=== Wales Millennium Centre ===
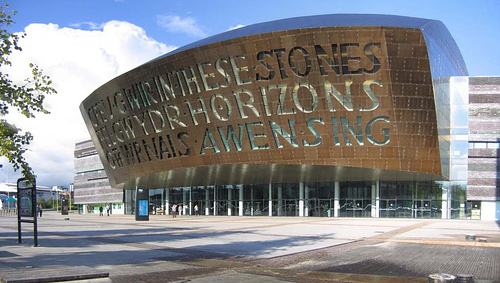
Cardiff Bay Welsh Millennium Centre

The most striking building of 21st-century Wales is the Wales Millennium Centre on Cardiff Bay. The centre was designed by Jonathan Adams, of local practice Percy Thomas Architects Wales Millennium Centre (Welsh: Canolfan Mileniwm Cymru) is an arts centre located in the Cardiff Bay area of Cardiff. The site covers a total area of 4.7 acres (1.9 ha).

The Centre comprises one large theatre and two smaller halls with shops, bars and restaurants. It houses the national orchestra and opera, dance, theatre and literature companies, a total of eight arts organisations in residence. It is also home to the Cardiff Bay Visitor Centre. The main theatre, the Donald Gordon Theatre, has 1,897 seats, the BBC Hoddinott Hall 350 and the Weston Studio Theatre 250.

=== The Senedd ===
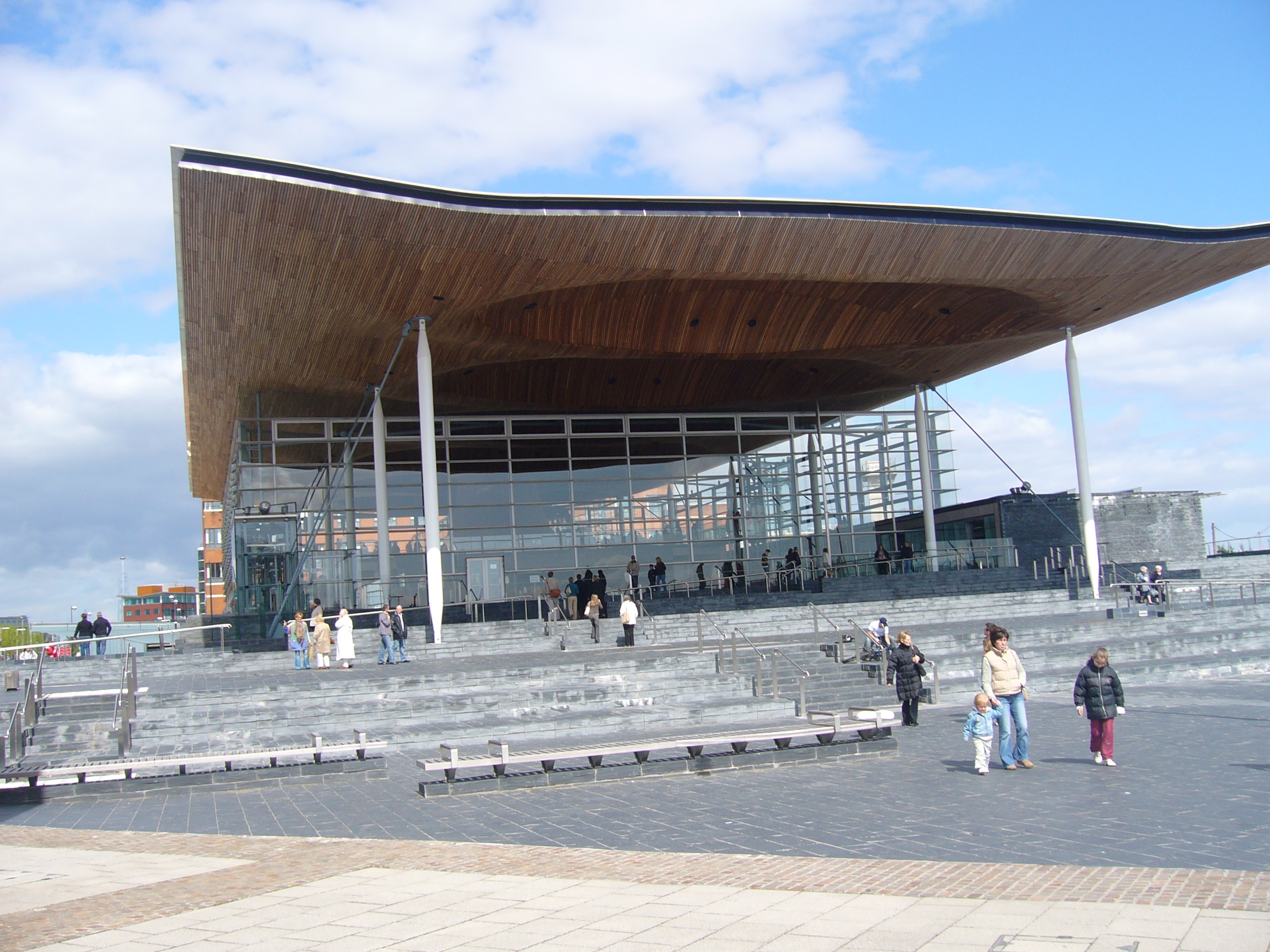
Senedd Wales gallery

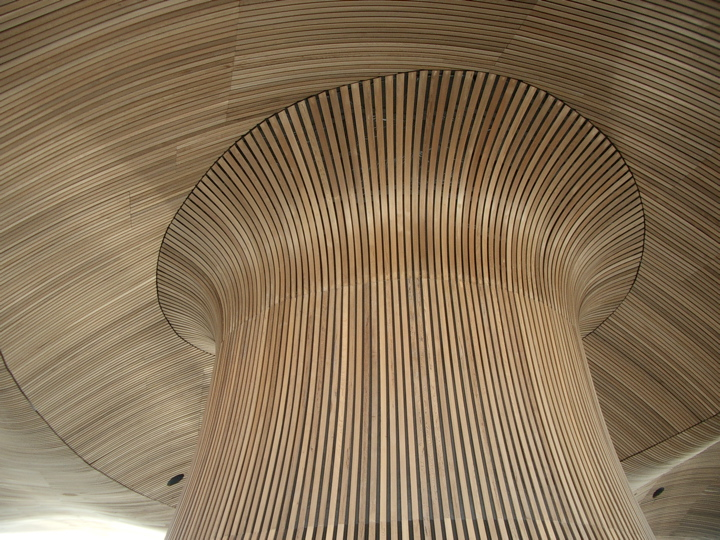
Welsh Assembly column interior

The Senedd building houses the debating chamber and committee rooms of the Senedd (Welsh Parliament; Welsh: Senedd Cymru). It was completed in 2006. The building faces south west over Cardiff Bay, it has a glass façade around the entire building and is dominated by a steel roof and wood ceiling. It has three floors, the first and second floors are accessible is to the public and the ground floor is a private area for officials. The building was designed to be as open and accessible as possible, the architects, the Richard Rogers Partnership (RRP) said "The building was not to be an insular, closed edifice. Rather it would be a transparent envelope, looking outwards to Cardiff Bay and beyond, making visible the inner workings of the Assembly and encouraging public participation in the democratic process." The main area in the building is the debating chamber, called the Siambr, including a public viewing gallery. Other areas of the building are the Neuadd, which is the main reception area on the first floor and the Oriel on the second floor. The three committee rooms and the Cwrt are on the ground floor.

== See also ==
- List of Welsh Architects
- Architecture of Cardiff
- Building stones of Wales
- Buildings associated with Owain Glyndŵr
- List of castles in Wales
- Richard Clough

== Literature ==
=== General literature ===
- Alfrey, J. (2001), Rural Building in Nineteenth- Century North Wales: The Role of the Great Estate, Archaeologia Cambrensis. Vol 147, 1998, 199–216.
- Brodie, Antonia (ed.) Directory of British Architects, 1834–1914: Vols.1- 2, British Architectural Library, Royal Institute of British Architects, 2001
- Barnwell, E L. (1867), Domestic Architecture of South Pembrokeshire, Archaeologia Cambrensis, Vol 13, 193–204, 363–374 & Vol 14,1868, 70–84.
- Dineley, T. (intro. R. W. Banks) (1888), The Account of the Official Progress of his Grace Henry...Duke of Beaufort (Lord President of the Council in Wales and Lord Warden of the Marches) through Wales in 1684 Blades, East and Blades, London.
- Emery, A. (2000) Greater Medieval Houses of England and Wales, 1300–1500: Volume 2, East Anglia, Central England and Wales: East Anglia, Central England and Wales Vol 2. Cambridge University Press. ISBN 9780521581318
- Colvin, Howard (1995). A Biographical Dictionary of British Architects 1600–1840 (3rd ed.). Yale University Press. ISBN 9780300060911.
- Hilling, J. B. (1976), The Historic Architecture of Wales: An Introduction, UWP. 2nd ed (2018),The Architecture of Wales: From the First to the Twenty-First Century, UWP. ISBN 978-1-78683-286-3
- Lloyd, T. (1986). 2nd ed., The Lost houses of Wales, Save.
- Seaborne, M. (1992), Schools in Wales 1500–1900: Asocial and Architectural History. Gee & Son, Denbigh.
- Smith, p. (1990), Houses of the Welsh Countryside, 2nd Edition, 1988, HMSO/ RCAHMW
- Smith, p. (1990), "Rural Building in Wales" in Barley M.W. (ed), The Buildings of the Countryside 1500–1750, Vol 5, of Chapters from the Agrarian History of England and Wales (ed. Thirsk J.) Cambridge University Press, pp. 177–395. A major source for Welsh architecture, with much that is not covered in Houses of the Welsh Countryside.
- Smith, Peter (1988). Houses of the Welsh Countryside: a Study in Historical Geography (2nd ed.). London, UK: The Royal Commission on Ancient and Historical Monuments in Wales. ISBN 9780113000128.
- Suggett, R. and Stevenson, G. (2010), Introducing Houses of the Welsh Countryside. Cyflwyno Cartrefi Cefn Gwlad Cymru. Y Lolfa/ RCAHMW.
- Tree, M. & Baker, M. (2008), Forgotten Welsh Houses, Hendre House Publishing.
- Thurlby, M. (2005), Romanesque Architecture and Sculpture in Wales, Logaston Press.
- Turner, Rick C. (2008). Plas Mawr, Conwy (Revised ed.). Cardiff, UK: Cadw. ISBN 9781857602425.
- Turner, Rick C. (1995). "Robert Wynn and the Building of Plas Mawr, Conwy". National Library of Wales Journal. 29 (2): 177–209.

=== County and Area surveys ===
- Haslam R. et al. (2009), The Buildings of Wales: Gwynedd, Yale University Press.
- Hubbard, Edward (1986). Buildings of Wales: Clwyd. Harmondsworth: Penguin. ISBN 978-0-14-071052-6.
- Lloyd, Thomas; Orbach, Julian; Scourfield, Robert (2006). Carmarthenshire and Ceredigion: The Buildings of Wales. Yale University Press. ISBN 9780300101799.
- Lloyd T et al. (2003), "Pembrokeshire: The Buildings of Wales" Yale University Press ISBN 0300101783
- Lowe R. (2002), Lost Houses in and around Wrexham, Landmark Publishing.
- Morris B (1998), Old Gower Farmhouses and their Families. The Gower Society. 1998
- Newman, John (1995), The Buildings of Wales: Glamorgan, Penguin Books.
- Newman, John (2000), The Buildings of Wales: Gwent/Monmouthshire. Penguin Books.
- Royal Commission on the Ancient and Historical Monuments of Wales (1911), Inventory of the Ancient Monuments in Wales and Monmouth I – County of Montgomery.
- RCAHMW (1981), Glamorgan: The Greater Houses HMSO. ISBN 0117007544
- RCAHMW (1914), Inventory of Denbighshire
- Scourfield R. and Haslam R. (2013), The Buildings of Wales: Powys; Montgomeryshire, Radnorshire and Breconshire, Yale University Press.

=== Interiors and individual houses ===
- Kightly, C. (2005), Living Rooms: Interior Decoration in Wales 400–1960. CADW.
- Davies, K. Artisan Art: Vernacular wall paintings in the Welsh Marches, 1550–1650, Logaston Press. ISBN 978 1904396 93 2
- Siddons, M.P. (2000), The Heraldic Carvings at Gregynog, Montgomeryshire Collections, Vol. 88, 53–62.
- Turner, R. C. (1995), Robert Wynn and the Building of Plas Mawr, Conwy. National Library of Wales Journal. 29 (2): 177–209.
- Turner, R. C. (2008), Plas Mawr, Conwy (Revised ed.). Cardiff, UK: Cadw. ISBN 9781857602425.

=== Building materials ===
- Dillon, M. J. (1985), Bricks Tiles and Terracotta from Wrexham and Ruabon An Exhibition on one of the major industries of the Wrexham area. Grosvenor Museum, Chester. ISBN 0903235129.
- Stratton, M. (1993), The Terracotta Revival : Building Innovation and the Image of the Industrial City in Britain and North America. London : Gollancz.

=== Vernacular architecture ===
- Alcock, N., Barnwell, p. and Cherry, M. (eds) (2020), Cruck Building: A Survey, Rewley House Studies in the Historic Environment, 11, Shaun Tyas Donington, Lincolnshire. ISBN 9781907730795
- Britnell, W. J. (ed) (2001), Ty-Mawr, Castle Caereinion, Montgomeryshire Collections, Volume 89.
- Brooksby, H. (1968–1973), The Houses of Radnorshire Transactions of the Radnorshire Society.
- Cherry, M. and Thompson, p. (2020), The Afterlife of Cruck Houses: Modernisation and Obsolescence in North Wales. in Alcock, N., Barnwell, p. and Cherry, M. (eds), pp. 323–358.
- Dunn, M. and Suggett, R. (2014) Darganfod Tai Hanesyddol Eryri / Discovering the Historic Houses of Snowdonia, RCAHMW ISBN 978-1-871184-53-2
- Fox, C. & Lord Raglan (1951–1954), Monmouthshire Houses, National Museum of Wales, Cardiff. 3 Vols.
- Jones, S.R. and Smith, J.T. (1966–1967), The Houses of Breconshire Brycheiniog, 1963,
- Hughes, H. (1898), Old Houses in the neighbourhood of Llansilin, Archaeologia Cambrensis, 5th series, vol 15, pp. 154–77.
- Lowe, J. (1993), Welsh Country Workers Housing 1775–1875, National Museum of Wales, Cardiff.
- Romilly, Allen J. (1902), Old Farmhouses with Round Chimneys near St Davids, Archaeologia Cambrensis, pp. 1–24.
- Smith, p. (1998), Historic Timber Construction in Wales in Stenning D.F. & Andrews D.D. (eds) Regional Variation in Timber-Framed Building in England and Wales Down to 1550, The Proceedings of the 1994, Cressing Conference, Essex County Council, Chelmsford. pp. 88–103.
- Smith, p. (2001), Ty-Mawr and the Aisle Truss Houses of Wales, in Britnell W. Ty-Mawr Castle Caerenion, Montgomeryshire Collections Vol. 89 2001, pp. 201–18
- Smith, p. and Owen C.E.V. (1965–6), A short architectural note on Ystradfaelog, the Bryn and Lower Gwestydd , Montgomeryshire Collections Vol. 59, pp. 102–111.
- Suggett, R. (2005), Houses and History in the March of Wales: Radnorshire 1400–1800 RCAHMW
- Suggett, R. (2020), Crucks in Wales, in "Alcock N, Barnwell P and Cherry M (eds)", pp. 274–299.
- RCAHMW (1988), Farmhouses and Cottages Glamorgan Inventory: Vol.4 part 2.
- Wiliam, E. (1988), Home-made Homes: Dwellings of the rural poor in Wales, National Museum of Wales.
- Wiliam, E. (2010). The Welsh Cottage. Building traditions of the rural poor 1750–1900 RCAHMW.

=== Agricultural buildings ===
- Robinson, J. M. (1983), Georgian Model Farms: A Study of Decorative and Model Farm Buildings in the Age of Improvement 1700–1846. Oxford.
- Wade-Martins, S. (2002), The English Model Farm – Building the Agricultural Ideal, 1700–1914 English Heritage/Windgather Press.
- Wiliam, E. (1986) Historical Farm Buildings of Wales, John Donald, Edinburgh

=== Industrial buildings and transport ===
- Hughes, S. (1990), The Brecon Forest Tramroad: The Archaeology of an Early Railway System, RCAHMW.
- Hughes, S. (2000), Copperopolis: Landscapes of the Early Industrial Period in Swansea
- Lowe, J. (1985), Welsh Industrial Workers Housing 1775–1875, National Museum of Wales.

=== Architects ===
- Crook, M. (ed) (1981), The Strange Genius of William Burges: Art-Architect, 1827–1881. National Museum of Wales. ISBN 0720002346.
- Darby, M. (1997), John Pollard Seddon (Catalogue of Architectural Drawings in the Victoria & Albert Museum).
- Davey, Elaine (2013) A National Architect? :The Percy Thomas Practice and Welsh national identity, Cardiff School of Planning and Geography Thesis submitted for the Degree of Doctor of Philosophy
- Davey, Elaine and Thomas, Huw (2014) 'Chief Creator of Modern Wales: The neglected legacy of Percy Thomas. North American Journal of Welsh Studies, Vol 9
- Haslam, R. (1996), Clough Williams-Ellis, RIBA Drawings Monograph No2. ISBN 1854904302
- Jenkins, D.E. (n.d ? 2014), The Penson Dynasty: Building on the Welsh Border, 1822–1859. Oswestry Civic Society.
- Mansbridge, Michael (1991), John Nash: A complete catalogue, Phaidon Press
- Suggett, R. (1995), John Nash Architect in Wales, Royal Commission on the Ancient and Historical Monuments of Wales,
- Voelcker, A. (2011), Herbert Luck North: Arts and Crafts Architecture for Wales, RCAHMW.
