= Clwyd =

Preserved county of Wales

Coordinates: 53.09°N 3.27°W

- Clwyd shown within Wales as a preserved county 1974–96 county boundaries (as districts) within Wales
- Area
  - 2024: 2,906 km²
- Population
  - 2024: 507,205
- History
  - Created: 1974
  - Abolished: 1996
  - Succeeded by: Flintshire; Wrexham County Borough; Denbighshire; Parts of Conwy County Borough; Parts of Powys
- Status: Non-metropolitan county (1974–1996) Preserved county (1996–)
- Government: Clwyd County Council
  - HQ: Shire Hall, Mold

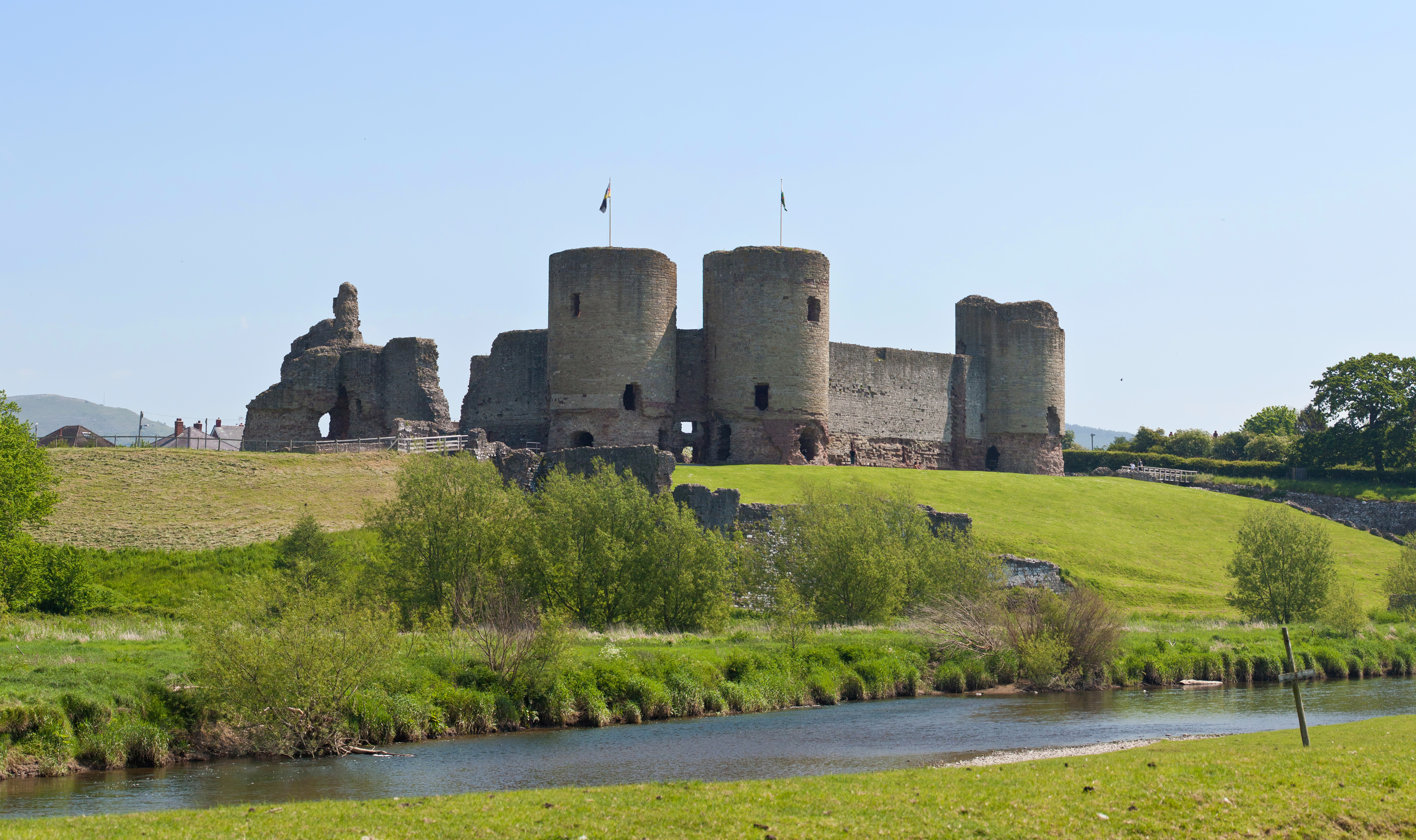
Rhuddlan Castle

Clwyd (/ˈkluːɪd/ KLOO-id, Welsh: [ˈklʊɨd]) is a preserved county of Wales, situated in the north-east corner of the country; it is named after the River Clwyd, which runs through the area. To the north lies the Irish Sea, with the English ceremonial counties of Cheshire to the east and Shropshire to the south-east. Powys and Gwynedd lie to the south and west respectively. Clwyd also shares a maritime boundary with Merseyside along the River Dee. Between 1974 and 1996, a slightly different area had a county council, with local government functions shared with six district councils. In 1996, Clwyd was abolished, and the new principal areas of Conwy County Borough, Denbighshire, Flintshire and Wrexham County Borough were created; under this reorganisation, "Clwyd" became a preserved county, with the name being retained for certain ceremonial functions.

This area of north-eastern Wales has been settled since prehistoric times; the Romans built a fort beside a ford on the River Conwy, and the Normans and Welsh disputed the territory. They built their castles at strategic locations as they advanced and retreated, but in the end England prevailed, and Edward I conquered the country in 1282. The Laws in Wales Act 1535 incorporated Wales under the English Crown and made it subject to English law.

Traditionally, agriculture was the mainstay of the economy of this part of Wales, but with the Industrial Revolution, the North Wales Coalfield was developed and parts of eastern Clwyd around the Dee estuary and Wrexham became industrialised. The advent of the railway running from Chester along the North Wales coast in the mid-19th century made it easy for urban dwellers from Lancashire and Cheshire to visit the seaside towns of North Wales.

== History ==
North Wales has had human settlements since prehistoric times. By the time the Romans reached Britain, the area that is now Clwyd was occupied by the Celtic Deceangli tribe. They lived in a chain of hill forts running through the Clwydian Range and their tribal capital was Canovium, at an important crossing of the River Conwy. This fell to the Romans, who built their own fort here, in about AD 75; and the whole of Wales was soon under their control. After the Roman departure from Britain in AD 410, the successor states of Gwynedd and Powys controlled the area. From about 800 onwards, a series of dynastic marriages led to Rhodri Mawr inheriting the kingdoms of Gwynedd and Powys. After his death, this kingdom was divided among his three sons and further strife followed: not only Welsh battles were fought, but there were also many raids by Danes and Saxons.

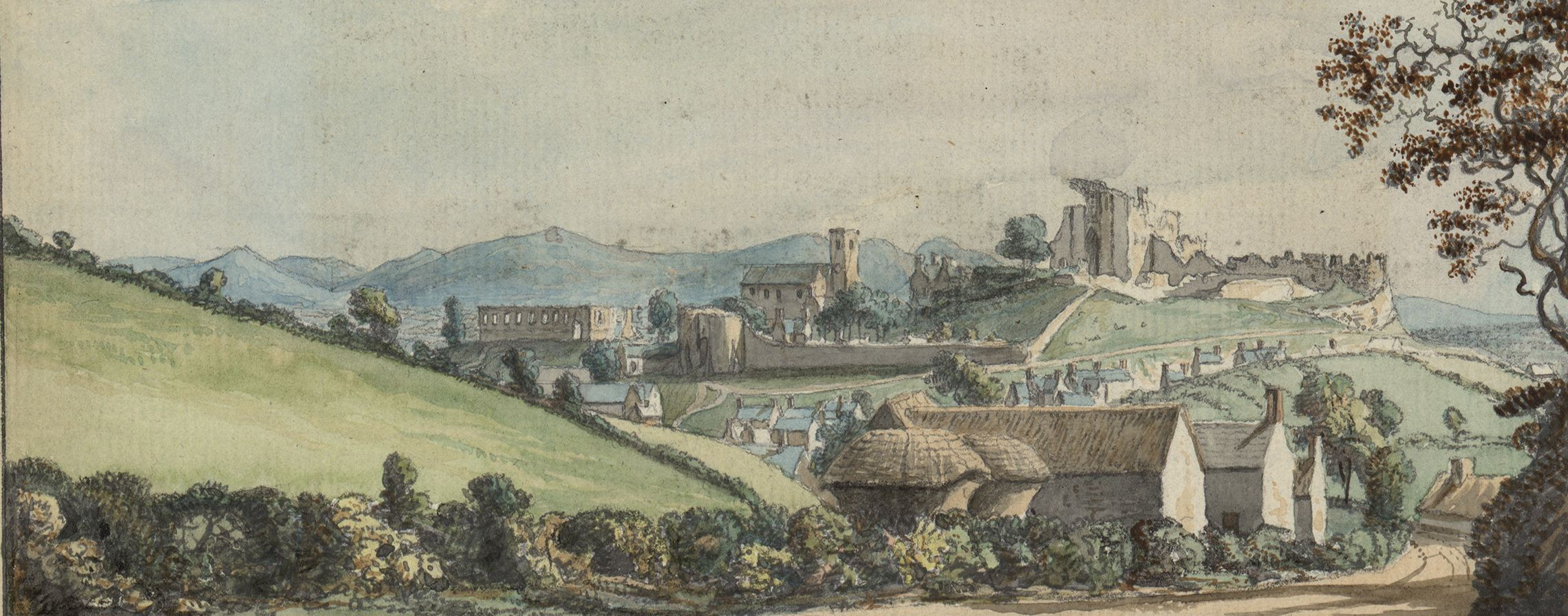
Denbigh in about 1775, from A tour in Wales by Thomas Pennant

The Normans' conquest of England at first had little effect on North Wales. This was to change as the city of Chester on the River Dee became the base for successive campaigns against the country in the 13th century. The coastal plain of Clwyd was the main invasion route, and a number of castles were built there to assist these advances. The castles at Flint and Rhuddlan date from this period, and were the first to be built by Edward I of England in North Wales during his successful conquest in 1282. After this, the rule of the Welsh princes was at an end and Wales was annexed to England. This area was known as the Principality of Wales from 1216 to 1536. From 1301, the Crown's lands in north and west Wales formed part of the appanage of England's heir apparent, who was given the title "Prince of Wales". Under the Laws in Wales Act 1535, Wales became permanently incorporated under the English Crown and subject to English law.

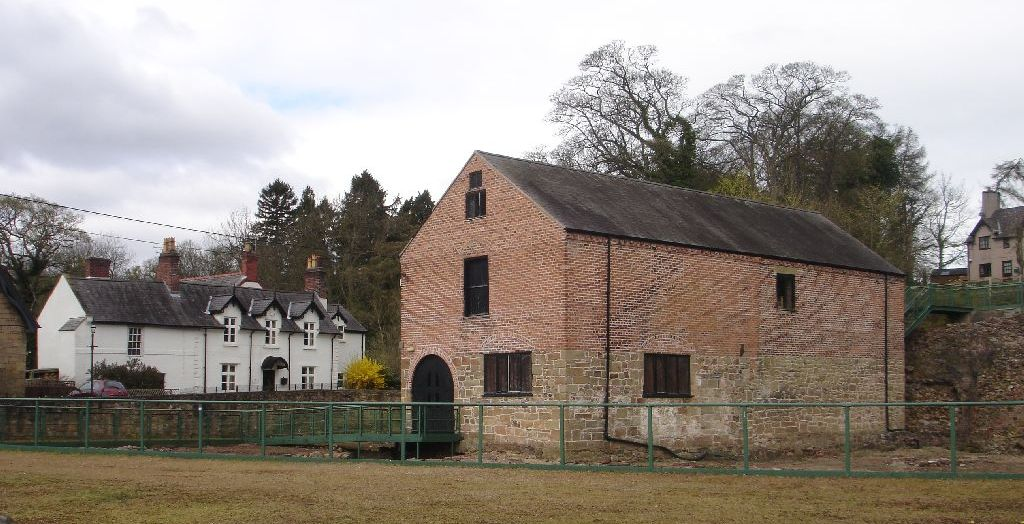
Bersham Ironworks

Although the Industrial Revolution did not much affect the rural parts of the area, there was considerable industrial activity in the North Wales Coalfield, particularly around Wrexham. The Bersham Ironworks at Bersham, in the same area, was at the forefront of technological advances and was most famous for being the original working site of the industrialist John Wilkinson who invented new processes for boring cannons. The Williams-Wynn family of Wynnstay had become rich after the dissolution of the monasteries and owned vast estates in Clwyd with resources including lead, tin and copper as well as corn and timber.

== Geography ==
Clwyd is in the northeastern corner of Wales. It is bounded by the Irish Sea to the north, the Welsh preserved counties of Gwynedd to the west and Powys to the south, and the English ceremonial counties of Shropshire and Cheshire to the southeast and east respectively; much of the eastern boundary follows the course of the River Dee and its estuary. Other large rivers in the area include the River Alyn, a tributary of the Dee, the River Clwyd and the River Conwy in the west. The northern coastal strip is heavily developed for tourism and has many resorts, including Llandudno, Colwyn Bay, Colwyn, Abergele, Rhyl and Prestatyn. In the northeast lies Deeside, the coastal plain beside the Dee estuary, and this part of Clwyd is heavily developed for industry. The area around Wrexham and the commuter settlements close to Chester are also heavily built up.

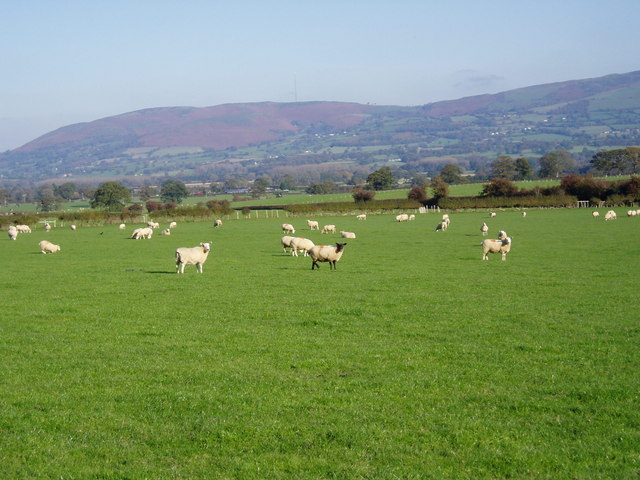
Sheep grazing with the Clwydian Range behind

To the west of this is a ridge of mountains with a steep scarp slope to the west, the Clwydian Range. The highest point of these hills is Moel Famau at 1,820 ft (555 m). The north-central part is the broad Vale of Clwyd, and the best agricultural land lies here. To the south of this, the land is much higher and more rugged, the Denbigh Moors and the Berwyn range are here. The central and western parts are much more rural than the coastal area and the east, with part of the Snowdonia National Park lying in the western part. The population as of 2007 is estimated at 491,100, based on figures for the four component unitary authority areas.

Since the 2003 boundary changes, its coastline has extended from the Dee Estuary in Flintshire through to Llanfairfechan. Clwyd consists of the whole of the historic county of Flintshire, and most of Denbighshire. Since 2003 it has also included the former district of Aberconwy, which lies in the historic county of Caernarfonshire, and also the former Edeyrnion Rural District in the historic county of Merionethshire.

== Economy ==
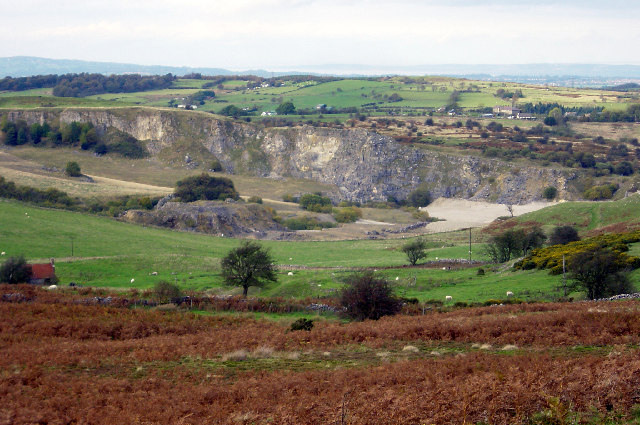
Limestone quarry at Minera Mountain

The land uses of any region depend on the underlying geology which influences the soil types. In the Clwydian Range, lead and spar minerals have been mined in the past, and limestone quarried from Llantysilio Mountain, Ruabon Mountain and Minera Mountain near Wrexham. The Minera Limeworks were once the largest lime workings in North Wales. Later, road building stone was extracted but the quarries closed in 1992. Coal mining in the North Wales Coalfield ceased in the second half of the twentieth century but used to be a large source of employment in the area. The main products being manufactured in industrial east Clwyd include aircraft components (Airbus), engines (Toyota), paper (Shotton Paper) and steel processing, and the port of Mostyn builds and supports offshore windfarms.

Agriculture, largely based on livestock, has traditionally been the main occupation in the central and western parts. There are a mix of large and small farm businesses, and a thriving dairy sector in the Vale of Clwyd. Many of the towns have livestock markets and the farming industry supports farm machinery merchants, vets, feed merchants, contractors and all the ancillary trades connected with agriculture. With their incomes on the decline, farmers have found opportunities in tourism, rural crafts, specialist food shops, farmers' markets and value-added food products.

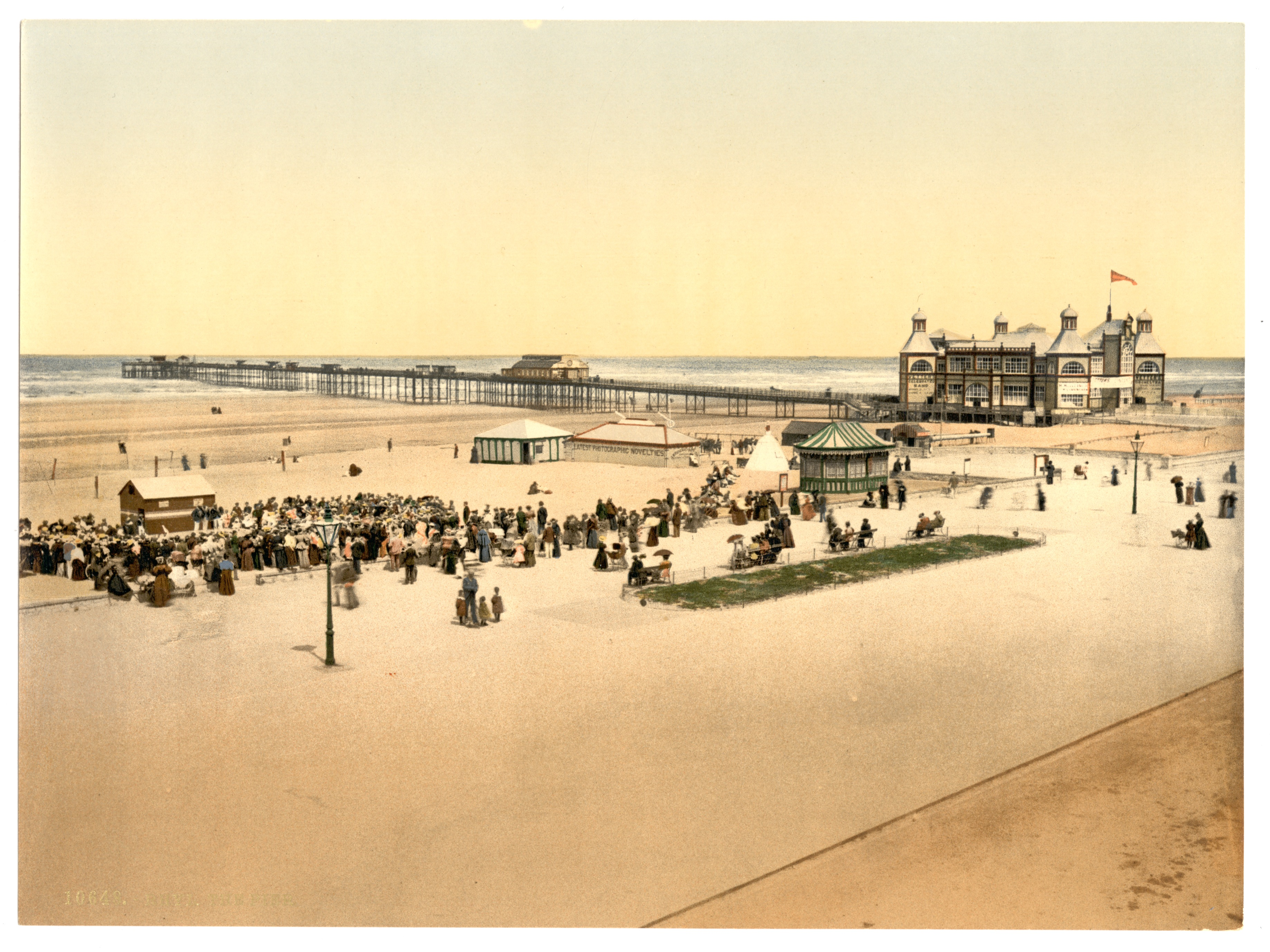
The Pier at Rhyl, about 1900

The upland areas with their sheep farms and small, stone-walled fields are attractive to visitors, and redundant farm buildings are often converted to self-catering accommodation while the farmhouses themselves supply bed-and-breakfast opportunities. The arrival of the railway on the coast in the mid-nineteenth century opened up travel from Merseyside and caused a boom in tourism, with guesthouses in seaside towns offering board and lodging for the urban visitors. More recently caravan sites and holiday villages have blossomed and there has been an increase in the ownership of "second homes".

Various initiatives designed to boost the economy of North Wales were being attempted in 2016. These include the Northern Gateway project on the former Sealand RAF site on Deeside, and a redevelopment project for the former Rhyl seafront and funfair.

== Administrative history ==
The Local Government Commission for Wales set up in 1958 was the first to recommend wholesale amalgamation of the administrative counties outside Glamorgan and Monmouthshire, with extensive boundary changes; however the then Minister of Housing and Local Government Sir Keith Joseph decided not to accept the report, noting that county amalgamations in England had been highly unpopular when proposed.

In 1967, after a change of government, the Secretary of State for Wales Cledwyn Hughes published a white paper which revived the idea of amalgamation, but instead of the boundary changes proposed in the previous report, treated each county as a whole. The report recommended a single new Gwynedd incorporating Denbighshire, Flintshire, Caernarfonshire, Merionethshire and Anglesey. The white paper stated that "the need for early action is particularly urgent in Wales", and so the issue was not referred to a Royal Commission as in England. Opponents criticised the proposed new council for being too large, and in November 1968 a new Secretary of State, George Thomas, announced that Gwynedd would be divided into two.

This revised proposal was continued in a further white paper in March 1970, although this proposed that the councils be unitary authorities which would have no district councils below them. The incoming Conservative government resurrected two-tier local government in a consultative document published in February 1971, again with the same upper-tier boundaries. Some minor changes having been made to the existing boundaries due to special local factors, the Local Government Act 1972 duly created Clwyd as a merger of Flintshire with most of Denbighshire, along with the Edeyrnion Rural District from Merionethshire. The 1970 white paper had introduced the name of Clwyd by reference to the River Clwyd and the Clwydian range of hills; Clwyd was the only new Welsh county which did not take its name from an ancient kingdom.

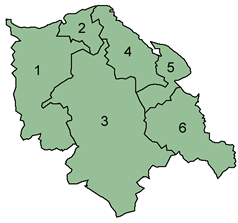
Districts of Clwyd: 1, Colwyn 2, Rhuddlan 3, Glyndwr 4, Delyn 5, Alyn & Deeside 6, Wrexham Maelor

For second-tier local government purposes, Clwyd was divided into six districts: Alyn and Deeside, Colwyn, Delyn, Glyndŵr, Rhuddlan and Wrexham Maelor, each being operated by a district or borough council. These were abolished, along with the county itself, on 1 April 1996. Clwyd County Council's coat of arms was granted in December 1974. The design of the shield, crest and motto includes elements taken from the arms of the former councils of Flintshire and Denbighshire. The green and white wave represents the Vale of Clwyd and the Clwydian Range lying between the two parts. The cross and choughs come from Flintshire's shield, which itself incorporated the traditional arms of Edwin of Tegeingl, while the black lion of the Princes of Powys Fadog is taken from Denbighshire's shield. The motto, Tarian Cyfiawnder Duw can be translated as "The shield of Justice is God".

Clwyd County Council and its districts were abolished by the Local Government (Wales) Act 1994, and local government would be replaced by the four unitary authorities of Flintshire, Wrexham County Borough, Denbighshire, and parts of Conwy (along with some smaller communities moving to Powys). The Act also abolished the County, and states the term "county" would be synonymous with the "principal areas" created by the 1994 Act. However the Act then created a further set of "preserved counties", which were based on the eight created by the 1972 Act. These Preserved Counties, similar in respect to English Ceremonial counties, would be retained for a variety of purposes, including lieutenancy and shrievalty.

Clwyd County Council and its six districts ceased operations at midnight on 1 April 1996, and local government was immediately transferred to the new principal areas of Conwy, Denbighshire, Flintshire and Wrexham. However, although bearing the same names, the boundaries of Flintshire and Denbighshire were substantially different from those of the historic counties. As it happened, the county records for historic Flintshire had been retained at the Hawarden branch of the Clwyd Records Office while those for historic Denbighshire had continued to be held at the Ruthin branch, so there was no problem in segregating the records.

The Preserved County of Clwyd came into effect on the same day that Clwyd County Council was abolished. The preserved county was almost identical to the 1974–96 county, but had a few minor changes in line with changes to local government boundaries, the communities of Llanrhaeadr-ym-Mochnant, Llansilin and Llangedwyn being transferred from Clwyd to Powys.

== 2003 boundary review ==
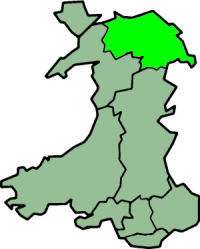
Clwyd as a preserved county since 2003.

In 2003, the borders of Clwyd were changed to cover the remainder of Conwy (which had previously been part of Gwynedd), which was part of a Wales-wide re-organisation of the preserved counties, so that boundaries of the preserved counties would contain whole current principal areas only.

This led to some areas, such as the Aberconwy district, moving to a preserved county it had never been administered by in the past, and therefore these moves went generally unreported due to the preserved county's limited status. The Boundary Commission proceeded to retain the eight preserved counties, and modified their borders in 2003 to match with the incumbent principal area boundaries. The 2003 arrangement brings towns such as Llandudno and Conwy into the preserved county of Clwyd.

== Legacy ==
Some local organisations still make use of the word "Clwyd" in their name, often because their membership covers a wider area than their present unitary authority. These organisations include the Theatr Clwyd, which is based in Mold and is the largest producing arts centre in Wales. It provides young people the opportunity to get involved in drama. The Clwyd Family History Society can help its members to access many historical documents concerning northeastern Wales, and the Clwyd-Powys Archaeological Trust is one of four archaeological trusts covering the whole of Wales. The Clwyd County Darts Association organises tournaments and takes part in inter-county matches. The Clwyd East Football League was created in 2011 to represent the North East Wales area at the fifth tier of Welsh Football. It has subsequently changed its name to the North East Wales Football League. The Clwyd Pension Fund is the Local Government pension scheme inherited from Clwyd County Council, now providing pension schemes for Wrexham, Flintshire and Denbighshire unitary authorities and former districts.

The position of Lord Lieutenant of Clwyd also continues as the Monarch's personal representative, as with the other seven preserved counties of Wales. The current Lord Lieutenant is Henry George Fetherstonhaugh, who was appointed in 2013.

== Landmarks ==
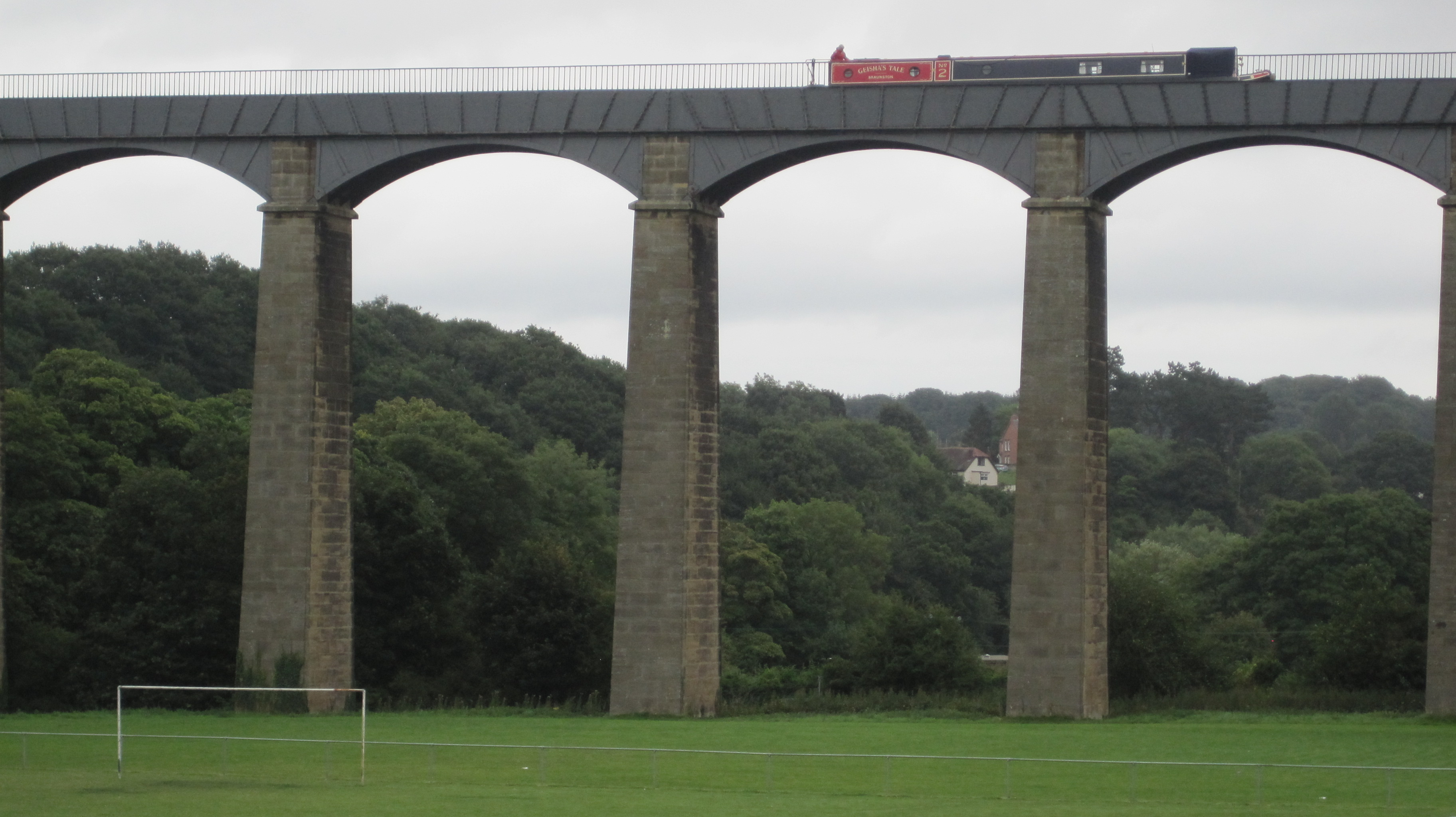
Narrowboat crossing the Pontcysyllte Aqueduct

The Pontcysyllte Aqueduct was built by Thomas Telford in 1805 and is the largest aqueduct in the United Kingdom; it carries the Llangollen Canal over the River Dee and is a World Heritage Site, being considered a masterpiece of civil engineering. The Clwydian Range and Dee Valley constitute an Area of Outstanding Natural Beauty, one of just five in the whole of Wales. Denbigh, Colwyn and Ruthin are historic towns and Llangollen hosts the Llangollen International Musical Eisteddfod in July each year.

The Gop is a Neolithic mound, the second largest such structure in Britain being only superseded by Silbury Hill. Caer Drewyn is one of many Iron Age hill forts in Clwyd that attest to human occupation of this area for millennia. Maen Achwyfan Cross is a carved 10th century wheel cross depicting Celtic and Viking symbols. The castles of Rhuddlan and Flint were built by the Normans during their invasion of North Wales and Castell Dinas Brân was a Welsh fortress of the same period. St Asaph Cathedral also dates from the thirteenth century as does the medieval Cistercian abbey of Valle Crucis.

Bodnant Garden is a formal garden in a landscaped setting, and Erddig Hall is a stately home, both owned by the National Trust. Other fine country houses in Clwyd include Trevor Hall and Faenol Fawr, Bodelwyddan, while Plas Mawr and Aberconwy House are historic town houses in Conwy. Also in Conwy is the Conwy Suspension Bridge, one of the first such bridges in the world.

== Transport ==
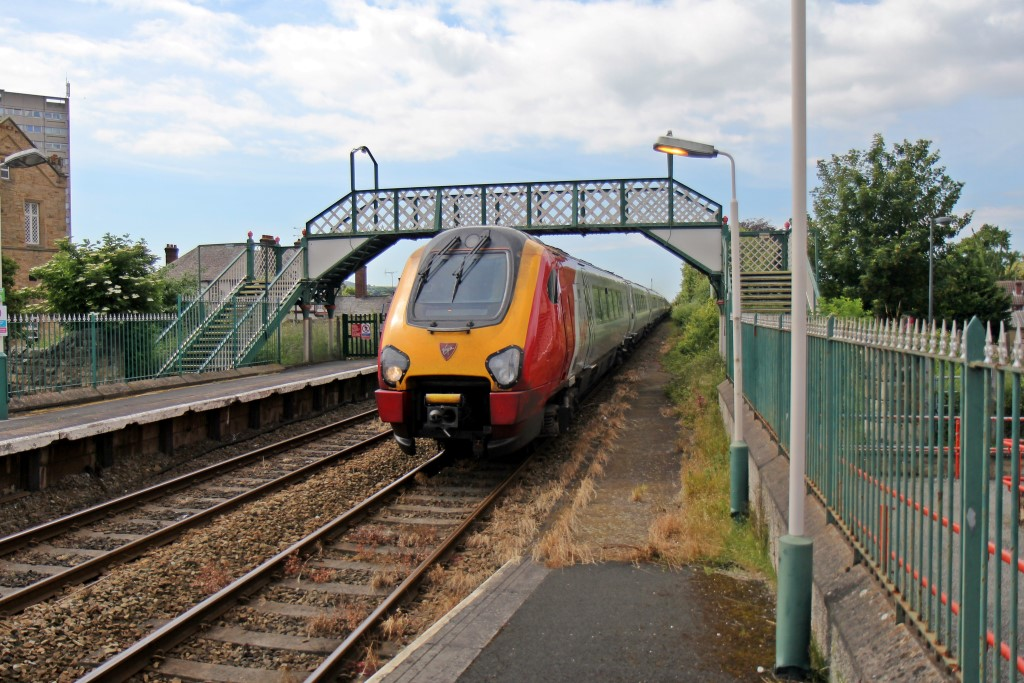
Virgin Voyager approaching Flint railway station

The North Wales Coast Line is the railway line from Crewe to Holyhead, served by Transport for Wales and Avanti West Coast services. Trains leaving Crewe pass through Chester, cross the River Dee into Wales, and continue through stations such as: Shotton, Flint, Prestatyn, Rhyl, Colwyn Bay, Llandudno Junction, Conwy and Bangor, to Holyhead, from where there is a ferry service to Ireland. Passengers can change at Shotton for the Borderlands Line, which links Wrexham with Bidston on the Wirral Peninsula in England. The Conwy Valley Line links Llandudno Junction to Blaenau Ffestiniog via Betws-y-Coed and was constructed mainly for use as a freight line for the transport of slate to the quay at Deganwy for export by sea. It is a scenic route with a number of request stops. The Shrewsbury–Chester line connects Wrexham General, northwards to Chester and southwards to other stations in the present-day county borough and to Shrewsbury.

There are no motorways in Clwyd. The A55 dual carriageway road passes from Chester through St Asaph to the North Wales coast at Abergele, after which it runs parallel to the railway line through Conwy and Bangor to terminate at Holyhead. The A483 connects Wrexham northwards to Chester, and southwards to Ruabon and Chirk. The A548 passes from Chester to Abergele through Deeside and along the coast, before leaving the coast and terminating at Llanrwst. The main road from London is the A5 which enters Clwyd at Chirk and passes northwestwards through Llangollen, Corwen and Betws-y-Coed to join the A55 and terminate at Bangor. The A543 crosses the Denbigh Moors from southeast to northwest, and the A525 links Ruthin with St Asaph. There are local bus services between the main centres of population. Several services by Arriva Buses Wales run along the main coast road between Chester and Holyhead, linking the coastal resorts. Other routes include: Llandudno to Llanrwst and Betws-y-Coed via Conwy and Dolgarrog; Rhyl to Denbigh; Wrexham to Chester; and Wrexham to Mold.

== See also ==
- List of Lord Lieutenants of Clwyd
- List of High Sheriffs of Clwyd
- List of places in Denbighshire
- List of places in Flintshire
- List of places in Conwy County Borough
- List of places in Wrexham County Borough
