= Aberconwy House =

Historic house in Conwy, Wales

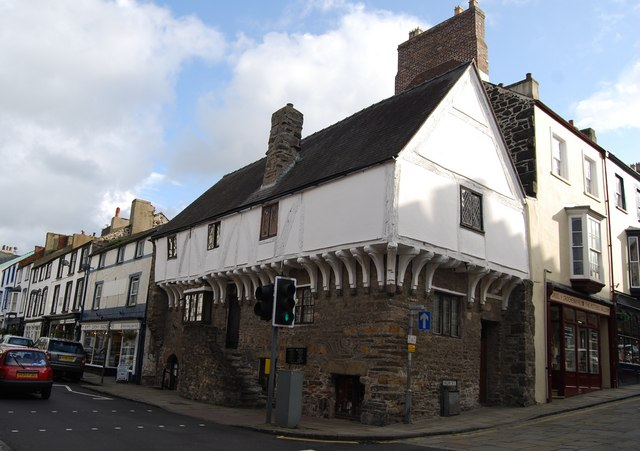
- The house at the corner of Castle Street and High Street

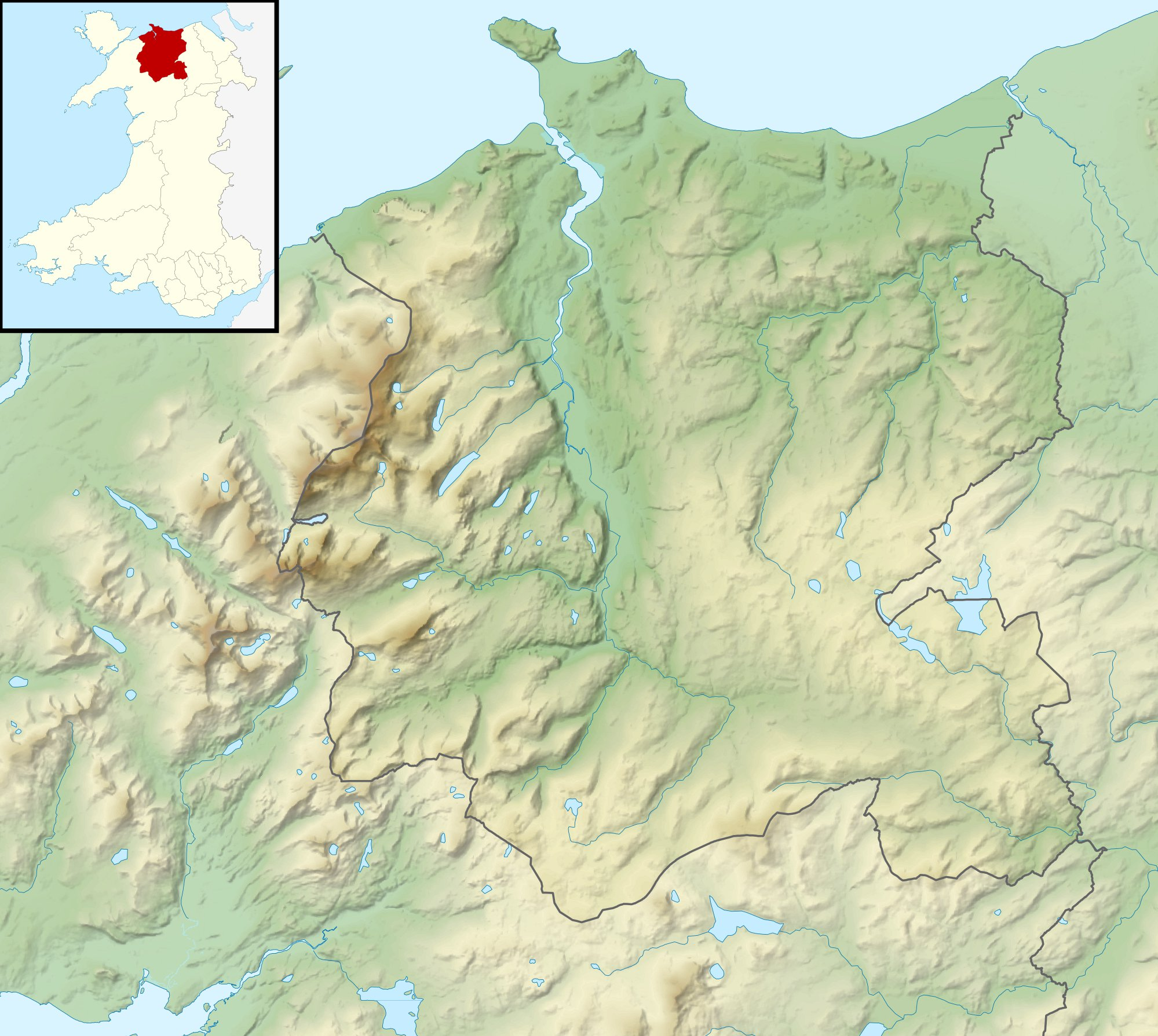
- Location within Conwy
- 53.2816°N 3.8285°W
- Type: House
- Location: Conwy, Conwy County Borough, Wales

History
- Built: C.1420

Site notes
- Architectural style: Vernacular
- Restored: 1976
- Governing body: National Trust

Listed Building – Grade I
- Official name: Aberconwy House
- Designated: 23 September 1950
- Reference no.: 3262

Aberconwy House, 2 Castle Street, Conwy, Wales is a medieval merchant's house and one of the oldest dateable houses in Wales. Constructed in the 15th century it is, along with Plas Mawr, one of the two surviving merchant's houses within the town. Its historical and architectural importance is reflected in its status as a Grade I listed building. The house is administered by the National Trust.

== History ==
Following the Conquest of Wales by Edward I in the late 13th century, Conwy, with its castle and walls, became an important strategic and commercial centre. The town was granted a Royal charter in 1284 and English settlers, particularly from the counties of Cheshire and Lancashire, were encouraged to populate the new borough. Aberconwy House is a rare survivor of a number of such houses-cum-warehouses built by English merchants trading on the Welsh Marches in the medieval period. The town planner and architect, John B. Hilling, in his 2018 study, The Architecture of Wales: from the first to the twenty-first century, describes it as the "sole survivor of [such] houses built in Edward I's Welsh 'new-towns'". Tree-ring analysis of the roof timbers shows that the trees were felled c. 1417–1420. This dating makes it one of the oldest dateable houses in Wales and its importance was recognised in 1950 when it was designated a Grade I listed building. In the 19th and 20th centuries, the house served as a temperance hotel and, following closure and other subsequent uses, it was left to the National Trust in 1934. The Trust undertook an extensive restoration in 1976 and the house is now run as a museum.

== Architecture and description ==
The house is of two upper storeys, over a cellar. The top floor is jettied, with the overhanging structure supported on corbel stones, "a mark of prosperity". The building is constructed around a timber frame which shows a Kentish or Wealden influence.
