= Faenol Fawr, Bodelwyddan =

Elizabethan mansion in Denbighshire, Wales

Faenol Fawr
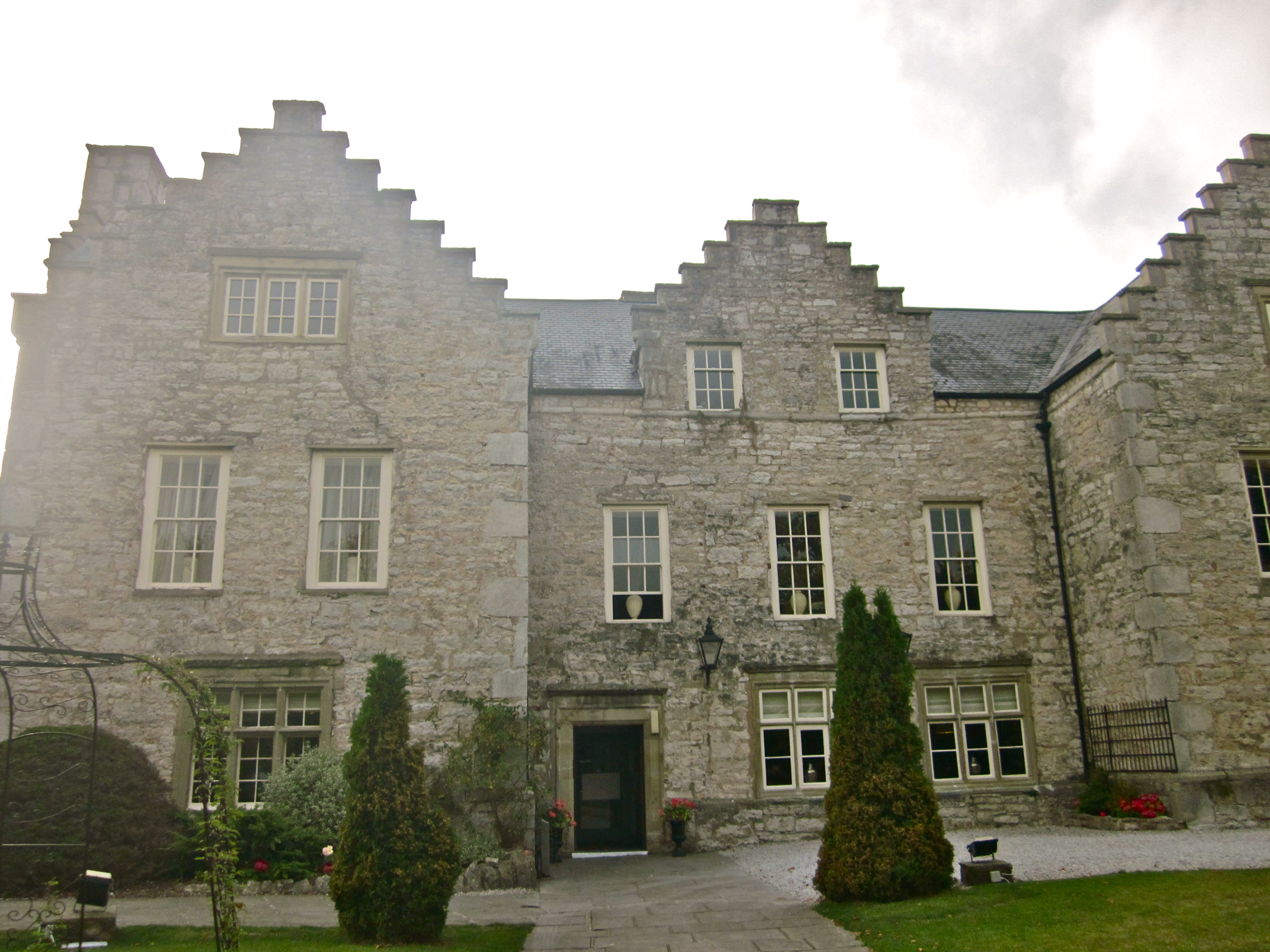
- East Front

- Location in Denbighshire
- 53.275171°N 3.499719°W
- Location: Bodelwyddan, Denbighshire, Wales
- OS grid reference: SJ0008976396

History
- Built: 16th/early 18th century

Site notes
- Architectural style: Elizabethan H-shaped stone house with crow-stepped gables.
- Restored: 1984
- Restored by: after fire

Listed Building – Grade II*
- Designated: 24 September 1951
- Reference no.: Cadw Building ID: 1357

Faenol Fawr is an Elizabethan H-plan mansion with crow-stepped gables. The house is situated immediately to the north of Glan Clwyd Hospital in the parish of Bodelwyddan in the historic county of Flintshire, but now in Denbighshire. It was formerly in the township of Faenol, which until 1860 was in the parish of St. Asaph.

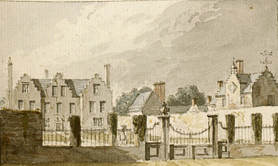
Faenol Fawr, Bodelwyddan, c 1776

Thomas Pennant passed by Faenol Fawr in his Tour to Snowdonia in 1776, when he records: "In a very wet situation, beneath Kinmael, is Vaenol; one of the best old houses in the county of Flint. It was built in 1595, by John Lloyd…. register (Registrar) of St Asaph in the reign of Queen Elizabeth; a place extremely profitable, before the powers of the church were abridged". An extra illustrated copy of the Tour in Wales in the National Library of Wales, has a water-colour of Faenol Fawr in about 1776, which shows that present building is little changed in appearance. The house is listed Grade II*, as is the dovecote to the west of the house. There is another smaller and earlier house with a cyclopean doorway that is now joined to the main house. Immediately to the N W is the Old Farm House with crow stepped gables, which is listed grade II, as is also the large barn to the east. Facing the Old Farm House is a row of converted cartsheds. The house was badly damaged by fire in 1980 and has now been converted into a country house hotel.

== History of the house ==
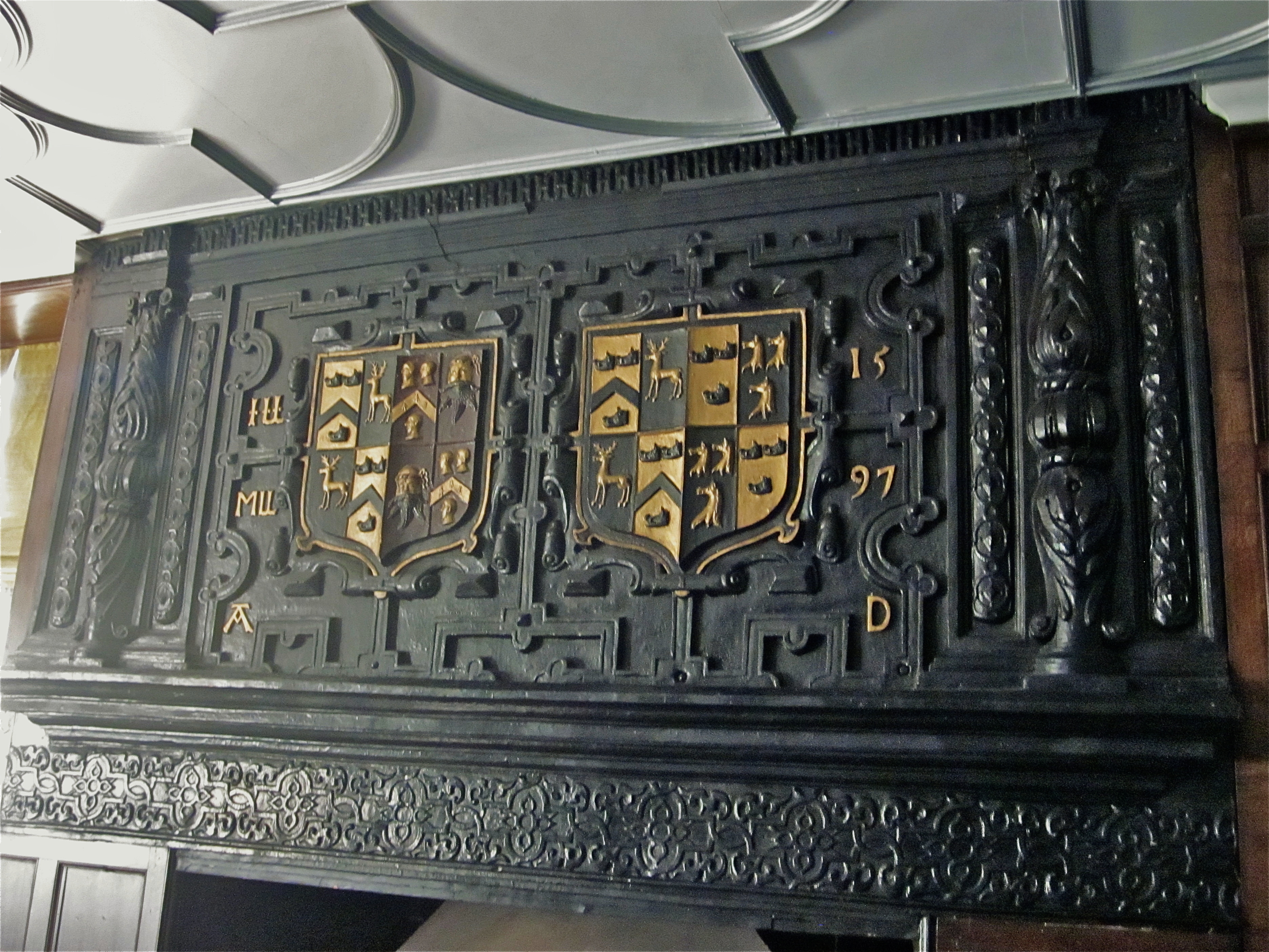
Faenol Fawr, Bodelwyddan. South wing interior. Lloyd Armorials of 1597 over fireplace.

In August 1887 the house was visited by the Cambrian Archaeological Association.

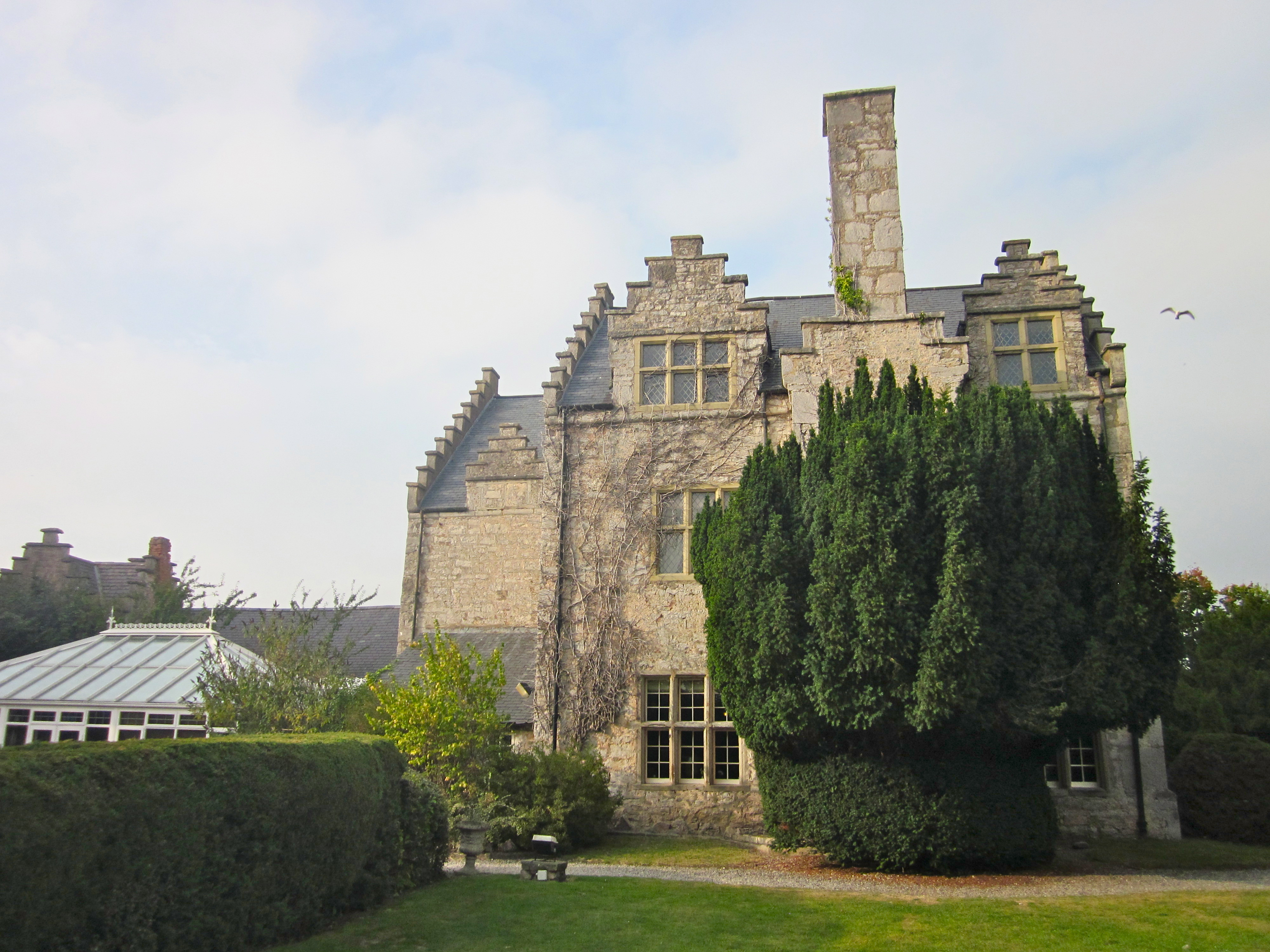
Faenol Fawr, Bodelwyddan. South wing with lateral chimney stack.

They reported that:

The picturesque manor-house of Vaenol, with its stepped gables, is an interesting specimen of an Elizabethan mansion, having been built by John Lloyd, Registrar of the diocese of St Asaph, in 1597, as shown by a shield of arms with the initialsI.LL. M.LL. 1597. His daughter and heiress, married William Price of Rhiwlas (near Bala), in whose family it continued until a few years ago, when it was sold to the Baronet of Bodelwyddan. Over the entrance door was carved the legend VIVE UT Vivas 1725, and other internal arrangements were indicated by the dates 1690 and 1770. The paneling and ceiling of the drawing room, with its shields and arms is handsome. The great hall has been subdivided and the stairs cut off in one direction, and the great fireplace in another.

A detailed photographic record of the house was made in 1954 by George Bernard Mason, as part of the National Buildings Record survey. This shows the house and farm buildings in a dilapidated state and provides a record of the house before the fire of 1980.

== Architectural description ==
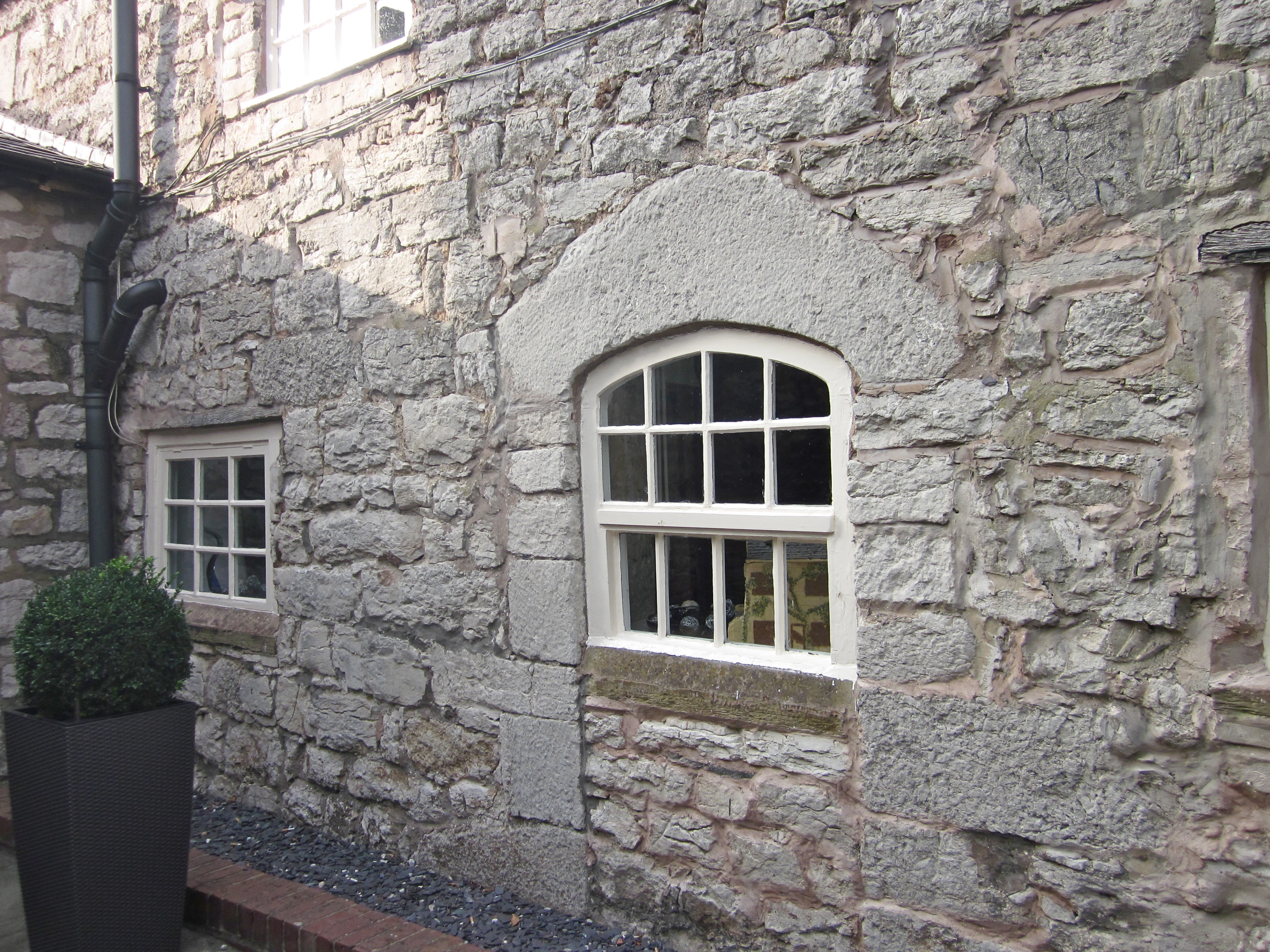
Faenol Fawr, Bodelwyddan. Older house with Cyclopean blocked doorway

Faenol Fawr is an Elizabethan ‘H’ plan mansion with crow stepped gables. The house is situated immediately to the north of Glan Clwyd Hospital in the parish of Bodelwyddan in Denbighshire. It was formerly in the township of Faenol, which until 1860 was in the parish of St.Asaph. The house is listed Grade II* as is the dovecote to the west of the hose. There is another smaller and earlier house with a ‘‘cyclopean’’ doorway that is now joined to the main house. Immediately to the north west is the Old Farm House with crow stepped gables, which is listed grade II, as is the large barn to the east. Facing the Old Farm House is a row of cartsheds. The house was badly damaged by fire in 1980 and has now been converted into a country house hotel.

=== The older house ===
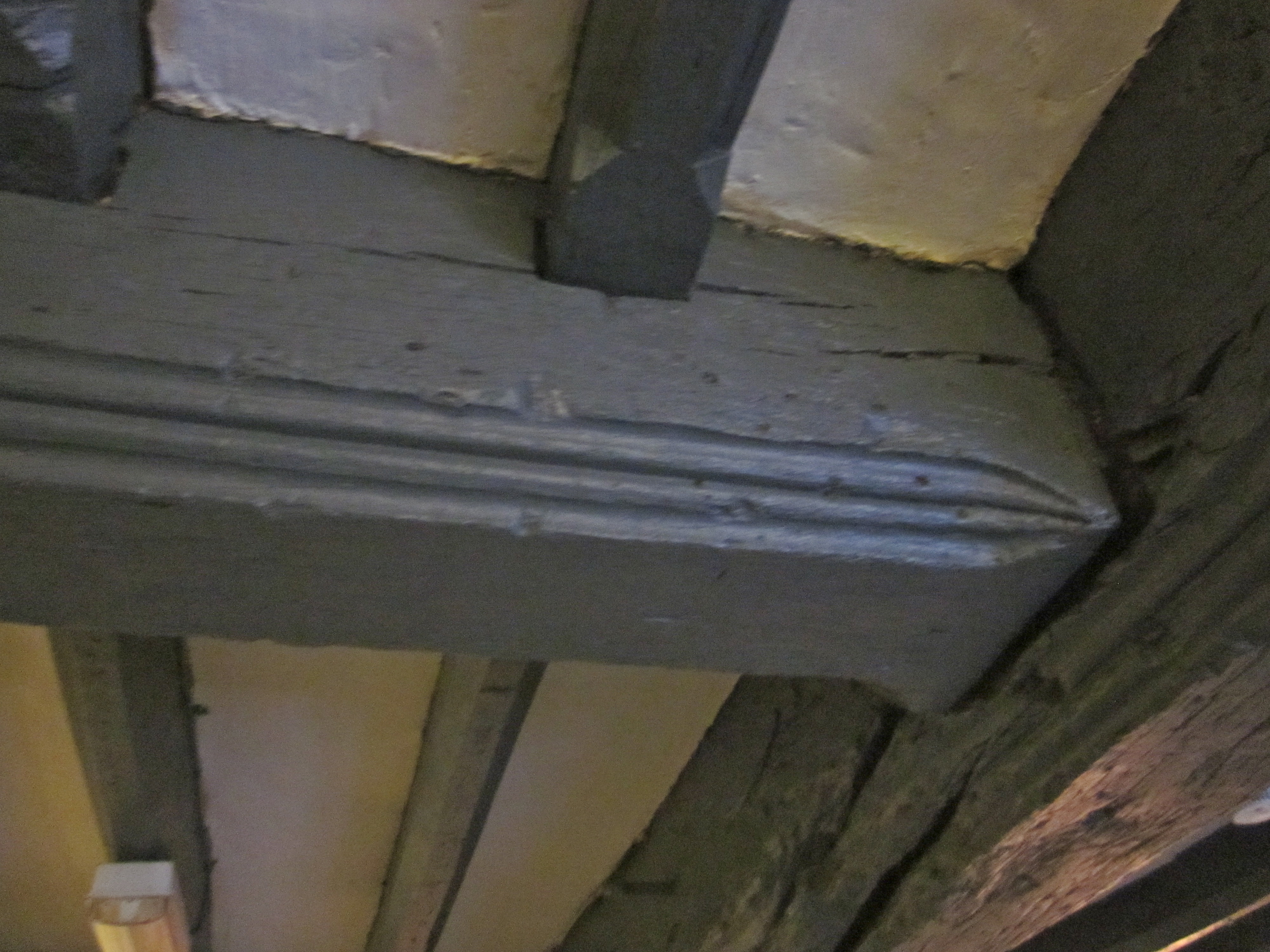
Faenol Fawr, Bodelwyddan. Decorative beam mouldings in older house to north and now linked to main building

This is likely to be earlier 16th century in date. It appears to have been a two storied, hall house, with cruck framing and stone walls. The evidence for the cruck roof is from a photography the Rev N W Watson, and this roof may still be in place. Cyclopean doorways have been studied by Peter Smith, who shows that they are distributed mainly in Denbighshire and Merionethshire. These massive arched stone door lintels were introduced at a time, probably around 1600, when stone walling was replacing timber framing and may encase an earlier timber structure. A much altered post and panel screens passage with three entrances, now in the hall area of the main house, is likely to have been removed from the hall in the older house. This screens passage would have been associated with the finely moulded beams in the older house. These moulded beams can be compared with similar beams at Maesycastell in Caernarvonshire and Perthywig in Denbighshire which are illustrated by Smith

=== Faenol Fawr: the main house ===
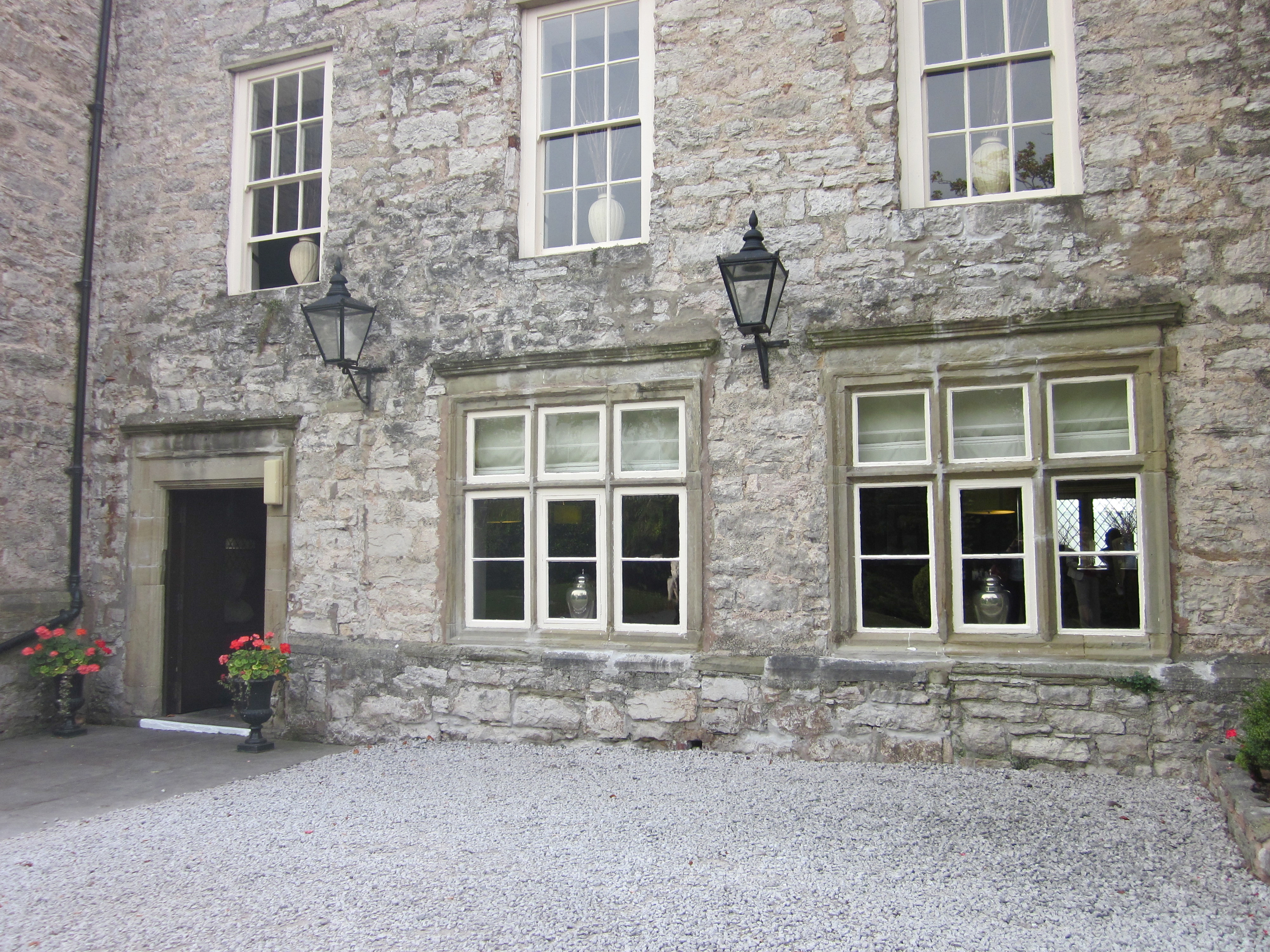
Faenol Fawr, Bodelwyddan. Doorway dated 1725 and mullioned windows with 18th-century sash windows above.

This house with crow stepped gables is almost certainly the house built in 1597 for John, Lloyd, the registrar of the diocese of St. Asaph, and then, on the basis of the date over the front door extensively altered in 1725 or slightly earlier. The house is H-shaped with a further extension to the rear or west side. The wings on either side of the centrally placed are three storied with stepped dormer windows. Most of the stone mullioned windows have been replaced, but some of the original windows survive mainly at ground floor level and there are also some 18th-century sash windows.

=== The dovecote ===
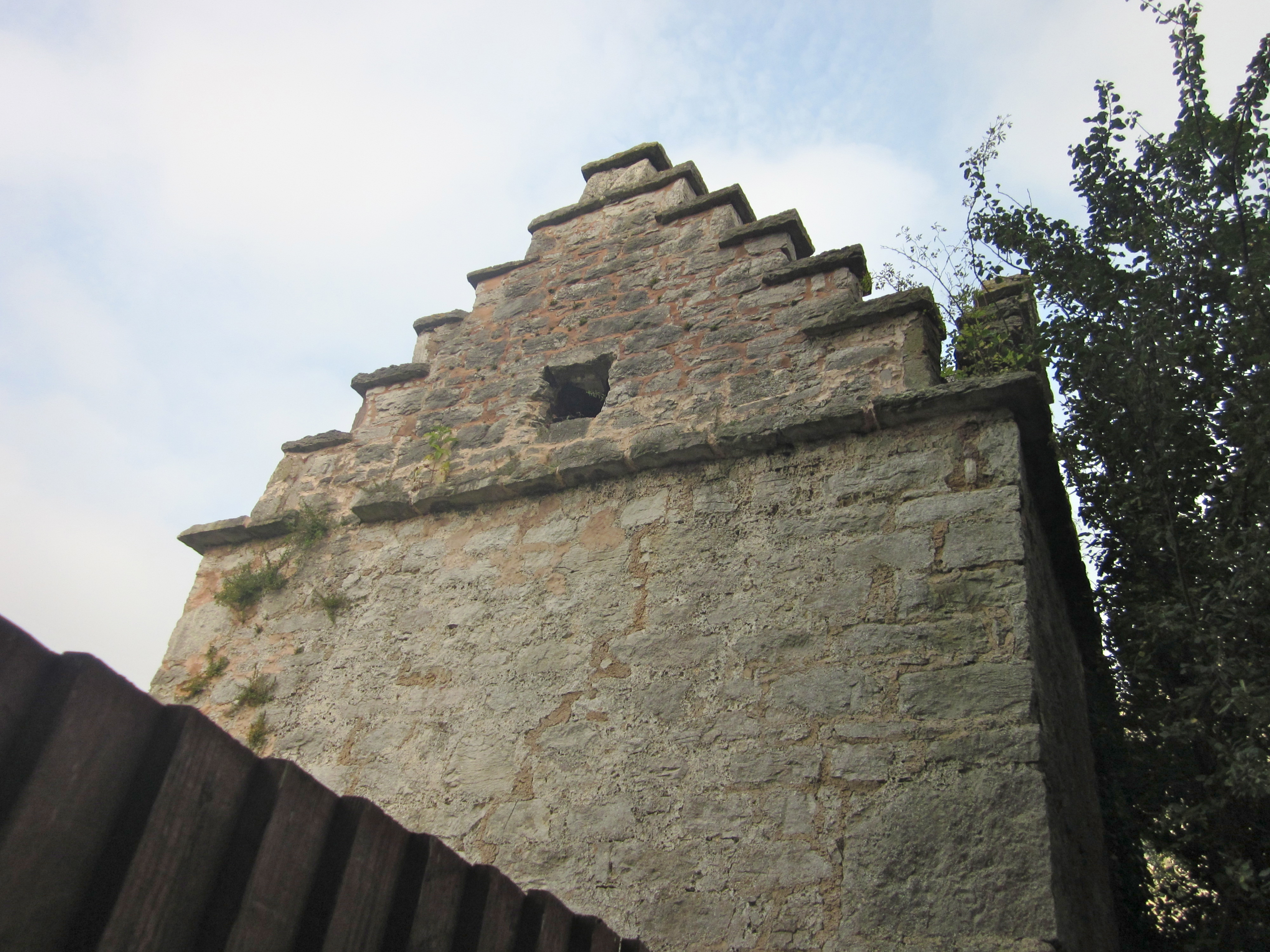
Faenol Fawr, Bodelwyddan. Dovecote on W side.

This a particularly fine example of a square built stone dovecote with crow stepped gables. It stands immediately to the west of the main house and is likely to be contemporary with it.

=== The farmhouse, barn and cartsheds ===
The farm complex lies immediately to the NW of the main house. The farmhouse is similar in date to the main house and has crow stepped gables.

== Faenol Fawr Gallery ==
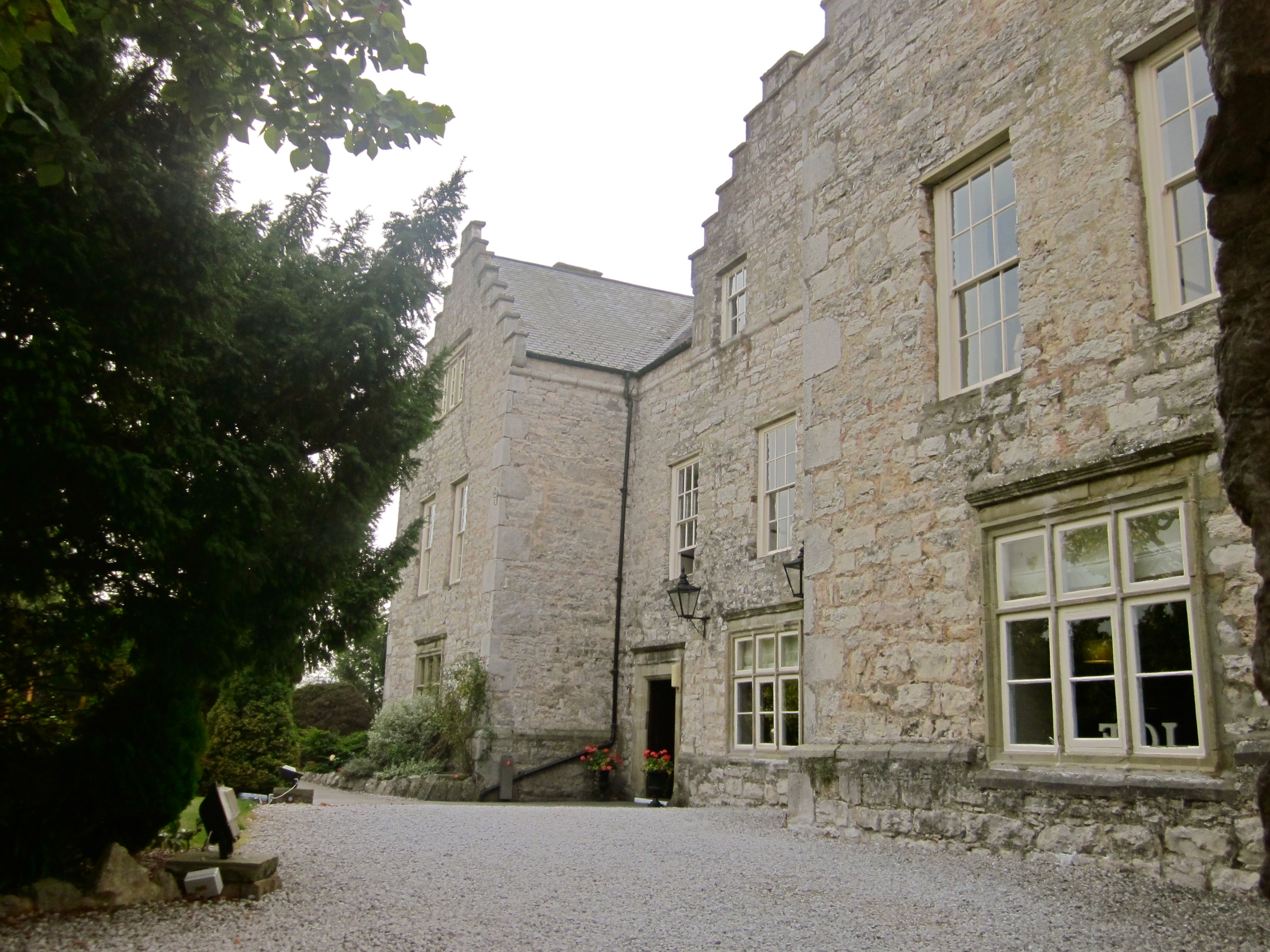
East front of house

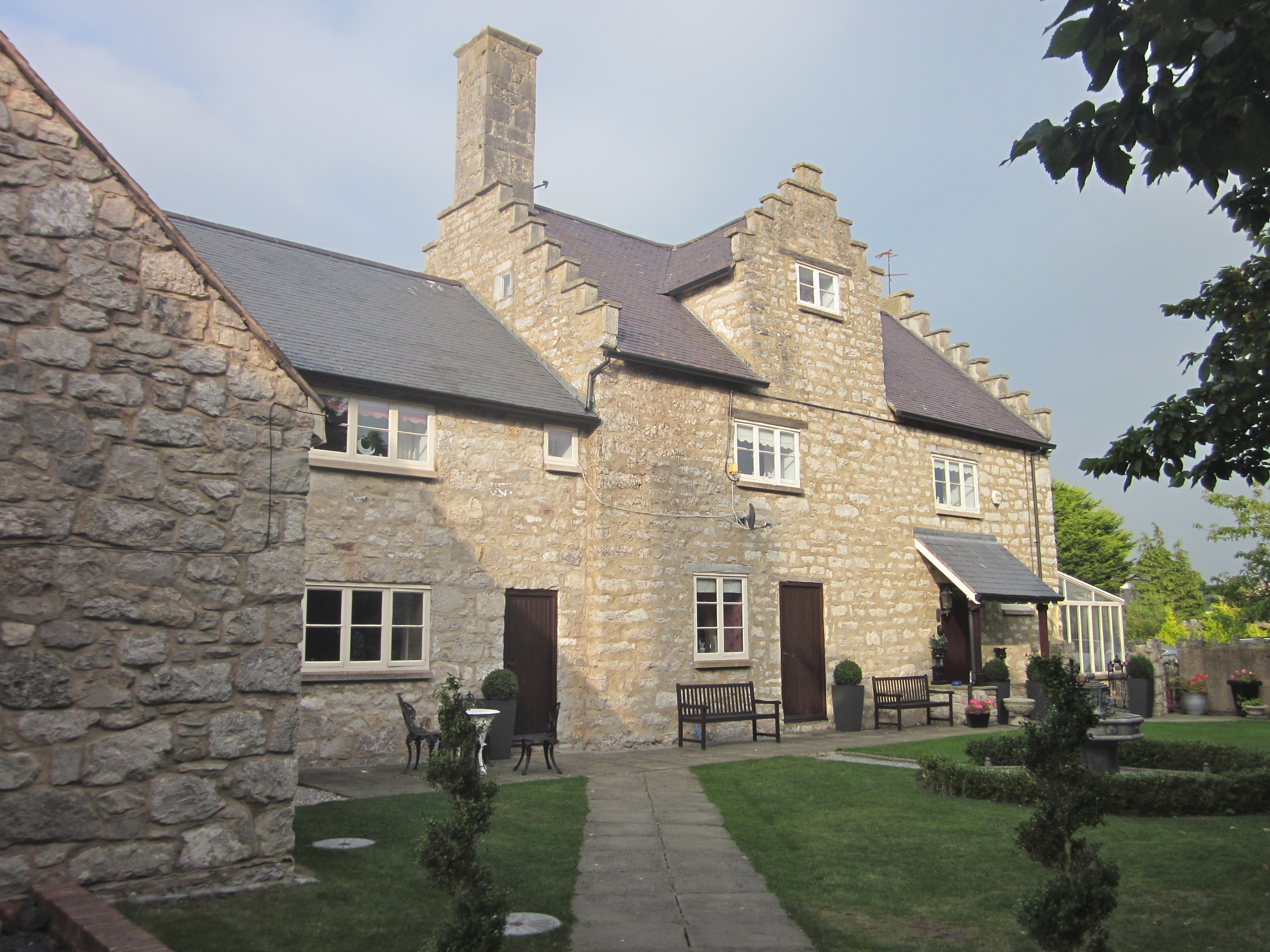
Old farmhouse

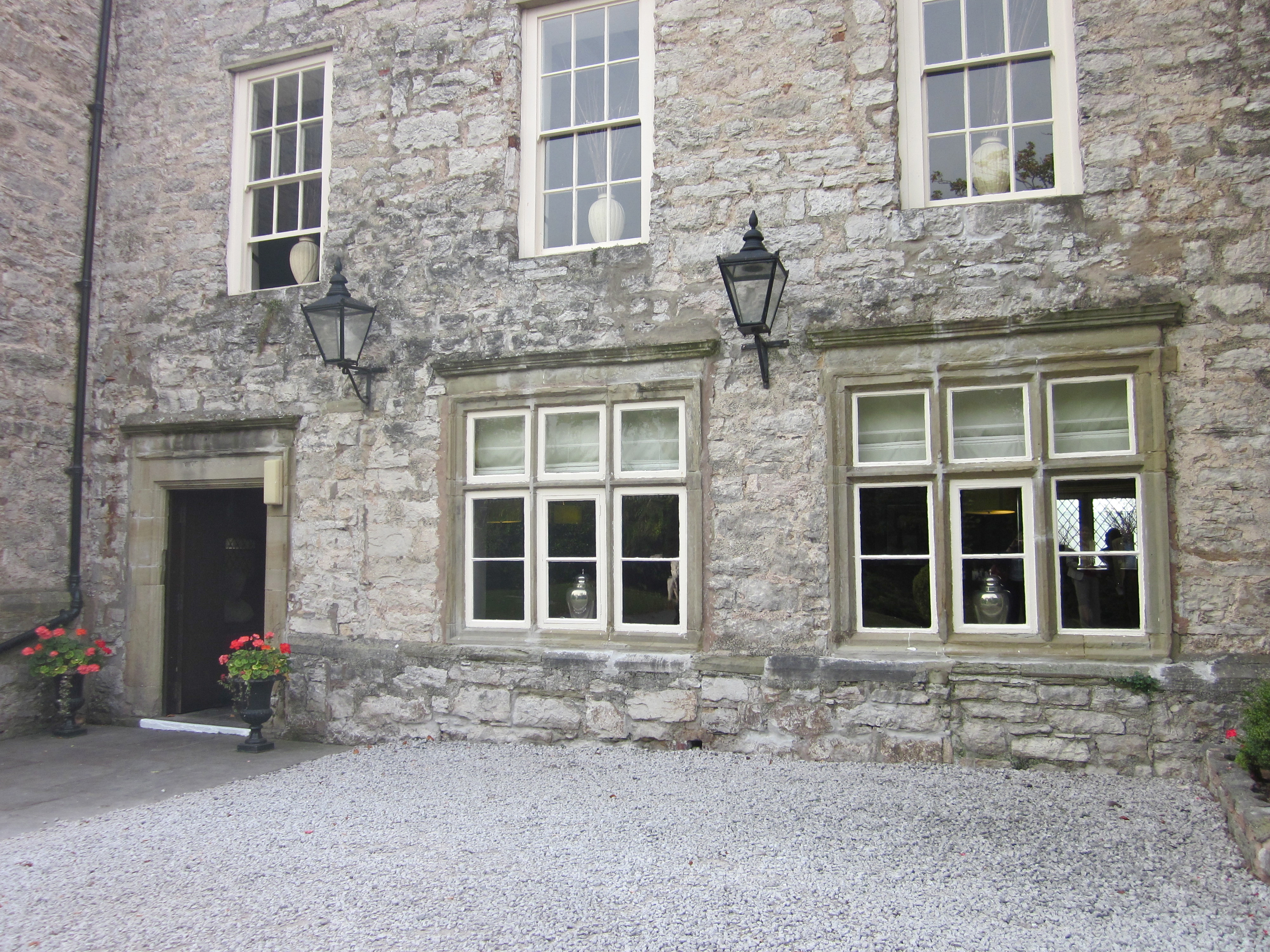
Doorway dated 1725 and mullioned windows.

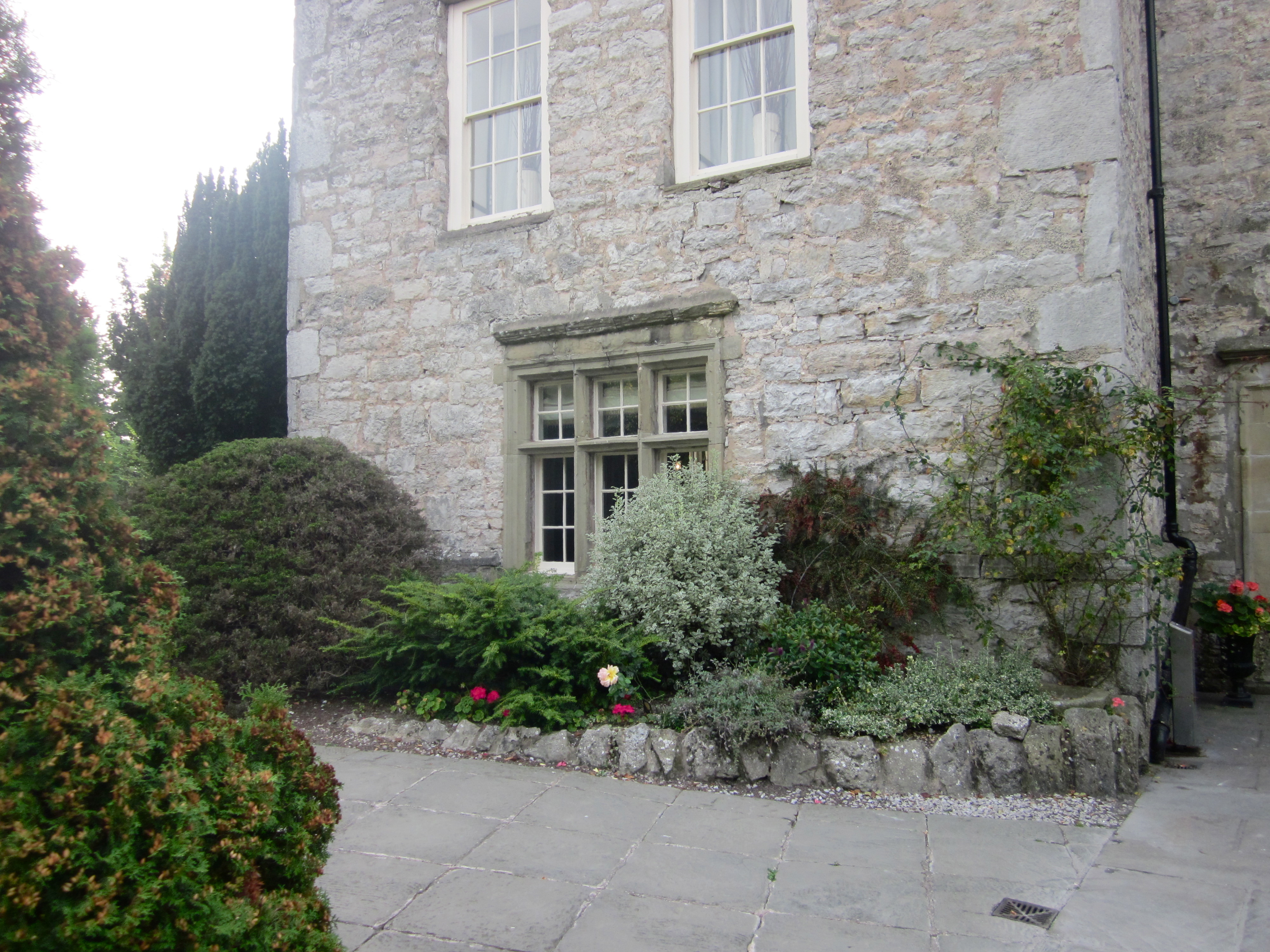
Original mullioned window on gable to south wing

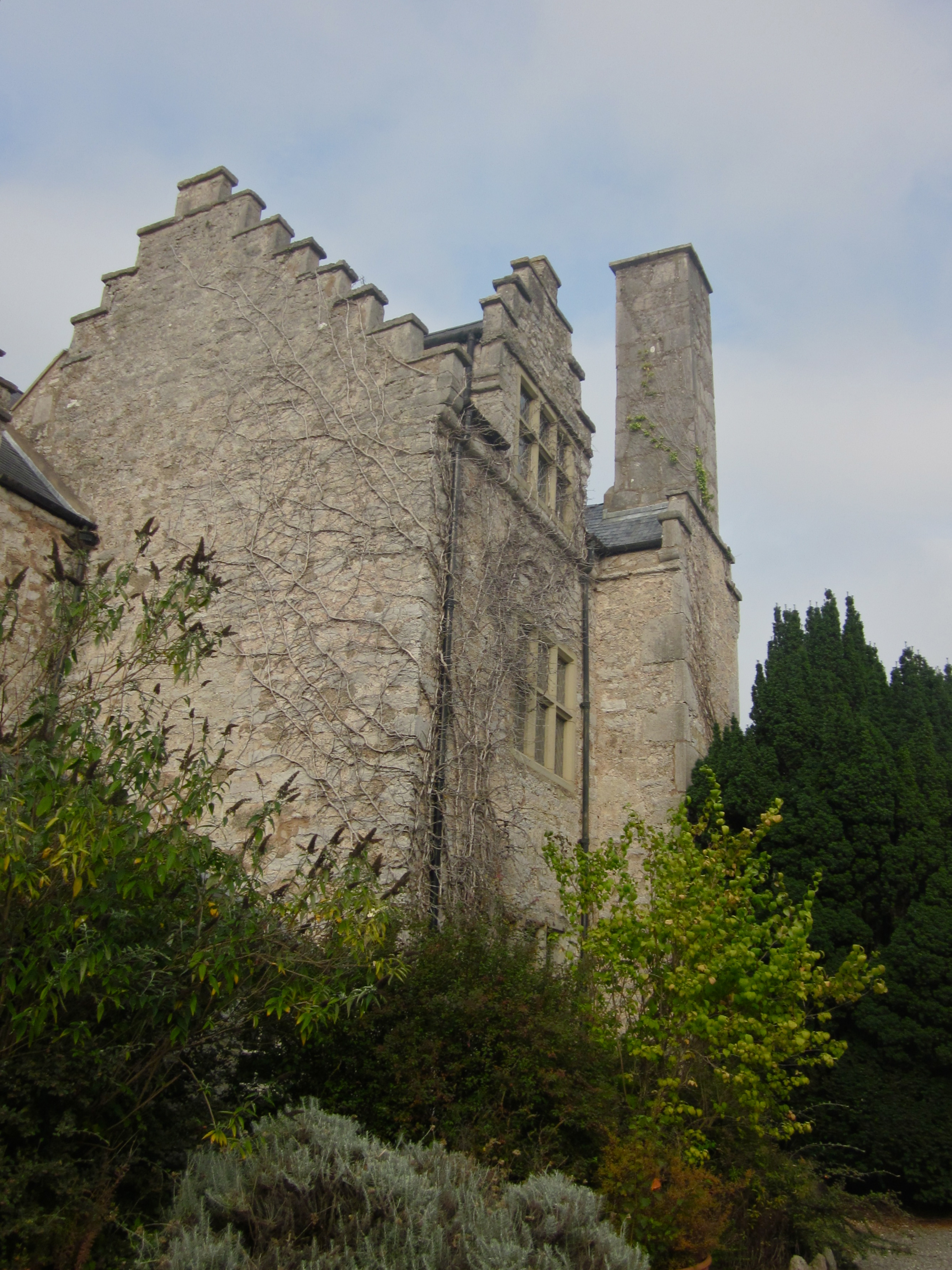
South west crow stepped gable. South wing with lateral chimney stack.

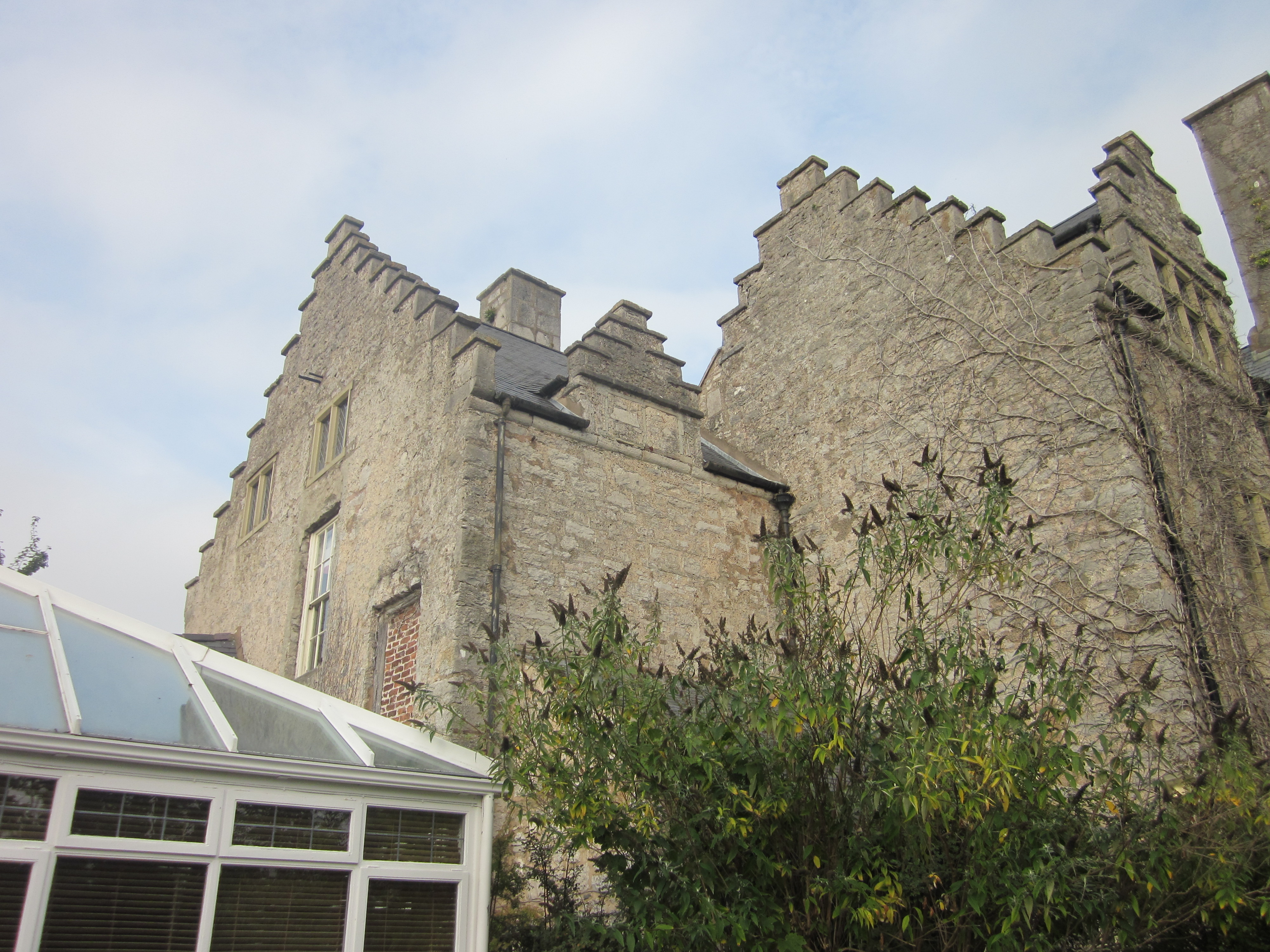
West crowstepped gables

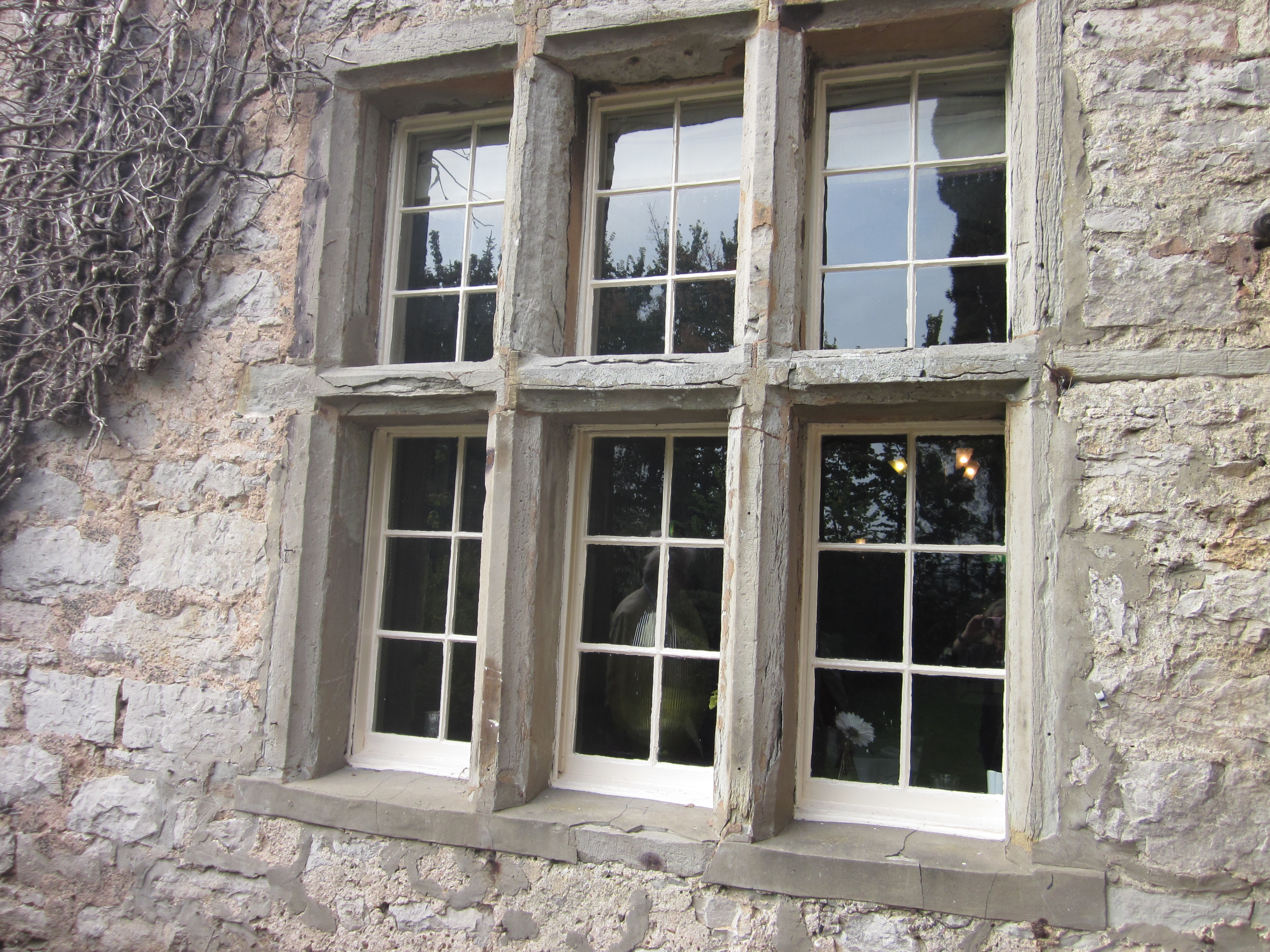
South wing with mullioned window - one pair of windows on right are blocked.

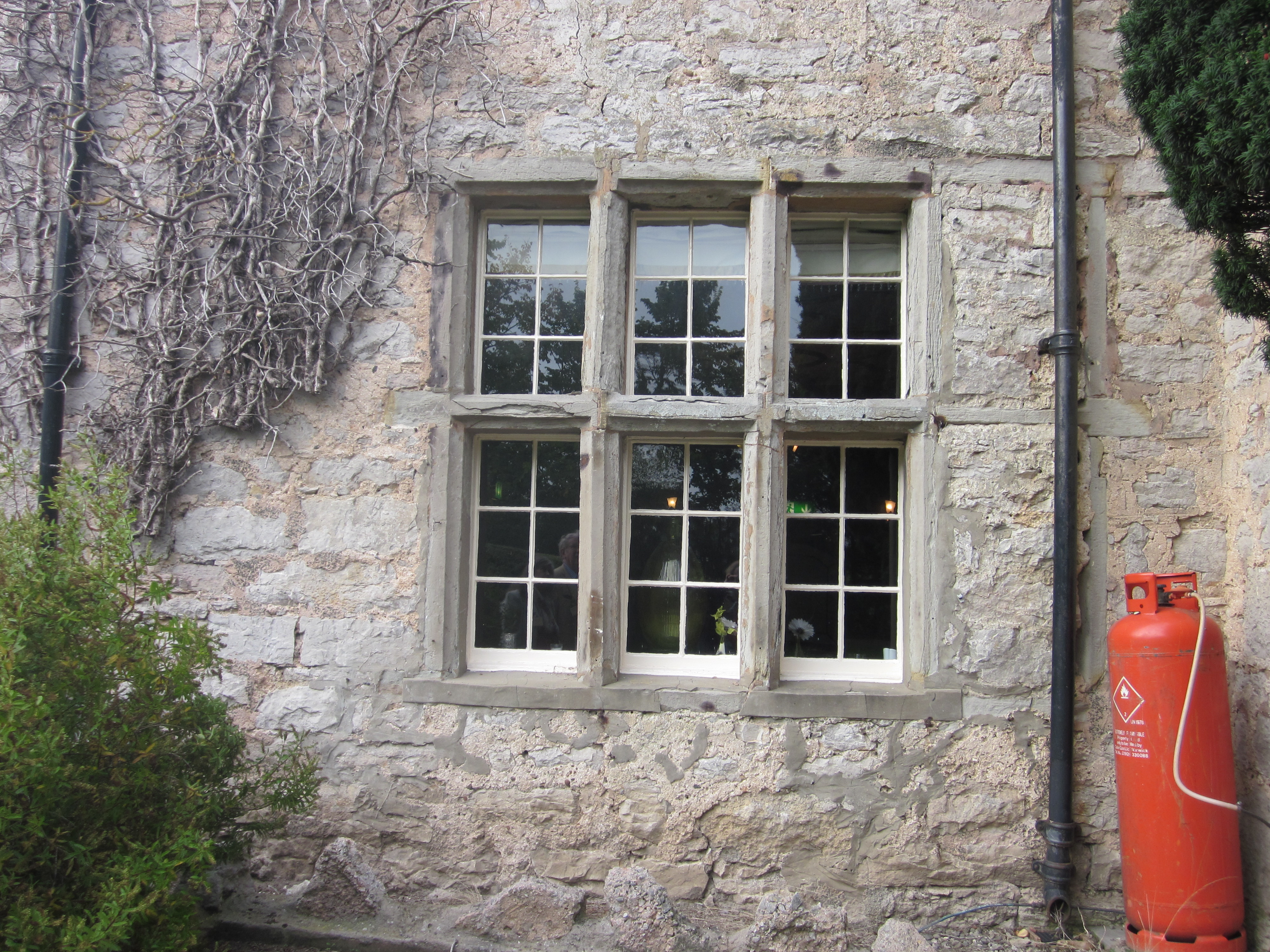
South wing with mullioned window- one pair of windows on right are blocked.

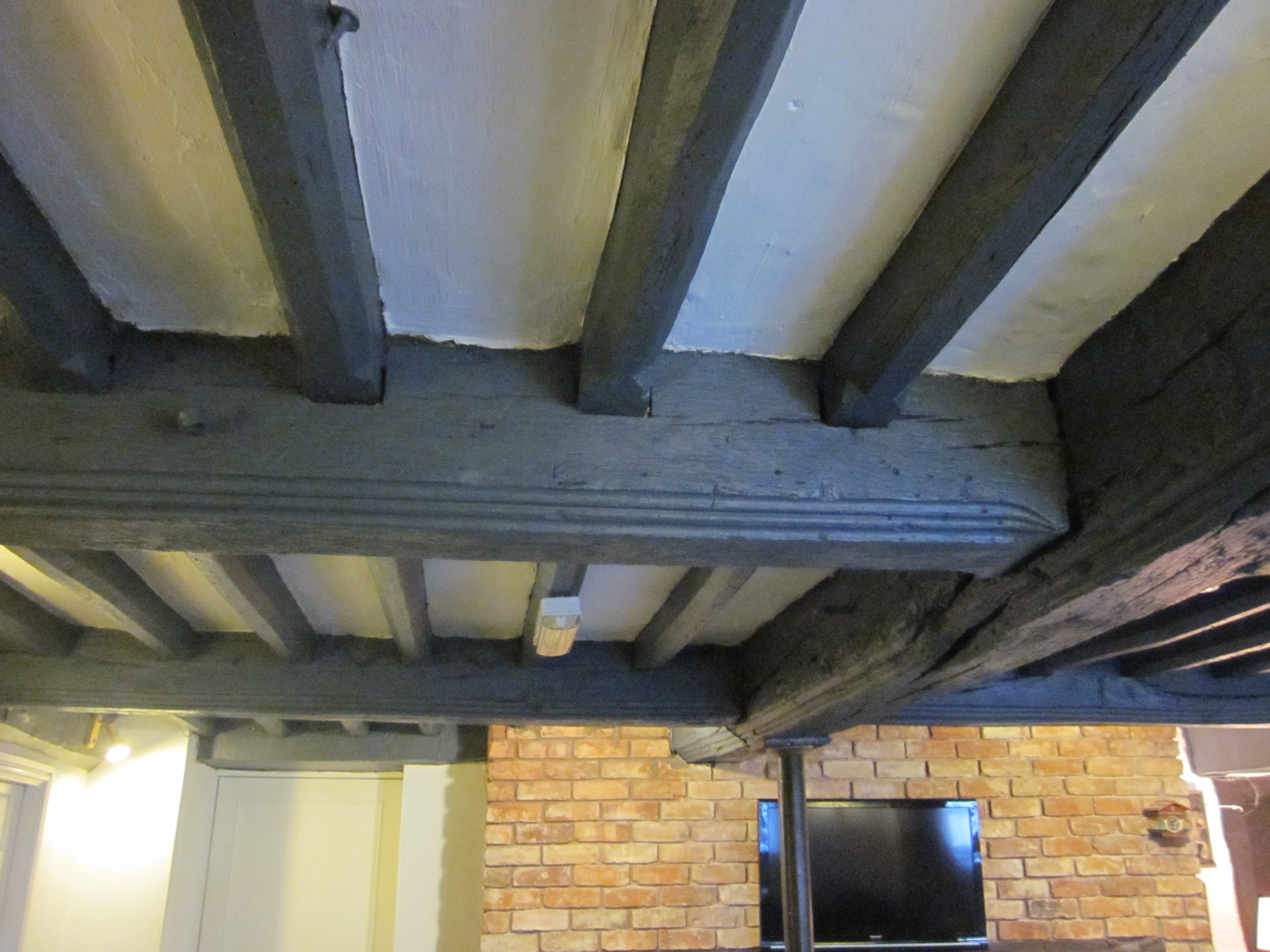
Decorative beam mouldings in building to the north and now linked to main building

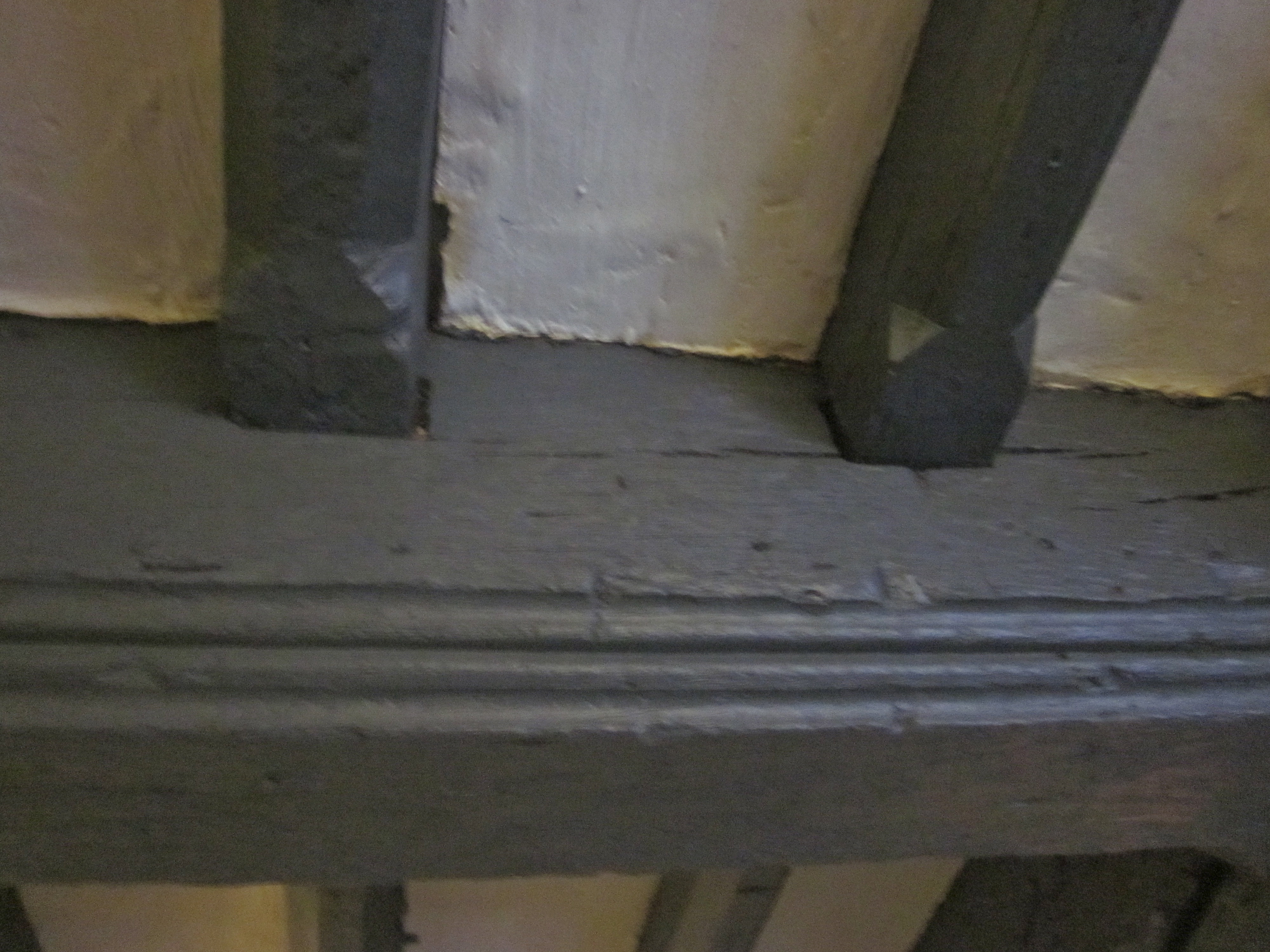
Decorative beam mouldings in building to the north and now linked to main building

== Literature ==
- Bezant Lowe, W. The Heart of North Wales, Vol 2, Llanfairfechan, 1927. 252–4, fig. 194.
- Royal Commission on the Ancient and Historical Monuments of Wales, 1912, Inventory of the County of Flintshire (1912) Item 1;
- E Hubbard, Buildings of Wales: Clwyd. Peguin/Yale U.P., 1986) p. 326-27;
- P Smith, Houses of the Welsh Countryside HMSO (1988) pp. 165, 192; maps 28, 35, 43, 45, 47, 48a, 50, 51;
