= Grade I listed buildings in Cheshire West and Chester =

There are over 9,000 Grade I listed buildings in England. This page is a list of these buildings in the unitary authority of Cheshire West and Chester.

== List of buildings ==
Name	Location	Type	Completed (Note: The date given is the date used by Historic England as significant for the initial building or that of an important part in the structure's description.)	Date designated	Grid ref. (Note: The grid reference is based on the British national grid reference system, sometimes known as OSGB36, used by the Ordnance Survey.) Geo-coordinates	Notes	Entry number (Note: The "List Entry Number" is a unique number assigned to each listed building and scheduled monument by Historic England.)	Image
Aldford Iron Bridge	Aldford	Bridge	1824	4 June 1952	SJ4182960087; 53°08′05″N 2°52′16″W	A bridge designed by Thomas Telford and built by William Hazledine for the 1st Marquis of Westminster. It is built in cast iron and has yellow sandstone abutments forming a single arch. There are cast iron railings, and double gates at the crown of the bridge.	1129943	Aldford Iron Bridge More images
St Peter's Church	Aston-by-Sutton	Church	1695	8 January 1970	SJ5558478464; 53°18′04″N 2°40′04″W	The chancel dates from 1695, and the nave was built between in 1736 and 1740. The interior of the church was altered during the 19th and early 20th centuries, and the church was repaired in 1949–50 following damage by a land mine in 1940. The building is constructed in Runcorn sandstone, and is in Georgian style.	1138491	St Peter's Church More images
Walls of the outer bailey at Beeston Castle	Beeston	Castle	c.1220	1 March 1967	SJ5392159148; 53°07′40″N 2°41′25″W	Built for Ranulf de Blondeville, 6th Earl of Chester, the sandstone castle was damaged in the Civil War. Remaining are the lower courses of the outer bailey. These include the remains of the towers and walls, with a gap at the site of the former gatehouse. The structure is under the care of English Heritage, and the whole site is a scheduled monument.	1130513	Walls of the outer bailey at Beeston Castle More images
Walls, towers and gatehouse of the inner bailey at Beeston Castle	Beeston	Castle	c.1220	1 March 1967	SJ5370059266; 53°07′43″N 2°41′37″W	Built for Ranulf de Blondeville, 6th Earl of Chester, the sandstone castle was damaged in the Civil War. Remaining are the gatehouse with its D-shaped towers, and parts of the curtain walls and its incorporated D-shaped towers. The structure is under the care of English Heritage, and the whole site is a scheduled monument.	1330329	Walls, towers and gatehouse of the inner bailey at Beeston Castle More images
Lower Carden Hall	Carden	House	15th century or earlier	22 October 1952	SJ4602252230; 53°03′49″N 2°48′11″W	The hall was later enlarged and otherwise altered. It is basically timber-framed, with plaster panels on a sandstone plinth. The hall is in two storeys, with slate roofs and casement windows. There are large elaborate brick chimneystacks. In about 1984 the hall was restored, with a brick inner skin and steelwork.	1229918	Lower Carden Hall More images
A Block	Chester Castle	Castle	Dated 1810	26 February 1985	SJ4049265859; 53°11′10″N 2°53′26″W		1271824	A Block More images
Agricola Tower	Chester Castle	Castle	Late 12th or early 13th century	26 February 1985	SJ4048265740; 53°11′06″N 2°53′27″W		1271825	Agricola Tower More images
Assize Courts Block	Chester Castle	Prison	1788–1801	1 June 1967	SJ4050365795; 53°11′08″N 2°53′26″W		1271823	Assize Courts Block More images
B Block	Chester Castle	Gate	1804	26 February 1985	SJ4044665762; 53°11′07″N 2°53′29″W		1245520	B Block More images
Curtain wall to west and south west of inner bailey, Chester Castle	Chester Castle	Wall	After 1246	1 June 1967	SJ4043065741; 53°11′06″N 2°53′30″W		1245537	Curtain wall to west and south west of inner bailey, Chester Castle More images
Propylaea	Chester Castle	Gate	1811–13	1 June 1967	SJ4040365841; 53°11′10″N 2°53′31″W		1271822	Propylaea More images
St Edith's Church	Church Shocklach	Church	c. 1150	1 March 1967	SJ4318050180; 53°02′45″N 2°50′56″W	This is one of the oldest ecclesiastical buildings in Cheshire, and has a Norman doorway. The chancel and chancel arch date from the early 14th century, the ceiling was added in 1813 and the belfry was built in 1815. During a restoration in 1974 a semicircular window was added to the west wall.	1228322	St Edith's Church More images
Eaton Chapel north of Eaton Hall	Eaton Park, Eaton	Chapel	1873–84	2 November 1983	SJ4139160776; 53°08′27″N 2°52′39″W	A private chapel, with a clock tower, designed by Alfred Waterhouse for the 1st Duke of Westminster. It is built in sandstone with a slate roof, and consists of a nave and an apsed chancel. Inside is a gallery over a narthex, mosaics, an effigy of Constance, Duchess of Westminster, by Joseph Boehm, marble fittings and furniture, and stained glass.	1330615	Eaton Chapel north of Eaton Hall More images
Golden Gates and overthrow, screens and pair of wing lodges at Eaton Hall	Eaton Park, Eaton	Gate	Early 18th century	4 June 1952	SJ4128860722; 53°08′25″N 2°52′45″W	The central pair of gates and the adjacent screen railings are by Robert and John Davies of Croes Foel. In about 1880 further side gates and screens, and a pair of lodges were added, all of which were designed by Alfred Waterhouse. The gates and screens are in wrought iron, and are painted black and gold. The lodges are in stone, they are in French Renaissance style, and each consists of a single chamber.	1136138	Golden Gates and overthrow, screens and pair of wing lodges at Eaton Hall More images
Church of St Mary	Eccleston	Church	1899	1 June 1967	SJ4129062632; 53°09′26″N 2°52′41″W		1138410	Church of St Mary More images
Farndon Bridge	Farndon	Bridge	1339	1 March 1967	SJ4117354412; 53°05′01″N 2°52′47″W	The road bridge crosses the River Dee between the villages of Farndon and Holt, and is partly in Wales. It is constructed in sandstone, and consists of eight arches, five of which are cross the river. The bridge is also a scheduled monument.	1279428	Farndon Bridge More images
Church of St Lawrence	Frodsham	Church	Late 12th century	8 January 1970	SJ5212277293; 53°17′26″N 2°43′11″W	The parish church of Frodsham stands in an elevated position to the east of the centre of the town. A church has been present on the site since the late 11th century. The fabric of the present church dates from the late 12th century, and its interior has arcades containing Norman material. The tower dates from the 14th century. In the 1880s there was some rebuilding of the interior by Bodley and Garner.	1253193	Church of St Lawrence More images
Belmont Hall	Great Budworth	Country house	1775	4 March 1969	SJ6548578340; 53°18′04″N 2°31′11″W	Designed as a country house, and designed by James Gibbs, although changes were made to the design during construction. It is built in brown brick and has a slate roof. The entrance façade is symmetrical with seven bays and three storeys. Internally there is fine plaster decoration in Rococo style. As of 2013 the building is occupied by Cransley School.	1139129	Belmont Hall More images
St Mary and All Saints' Church	Great Budworth	Church	14th century	8 January 1970	SJ6648577523; 53°17′37″N 2°30′16″W	The oldest part of the church is the Lady chapel, dating from the 14th century, with the rest of the church being built in the following two centuries. Alterations were carried out during the 19th century by various architects, including Anthony Salvin, William Butterfield and John Douglas, when the church's major benefactor was Rowland Egerton-Warburton of Arley Hall. It is constructed in sandstone, and its architectural style is Perpendicular.	1139156	St Mary and All Saints' Church More images
Ince Manor	Ince	House	Late 13th century	26 September 1963	SJ4493376548; 53°16′59″N 2°49′38″W	This consists of a group of buildings which were formerly a monastic grange. The remaining buildings are in two blocks, the old hall (pictured) and the monastic cottages, forming two sides of a courtyard. They are built in sandstone. The hall has an arched doorway, and mullioned and transomed windows. The cottages had become derelict towards the end of the 20th century, but have been restored. They have rectangular doorways and windows. The former grange is also a scheduled monument.	1138810	Ince Manor More images
Church of St Oswald	Malpas	Church	Late 14th century	1 March 1967	SJ4864447189; 53°01′09″N 2°45′56″W		1135959	Church of St Oswald More images
St Peter's Church	Plemstall, Mickle Trafford	Church	15th century	1 June 1967	SJ4571070092; 53°13′30″N 2°48′53″W	The church stands in an isolated position, and is built in sandstone with slate roofs. It is in Perpendicular style. The tower, with its embattled parapet, and crocketed finials, was added in 1826. The church consists of a nave and chancel in one range, a north aisle, a south porch, and a west tower. Many of the furnishings inside the church were carved by a former incumbent.	1279021	St Peter's Church More images
St Oswald's Church	Lower Peover	Church	Late 14th century	3 January 1967	SJ7432174167; 53°15′50″N 2°23′11″W	The nave and chancel date probably from the late 14th and 15th centuries, the west tower was added in 1582, and the aisles were altered and re-roofed in 1852 by Anthony Salvin. The body of the church is timber-framed, and the tower is in sandstone.	1139104	St Oswald's Church More images
St Helen's Church	Northwich	Church	14th century	24 March 1950	SJ6643673805; 53°15′37″N 2°30′17″W	Additions were made in the 15th and 16th centuries. During the 19th century there was a series of restorations, the last in 1883–86 when Paley and Austin also widened the north aisle, added a vestry and created a baptistry. The church is constructed in sandstone. It has a west tower and a canted east end.	1329880	St Helen's Church More images
Winnington Hall	Northwich	Country house	c. 1600	24 March 1950	SJ6450574749; 53°16′07″N 2°32′01″W	This originated as a timber-framed country house. An additional stone wing was added in 1775 by Samuel Wyatt. During the 19th century it was used as a school, until in 1872 it was bought by Sir John Brunner and Ludwig Mond who each lived in a wing. After the First World War it was converted into a club for the use of the workers at the local chemical works, and has since has been made into offices.	1310245	Winnington Hall More images
Abbey Gate College Gatehouse	Saighton	Gateway	1490	1 June 1967	SJ4430761793; 53°09′00″N 2°49′58″W		1138394	Abbey Gate College Gatehouse
Church of St Michael	Shotwick	Church	Late 11th century	1 June 1967	SJ3367971771; 53°14′19″N 2°59′38″W		1145903	Church of St Michael More images
Sutton Hall	Sutton	House	15th century	8 January 1970	SJ5448679081; 53°18′24″N 2°41′04″W	The hall was extended later. Externally it is constructed in brown brick. The hall has two storeys and attics, and contains timber-framed medieval halls that were encased in brick in the 18th century.	1253572	Sutton Hall More images
Church of St Andrew	Tarvin	Church	Late 14th century	1 March 1967	SJ4918966963; 53°11′49″N 2°45′38″W		1330302	Church of St Andrew More images
Church of St Mary	Thornton-le-Moors	Church	14th century onwards	1 June 1967	SJ4415774550; 53°15′53″N 2°50′14″W		1330242	Church of St Mary More images
Chapel of St Chad	Tushingham cum Grindley	Chapel of ease	1689–91	1 March 1967	SJ5275046283; 53°00′41″N 2°42′16″W		1130605	Chapel of St Chad More images
Utkinton Hall	Utkinton	Farmhouse	Medieval	10 March 1953	SJ5532664616; 53°10′37″N 2°40′14″W	This former manor house has a medieval core, but most of the present house dates from the 17th and 18th centuries, since when it has been reduced in size. What remains is an L-shaped building in sandstone and brick, with slate roofs. It includes a row of four gables, one of which is timber-framed.	1329835	Utkinton Hall More images
St Mary's Church	Weaverham	Church	Mid-15th century	3 January 1967	SJ6169174237; 53°15′50″N 2°34′33″W	A church has been present on the site since before the Norman conquest. The oldest part of the present church is the tower, with the rest dating from the 16th century. It was restored in 1855 by Anthony Salvin, and in 1877 by John Douglas. Its style is late Perpendicular. The font consists of a 13th-century column carrying a bowl from the 14th or 15th century, and a Jacobean cover.	1287233	St Mary's Church More images
Abbey Gateway	Chester	Gatehouse	c.1300	28 July 1955	SJ4050266487; 53°11′31″N 2°53′26″W		1376366	Abbey Gateway More images
Barnaby's Tower	Chester	Tower	Probably 13th century	28 July 1955	SJ4079465987; 53°11′15″N 2°53′10″W		1376168	Barnaby's Tower More images
Bear and Billet Public House	Chester	Jettied house	1664	28 July 1955	SJ4064465831; 53°11′09″N 2°53′18″W		1376318	Bear and Billet Public House More images
Bonewaldesthorne Tower	Chester	Angle tower	1249–61	28 July 1955	SJ4003866552; 53°11′33″N 2°53′51″W		1376128	Bonewaldesthorne Tower More images
Cathedral Church of Christ and the Blessed Virgin Mary	Chester	Cathedral	c.1100	28 July 1955	SJ4060066446; 53°11′29″N 2°53′21″W		1376398	Cathedral Church of Christ and the Blessed Virgin Mary More images
Chester weir and salmon leap	River Dee, Chester	Weir	1093	23 July 1998	SJ4076765828; 53°11′09″N 2°53′12″W		1375691	Chester weir and salmon leap More images
Church of St John the Baptist	Chester	Church	Late 11th century	28 July 1955	SJ4092266138; 53°11′20″N 2°53′03″W		1375977	Church of St John the Baptist More images
Church of St Peter	Chester	Church	14th century onwards	28 July 1955	SJ4052666300; 53°11′25″N 2°53′25″W		1376247	Church of St Peter More images
City Wall from Bonewaldesthorne Tower to Pemberton's Parlour	Chester	Wall	Late 11th–early 12th century	28 July 1955	SJ4012166578; 53°11′33″N 2°53′47″W		1376130	City Wall from Bonewaldesthorne Tower to Pemberton's Parlour More images
Falcon Inn	Chester	Jettied house	16th century	28 July 1955	SJ4056066060; 53°11′17″N 2°53′23″W		1376292	Falcon Inn More images
Former monastic buildings to Cathedral Church of Christ and the Blessed Virgin	Chester	Abbey	Early 12th century	28 July 1955	SJ4058366490; 53°11′31″N 2°53′22″W		1376397	Former monastic buildings to Cathedral Church of Christ and the Blessed Virgin More images
Grosvenor Bridge	Chester	Road bridge	1827–33	28 July 1955	SJ4021665546; 53°11′00″N 2°53′41″W		1375839	Grosvenor Bridge More images
Kaleyard Gate	Chester	Town gate	c.1275	28 July 1955	SJ4065866536; 53°11′33″N 2°53′23″W		1376161	Kaleyard Gate More images
Morgan's Mount	Chester	Gun emplacement	1640s	28 July 1955	SJ4024266626; 53°11′35″N 2°53′40″W		1376134	Morgan's Mount More images
Cowper House – Nos. 10 (Row) and 12 (Street), Bridge St.	Chester	Town house	13th century	28 July 1955	SJ4050766244; 53°11′23″N 2°53′26″W		1376063	Cowper House – Nos. 10 (Row) and 12 (Street), Bridge St. More images
Old Crypt – Nos. 11 (Street) and 15 and 15a (Row), Watergate St.	Chester	Town house	c.1300	18 July 1955	SJ4047766256; 53°11′23″N 2°53′27″W		1376424	Old Crypt – Nos. 11 (Street) and 15 and 15a (Row), Watergate St. More images
Leche House – Nos. 17 (Street) and 21 (Row), Watergate St.	Chester	Galleried row house	Late 15th century	28 July 1955	SJ4046166250; 53°11′23″N 2°53′28″W		1376427	Leche House – Nos. 17 (Street) and 21 (Row), Watergate St. More images
Crypt Building – Nos. 28 (Street) and 34 (Row), Eastgate St.	Chester	Town house	c.1300	28 July 1955	SJ4061166290; 53°11′24″N 2°53′20″W		1376232	Crypt Building – Nos. 28 (Street) and 34 (Row), Eastgate St. More images
St Ursula's – Nos. 37 (Street) and 45 (Row), Watergate St.	Chester	Galleried row house	c.1180–1280	28 July 1955	SJ4041466232; 53°11′22″N 2°53′31″W		1376436	St Ursula's – Nos. 37 (Street) and 45 (Row), Watergate St. More images
No. 39 Bridge Street	Chester	Bath house	2nd century Roman	28 July 1955	SJ4056166172; 53°11′22″N 2°53′28″W		1376085	No. 39 Bridge Street More images
Bishop Lloyd's House – No. 41 (Street) and 51 and 53 (Row), Watergate St.	Chester	Apartment	Medieval	28 July 1955	SJ4040066232; 53°11′24″N 2°53′36″W		1376439	Bishop Lloyd's House – No. 41 (Street) and 51 and 53 (Row), Watergate St. More images
Three Old Arches – Nos. 48 and 50 (Street) and 48, 50 and 52 (Row), Bridge St.	Chester	Town house	c.1200 and later	10 January 1972	SJ4053566121; 53°11′19″N 2°53′24″W		1376095	Three Old Arches – Nos. 48 and 50 (Street) and 48, 50 and 52 (Row), Bridge St. More images
Blue Bell – Nos. 63 and 65, Northgate St.	Chester	Timber-framed house	Mid–late C15	28 July 1955	SJ4042466617; 53°11′35″N 2°53′31″W		1376358	Blue Bell – Nos. 63 and 65, Northgate St. More images
Booth Mansion – Nos. 28–34 (Street) and 28 and 30 (Row), Watergate St.	Chester	Galleried row house	1700	28 July 1955	SJ4042966276; 53°11′24″N 2°53′30″W		1376434	Booth Mansion – Nos. 28–34 (Street) and 28 and 30 (Row), Watergate St. More images
Old Dee Bridge	Chester	Road bridge	Late 14th century	28 July 1955	SJ4071765745; 53°11′07″N 2°53′14″W		1375850	Old Dee Bridge More images
Part of City Wall between Morgan's Mount and Northgate	Chester	Wall	1702–08	28 July 1955	SJ4032566648; 53°11′36″N 2°53′36″W		1376135	Part of City Wall between Morgan's Mount and Northgate More images
Part of City Wall from Barnaby's Tower to tower east of Bridgegate	Chester	Wall	1702–08	28 July 1955	SJ4076365917; 53°11′12″N 2°53′12″W		1376169	Part of City Wall from Barnaby's Tower to tower east of Bridgegate More images
Part of City Wall from County Hall (not included) to Grosvenor Road	Chester	Wall	Late 11th to early 12th century	28 July 1955	SJ4042965662; 53°11′04″N 2°53′30″W		1376174	Part of City Wall from County Hall (not included) to Grosvenor Road More images
Part of City Wall from Eastgate to Thimbleby's Tower and attached gravestones	Chester	Wall	Late 1st to early 2nd century	28 July 1955	SJ4071666311; 53°11′25″N 2°53′15″W		1376163	Part of City Wall from Eastgate to Thimbleby's Tower and attached gravestones More images
Part of City Wall from Grosvenor Road to the Watergate	Chester	Wall	1702–08	28 July 1955	SJ4026365841; 53°11′10″N 2°53′39″W		1376175	Part of City Wall from Grosvenor Road to the Watergate More images
Part of City Wall from Northgate to Phoenix Tower	Chester	Wall	1702–08	28 July 1955	SJ4050466699; 53°11′38″N 2°53′26″W		1376136	Part of City Wall from Northgate to Phoenix Tower More images
Part of City Wall from Pemberton's Parlour to St Martin's Gate (not included)	Chester	Wall	1702–08	28 July 1955	SJ4017466596; 53°11′34″N 2°53′44″W		1376132	Part of City Wall from Pemberton's Parlour to St Martin's Gate (not included) More images
Part of City Wall from Phoenix Tower to Kaleyard Gate	Chester	Wall	1702–08	28 July 1955	SJ4062166671; 53°11′37″N 2°53′20″W		1376158	Part of City Wall from Phoenix Tower to Kaleyard Gate More images
Part of City Wall from St Martin's Gate (not included) to Morgan's Mount	Chester	Wall	1702–08	28 July 1955	SJ4023166619; 53°11′35″N 2°53′41″W		1376133	Part of City Wall from St Martin's Gate (not included) to Morgan's Mount More images
Part of City Wall from the Newgate to Barnaby's Tower	Chester	Wall	1702–08	28 July 1955	SJ4077066071; 53°11′17″N 2°53′12″W		1376167	Part of City Wall from the Newgate to Barnaby's Tower More images
Part of City Wall from the Watergate to Bonewaldesthorne Tower	Chester	Wall	1702–08	28 July 1955	SJ4009366383; 53°11′27″N 2°53′48″W		1376176	Part of City Wall from the Watergate to Bonewaldesthorne Tower More images
Part of City Wall from Thimbleby's Tower to Old Newgate	Chester	Wall	1702–08	28 July 1955	SJ4074966175; 53°11′21″N 2°53′13″W		1376165	Part of City Wall from Thimbleby's Tower to Old Newgate More images
Part of City Wall with tower base from Kaleyard Gate to Eastgate	Chester	Wall	1702–08	28 July 1955	SJ4066966492; 53°11′31″N 2°53′17″W		1376162	Part of City Wall with tower base from Kaleyard Gate to Eastgate More images
Part of City Walls from Bridgegate to drum tower 50 metres east	Chester	Wall	1702–08	28 July 1955	SJ4070365842; 53°11′10″N 2°53′15″W		1376172	Part of City Walls from Bridgegate to drum tower 50 metres east More images
Pemberton's Parlour (aka Goblin Tower)	Chester	Gate	After 1708	28 July 1955	SJ4015366590; 53°11′34″N 2°53′45″W		1376131	Pemberton's Parlour (aka Goblin Tower) More images
Phoenix Tower (aka King Charles' Tower)	Chester	Angle tower	13th century	28 July 1955	SJ4061066712; 53°11′38″N 2°53′21″W		1376157	Phoenix Tower (aka King Charles' Tower) More images
Recorder's Steps	Chester	Steps	1820–22	28 July 1955	SJ4077065921; 53°11′12″N 2°53′11″W		1376170	Recorder's Steps More images
Remains of Roman Amphitheatre	Chester	Amphitheatre	2nd century Roman	10 January 1972	SJ4082366192; 53°11′21″N 2°53′09″W		1375863	Remains of Roman Amphitheatre More images
Roman shrine to Minerva	Chester	Shrine	Early 2nd century Roman	28 July 1955	SJ4066765613; 53°11′02″N 2°53′17″W		1375783	Roman shrine to Minerva More images
South-east angle tower and wall of Roman legionary fortress	Chester	Angle tower	Late 1st–early 2nd century Roman	10 January 1972	SJ4075166165; 53°11′20″N 2°53′13″W		1376166	South-east angle tower and wall of Roman legionary fortress More images
Spur Wall and Water Tower	Chester	Tower	1322–26	28 July 1955	SJ3999766544; 53°11′32″N 2°53′53″W		1376129	Spur Wall and Water Tower More images
St Mary's Centre	Chester	Church	14th century	28 July 1955	SJ4055365844; 53°11′10″N 2°53′23″W		1376382	St Mary's Centre More images
The Bridgegate	Chester	Archway	1781–82	28 July 1955	SJ4067565829; 53°11′09″N 2°53′16″W		1376320	The Bridgegate More images
The Eastgate	Chester	Archway	1768–69	28 July 1955	SJ4071166343; 53°11′26″N 2°53′15″W		1376249	The Eastgate More images
The Northgate	Chester	Archway	1810	28 July 1955	SJ4041166674; 53°11′37″N 2°53′31″W		1376370	The Northgate More images
The Watergate	Chester	Archway	1857	28 July 1955	SJ4013766184; 53°11′21″N 2°53′46″W		1376468	The Watergate More images
Thimbleby's Tower	Chester	Angle tower	13th century	28 July 1955	SJ4075166183; 53°11′21″N 2°53′13″W		1376164	Thimbleby's Tower More images
Unnamed drum tower 50 metres east of the Bridgegate	Chester	Tower	1702–08	28 July 1955	SJ4071365846; 53°11′10″N 2°53′14″W		1376171	Unnamed drum tower 50 metres east of the Bridgegate More images

== See also ==
- Grade I listed buildings in Cheshire
  - Grade I listed buildings in Cheshire West and Chester
  - Grade I listed buildings in Cheshire East
  - Grade I listed buildings in Warrington
  - Grade I listed buildings in Halton (borough)
- Grade II listed buildings in Chester
- Grade II* listed buildings in Cheshire West and Chester
