= Saint Ursula (disambiguation) =

Saint Ursula is a 4th century Christian saint.

Saint Ursula, St. Ursula, St Ursula or St Ursula's may also refer to:

== Other Catholic saints ==
- Ursula Ledóchowska (1865–1939), Polish nun

== Catholic schools ==
=== Australia ===
- Saint Ursula's College, Armidale, New South Wales, amalgamated to form O'Connor Catholic College in 1975
- Saint Ursula's College, Kingsgrove, Sydney, New South Wales, Australia, a girls' school
- St Ursula's College, Toowoomba, Queensland, Australia, a private secondary girls' school
- St Ursula's College, Yeppoon, Queensland, Australia, a day and boarding high school

=== Indonesia ===
- St. Ursula Catholic School, Jakarta, Indonesia, a girls' school
- St. Ursula School Bumi Serpong Damai, South Tangerang, Indonesia, a private school

=== United Kingdom ===
- St Ursula's School, Westbury-on-Trym, Bristol, England, a private school
- St Ursula's Convent School, Greenwich, London, England, a girls' secondary school

=== United States ===
- St. Ursula Academy (Cincinnati, Ohio), United States, a girls' college preparatory school
- St. Ursula Academy (Toledo, Ohio), United States, a girls' college preparatory school

== Other uses ==
- Mount St. Ursula, a peak in northern Slovenia
- Basilica of St. Ursula, Cologne, Germany
- St Ursula's Church, Berne, Switzerland, an Anglican Episcopal church
- St Ursula's, Chester, Cheshire, England, a designated Grade I listed building

== See also ==
- Úrsula Micaela Morata, a beatified nun, reputed to have bilocated
- Santa Úrsula, a town and a municipality on the north coast of Tenerife
- Church of Sant'Orsola (Mantua), Italy
