= Booth Mansion =

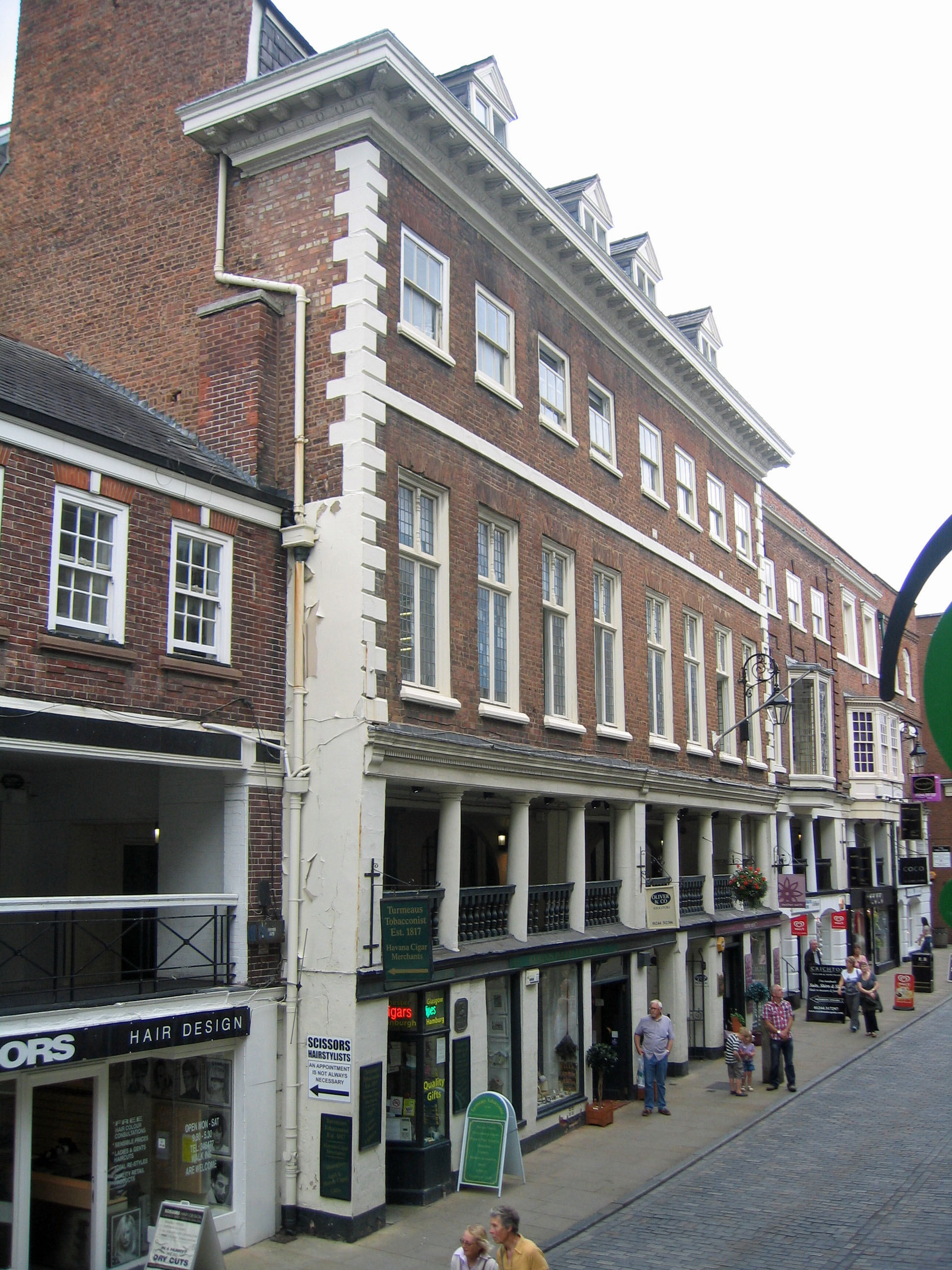
- Booth Mansion

- Location in Cheshire
- 53.19011°N 2.89295°W
- Location: 28–34 Watergate Street, Chester, Cheshire, England
- OS grid reference: SJ 404 662

History
- Built: 1700
- Built for: George Booth

Site notes
- Architectural style: Georgian

Listed Building – Grade I
- Official name: Nos.28-34 (even) Street and Nos.28 & 30 Row (Booth Mansion)
- Designated: 28 July 1958

Booth Mansion is a former town house at 28–34 Watergate Street, Chester, Cheshire, England. It contains a portion of the Chester Rows, is recorded in the National Heritage List for England as a designated Grade I listed building, and is included in the English Heritage Archive. Its frontage was built in 1700 in Georgian style but much medieval material remains behind it.

== History ==
In 1700 George Booth rebuilt two medieval houses as his town house. He built a frontage in Georgian style, but behind this much of the medieval fabric was retained. The frontage was angled into the street so that the house could be seen better from Chester Cross; however as a result of this he was fined £10 for encroaching into the street. In the 1740s and 1750s the building was used as the assembly rooms for the town's social functions. Subsequently, it has been used as an auction gallery and, as of 2010, houses a firm of solicitors.

== Architecture ==
At a time when buildings elsewhere in the town had enclosed their portion of the Rows, the architect designing the frontage of Booth Mansion retained its section of the Row. The frontage is built in brick with stone quoins; it has eight bays and two storeys. Behind the frontage is medieval stonework and timber; the roof is of grey slates. At the street (undercroft) level are shop fronts and doorways between nine stone piers. At the Row level, overlooking the street, are three piers and six Tuscan columns. In the storey above the row are eight tall windows, each with four leaded lights, above which is a string course. The top storey has eight six-light sash windows. Above these is a cornice and, from the roof, four gabled dormers with two-pane casement windows protrude.

=== Interior ===
In the undercroft is a medieval stone arcade and a wooden joist which has been dated by dendrochronology to 1260–80. At the level of the Row, a 13th-century oak doorway remains from the medieval hall. In the storey above the Row is the 18th-century assembly room which measures 16 by 10 metres (52 by 33 ft) and stretches across the full width of the building. The room is panelled and has a fireplace against the east wall. Elsewhere the medieval details of rooms has been obscured by modern additions.

== See also ==
- Grade I listed buildings in Cheshire West and Chester
