= Blue Bell, Chester =

Grade I listed pub in Cheshire, England

Blue Bell
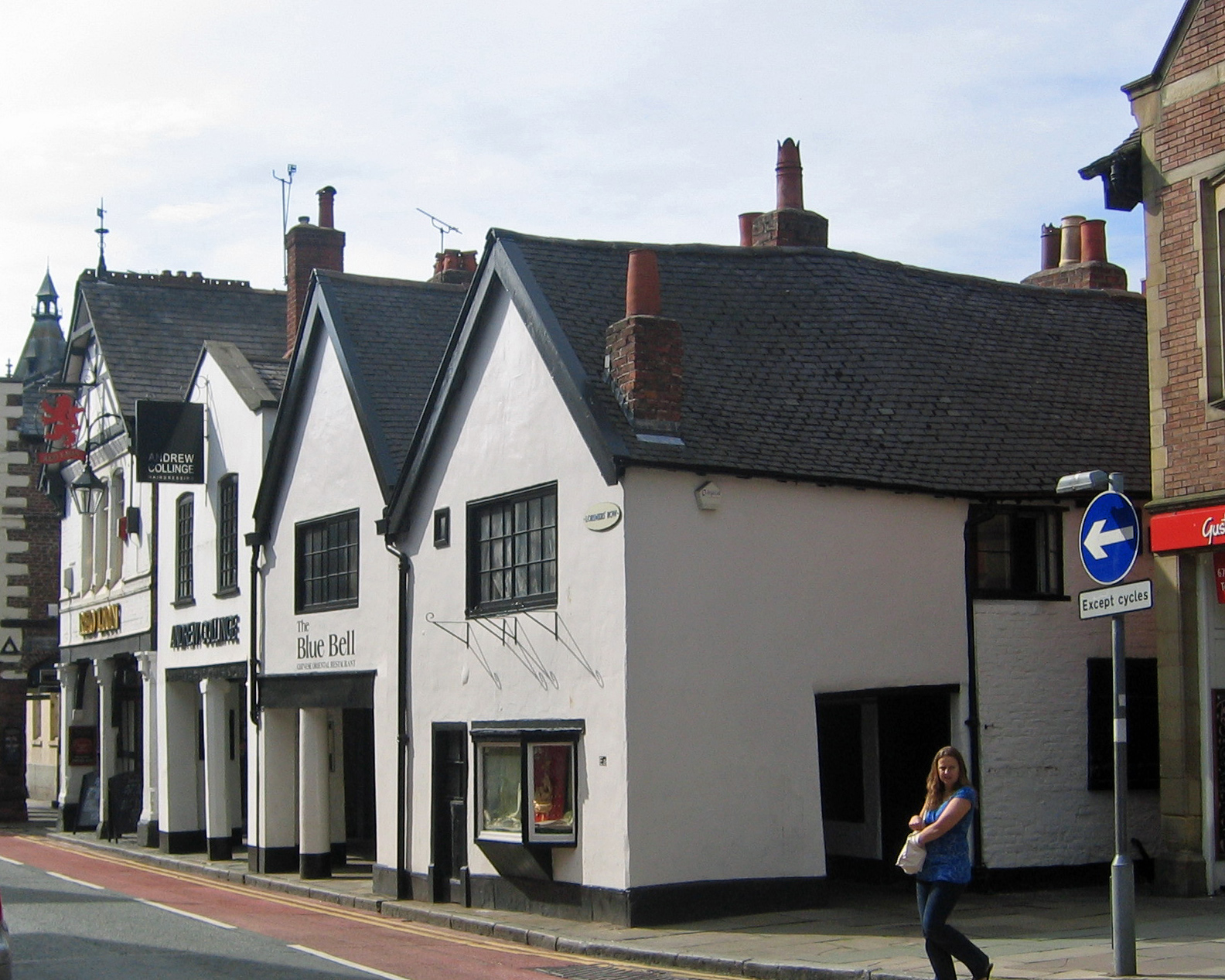
- Blue Bell from the northeast

- Location in Cheshire
- 53.1933°N 2.8931°W
- Location: 63–65 Northgate Street, Chester, Cheshire, England
- OS grid reference: SJ404666

History
- Built: Mid-late 15th century

Listed Building – Grade I
- Official name: Nos 63 & 65 (formerly Old Bluebell Inn)
- Designated: 28 July 1955

The Blue Bell is at 63–65 Northgate Street, Chester, Cheshire, England. It is recorded in the National Heritage List for England as a designated Grade I listed building. Originally it consisted of two medieval houses, which were joined in the 18th century. The pavement runs through the ground floor storey of the northern part of the building, leaving a separate cabin or chamber between the pavement and the road.

== History ==
The building dates from the mid- to late 15th century, and is said to be the oldest surviving intact medieval house in Chester. It was originally two houses, which were joined in the 18th century. It formed part of Lorimer's Row, a group of buildings with an arcade at ground level, as distinct from the Rows in the centre of the city whose walkways are at the first floor level. From an early date, the south part of the building has been an inn, its first licence possibly dating from 1494. The separate cabin or chamber has been used for a number of functions; these include being a ticket office for stage coach operators in the 18th century and in the 20th century a soda fountain bar and a barber's shop. In the 19th century the southern part of the building was an inn while the northern part housed a shop. The inn closed in the 1930s. In 1948 the building was used as an antique shop but its condition deteriorated so much that it was threatened with demolition. In the 1950s the Chester Civic Trust campaigned for its survival; it was restored and has since been used as a clothes shop and, more recently, as a restaurant.

== Architecture ==
The building is timber-framed on a sandstone plinth with brickwork added later, which has subsequently been rendered and painted. The roofs are of grey slates. The two buildings comprising the whole have separate frames, each with roofs leading to gables over the street. At ground level the southern part of the building has an arcade open to the street with a pier to the south and an octagonal column south of the centre. The northern part has a separate cabin or chamber adjacent to the street with the walkway between its rear and the rest of the building. On the street side of the chamber are a three-pane canted oriel window and a door. On the upper floor each part of the building has a horizontal window with a small one-paned window between them.

== See also ==
- Grade I listed buildings in Cheshire West and Chester
