= Newgate, Chester =

Arch bridge in Chester, England

Coordinates: 53.18902°N 2.88819°W

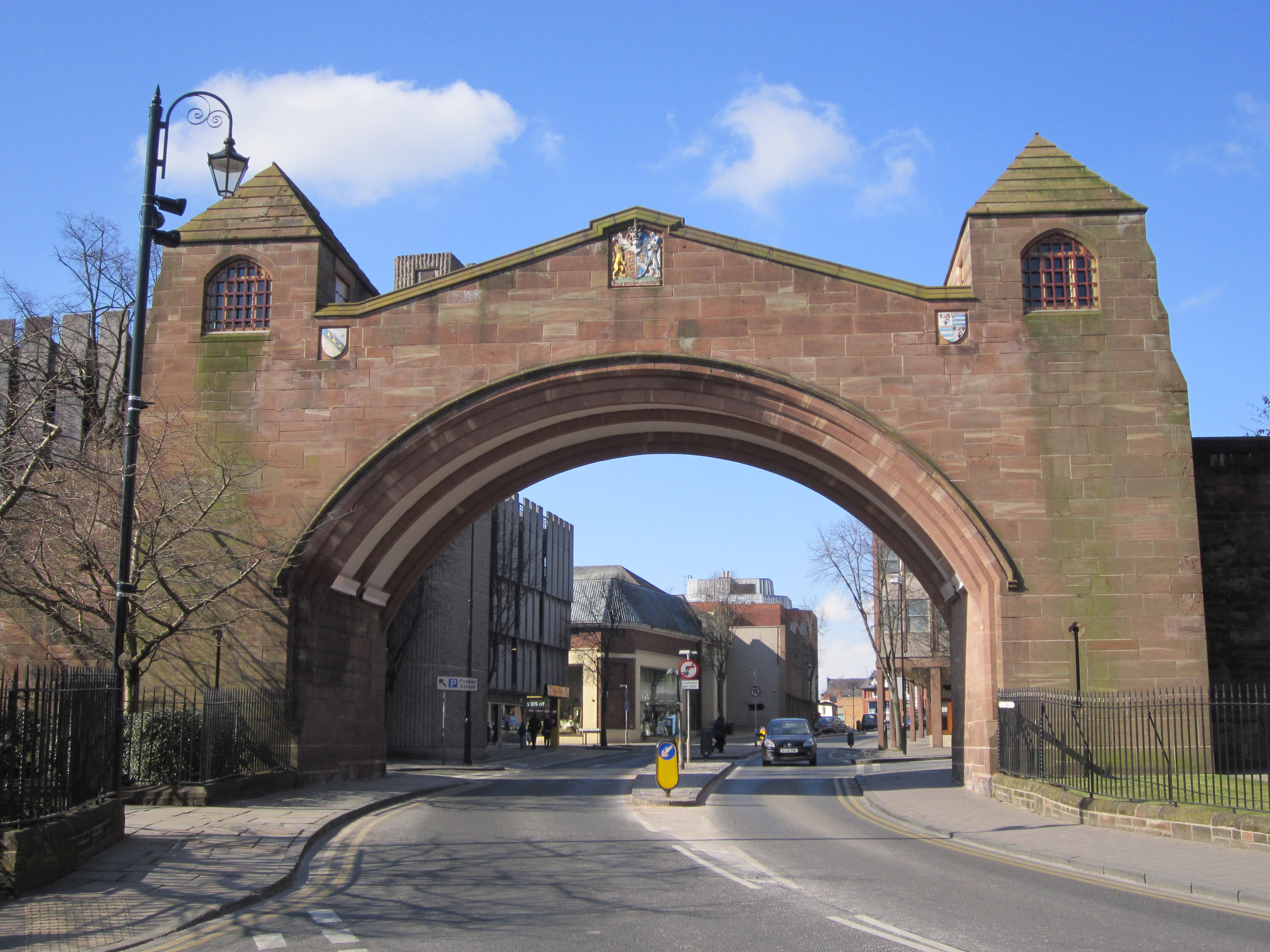
Newgate

Map of central Chester, showing the line of the city walls and the gates, towers and wall sections of the medieval and post-medieval city.

[Hide/Show the list of Gates, Towers and Wall sections]
1 Bonewaldesthorne's Tower
2 Spur Wall and Water Tower
3 Wall between Bonewaldesthorne's Tower and Pemberton's Parlour
4 Pemberton's Parlour
5 Wall between Pemberton's Parlour and St Martin's Gate
6 St Martin's Gate
7 Wall between St Martin's Gate and Morgan's Mount
8 Morgan's Mount
9 Wall between Morgan's Mount and Northgate
10 Northgate
11 Wall between Northgate and Phoenix Tower
12 Phoenix Tower
13 Wall between Phoenix Tower and Kaleyard Gate
14 Kaleyard Gate
15 Wall between Kaleyard Gate and Eastgate
16 Eastgate
17 Wall between Eastgate and Thimbleby's Tower
18 Thimbleby's Tower
19 Wall between Thimbleby's Tower and Old Newgate
20 Old Newgate
21 Newgate
22 Wall between Newgate and Barnaby's Tower
23 Barnaby's Tower
24 Wall between Barnaby's Tower and the Drum Tower
25 Recorder's Steps
26 Drum Tower
27 Wall between the Drum Tower and Bridgegate
28 Bridgegate
29 Wall between Bridgegate and the former County Hall
30 Wall between former County Hall and Grosvenor Road
31 Wall between Grosvenor Road and Watergate
32 Watergate
33 Wall between Watergate and Bonewaldesthorne's Tower

Newgate is an arch bridge carrying the walkway of the city walls over Pepper Street in Chester, Cheshire, England. It is recorded in the National Heritage List for England as a designated Grade II listed building. The bridge was built in 1937–38 to relieve traffic congestion in the city, especially at Chester Cross. This involved making a new breach in the city walls.

The bridge is constructed in red sandstone. It was designed by Sir Walter Tapper and his son, Michael. On each side of the bridge is a tower containing mock loops (unglazed slit windows) and surmounted by hipped roofs. Flights of steps on each side lead up to the towers and to the walkway across the top of the bridge. The structure is decorated with carved shields and Tudor roses. The historian Simon Ward expresses the opinion that "its design conformed to the generally medieval feel of the walls".

== See also ==
- Grade II listed buildings in Chester (central)
