= Morgan's Mount =

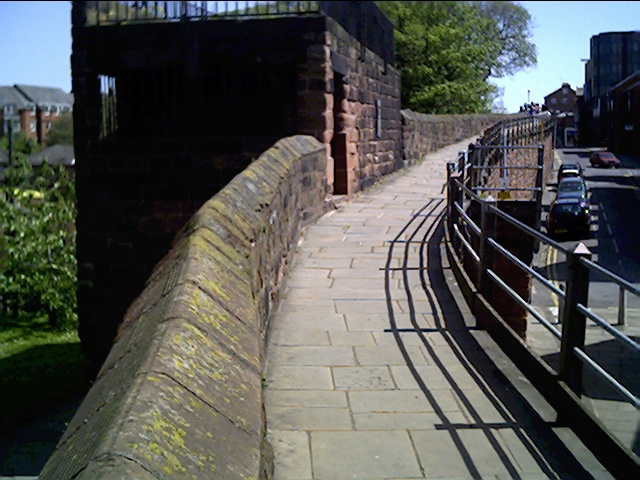
- Chester city walls and Morgan's Mount

- Location in Cheshire
- 53.19328°N 2.89588°W
- Location: Chester, Cheshire, England
- OS grid reference: SJ 402 666

History
- Built: 1645

Listed Building – Grade I
- Designated: 28 July 1955
- Reference no.: 1376134

Morgan's Mount is a structure extending from the north side of the city walls of Chester, in Cheshire, England. It is recorded in the National Heritage List for England as a designated Grade I listed building.

== History ==
It was constructed in 1645 during the siege of Chester in the Civil War as an observation platform and gun emplacement. After the Battle of Rowton Heath in September of that year, a gun on the Mount was destroyed by Parliamentary forces. It was originally named the Raised Square Platform, and is said to have been named later after the Royalist Captain William Morgan, or his son, Edward.

Map of central Chester, showing the line of the city walls and the gates, towers and wall sections of the medieval and post-medieval city.
[Hide/Show the list of Gates, Towers and Wall sections]
1 Bonewaldesthorne's Tower
2 Spur Wall and Water Tower
3 Wall between Bonewaldesthorne's Tower and Pemberton's Parlour
4 Pemberton's Parlour
5 Wall between Pemberton's Parlour and St Martin's Gate
6 St Martin's Gate
7 Wall between St Martin's Gate and Morgan's Mount
8 Morgan's Mount
9 Wall between Morgan's Mount and Northgate
10 Northgate
11 Wall between Northgate and Phoenix Tower
12 Phoenix Tower
13 Wall between Phoenix Tower and Kaleyard Gate
14 Kaleyard Gate
15 Wall between Kaleyard Gate and Eastgate
16 Eastgate
17 Wall between Eastgate and Thimbleby's Tower
18 Thimbleby's Tower
19 Wall between Thimbleby's Tower and Old Newgate
20 Old Newgate
21 Newgate
22 Wall between Newgate and Barnaby's Tower
23 Barnaby's Tower
24 Wall between Barnaby's Tower and the Drum Tower
25 Recorder's Steps
26 Drum Tower
27 Wall between the Drum Tower and Bridgegate
28 Bridgegate
29 Wall between Bridgegate and the former County Hall
30 Wall between former County Hall and Grosvenor Road
31 Wall between Grosvenor Road and Watergate
32 Watergate
33 Wall between Watergate and Bonewaldesthorne's Tower

== Architecture ==
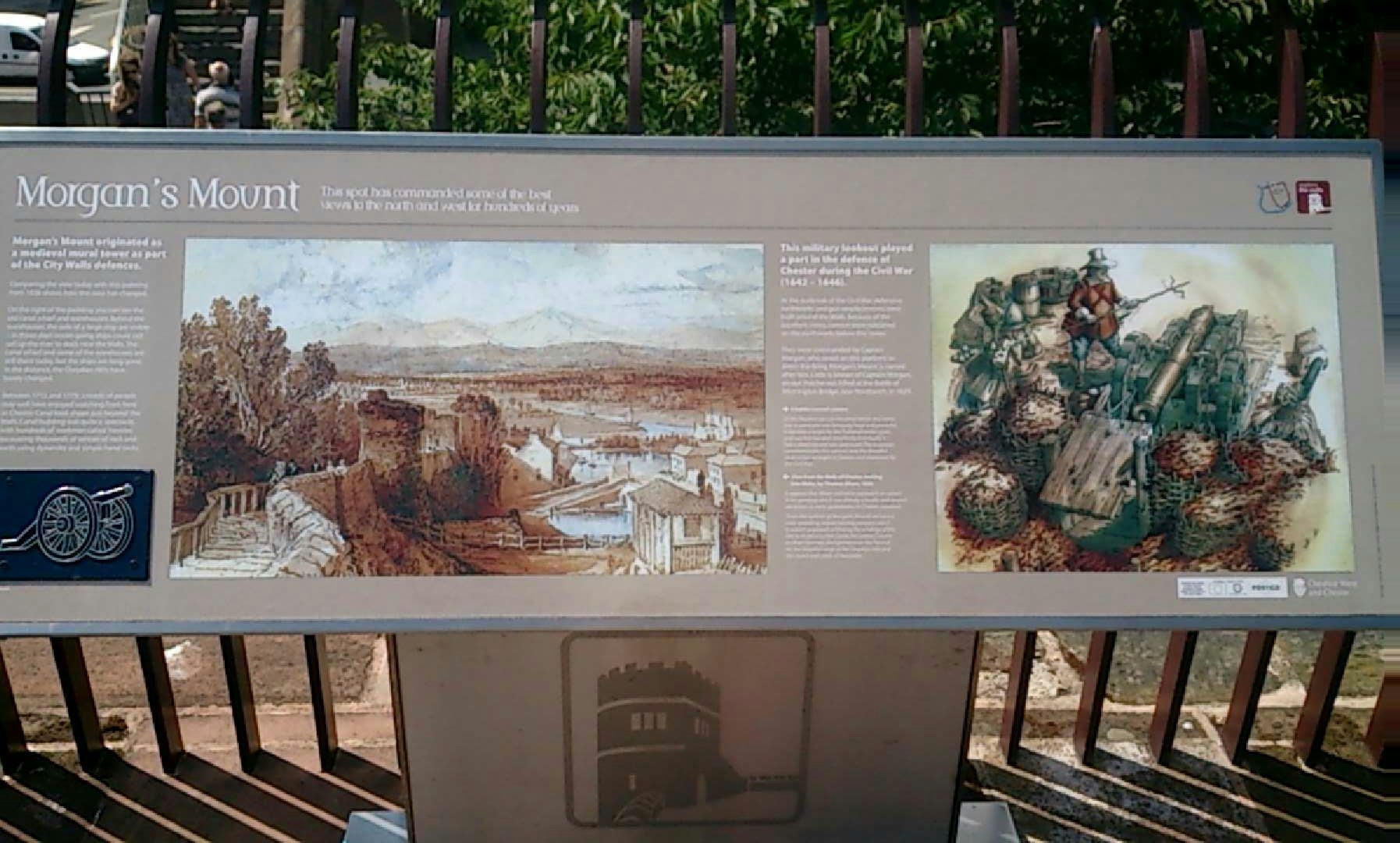
Information board of Morgan's Mount

The Mount is constructed in red sandstone coursed rubble, and is rectangular in shape. It contains a chamber at the level of the walkway, with barred openings to the west and the north. Two flights of five steps lead up to the roof, which has a stone parapet surmounted by an iron railing. One of the steps has a reused Victorian gravestone. At the northeast corner of the roof is an L-shaped stone bench. Providing good views of the welsh hills beyond.

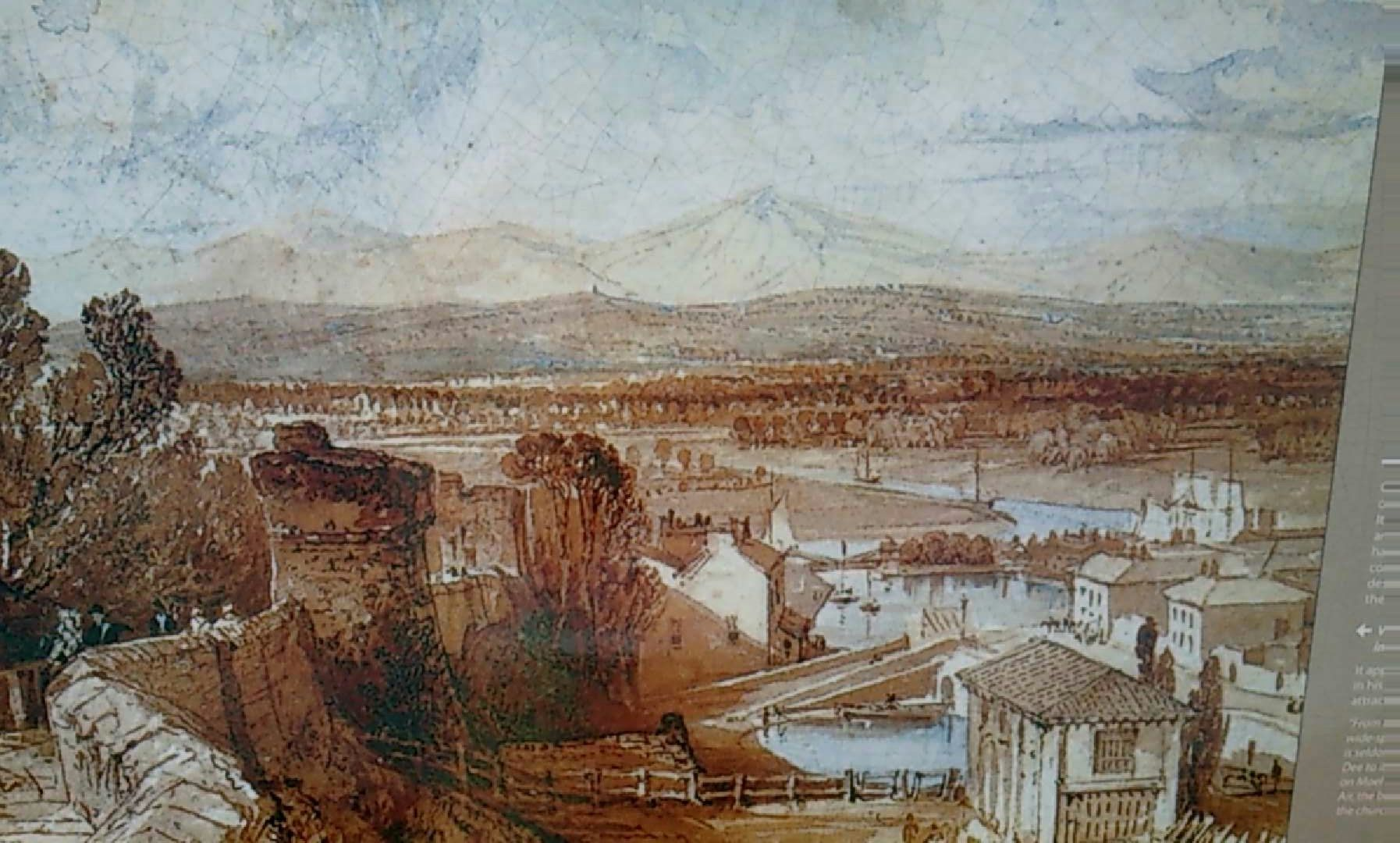
A painting of what Morgan's view was like

== Sculpture ==
At the base of the tower is a life size sculpture representing the civil war cannon destroyed.

== See also ==
- Grade I listed buildings in Cheshire West and Chester
