= Recorder's Steps =

Stone steps in Chester, Cheshire, England

Coordinates: 53.18733°N 2.88746°W

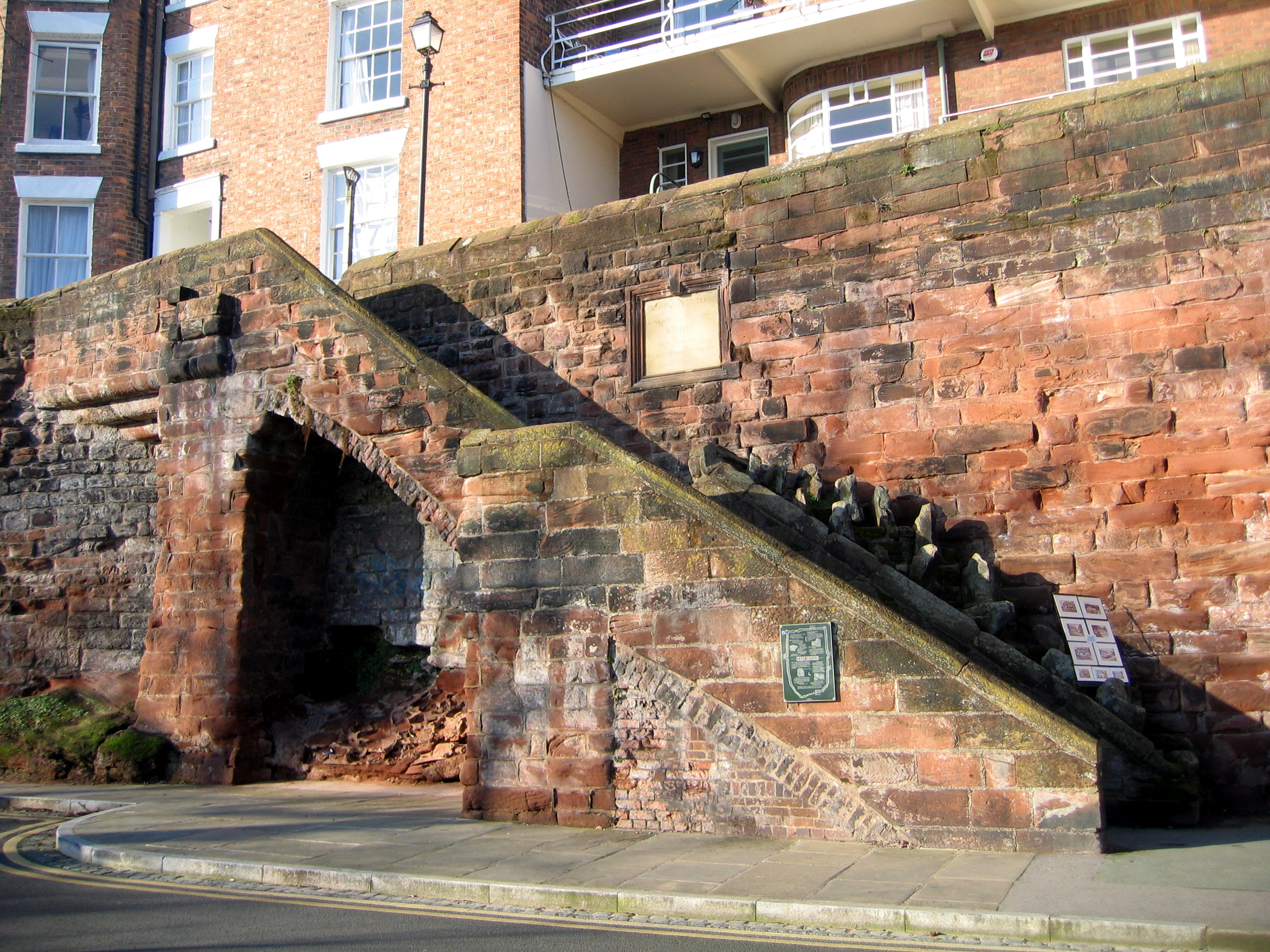
Recorder's Steps

Map of central Chester, showing the line of the city walls and the gates, towers and wall sections of the medieval and post-medieval city.

[Hide/Show the list of Gates, Towers and Wall sections]
1 Bonewaldesthorne's Tower
2 Spur Wall and Water Tower
3 Wall between Bonewaldesthorne's Tower and Pemberton's Parlour
4 Pemberton's Parlour
5 Wall between Pemberton's Parlour and St Martin's Gate
6 St Martin's Gate
7 Wall between St Martin's Gate and Morgan's Mount
8 Morgan's Mount
9 Wall between Morgan's Mount and Northgate
10 Northgate
11 Wall between Northgate and Phoenix Tower
12 Phoenix Tower
13 Wall between Phoenix Tower and Kaleyard Gate
14 Kaleyard Gate
15 Wall between Kaleyard Gate and Eastgate
16 Eastgate
17 Wall between Eastgate and Thimbleby's Tower
18 Thimbleby's Tower
19 Wall between Thimbleby's Tower and Old Newgate
20 Old Newgate
21 Newgate
22 Wall between Newgate and Barnaby's Tower
23 Barnaby's Tower
24 Wall between Barnaby's Tower and the Drum Tower
25 Recorder's Steps
26 Drum Tower
27 Wall between the Drum Tower and Bridgegate
28 Bridgegate
29 Wall between Bridgegate and the former County Hall
30 Wall between former County Hall and Grosvenor Road
31 Wall between Grosvenor Road and Watergate
32 Watergate
33 Wall between Watergate and Bonewaldesthorne's Tower

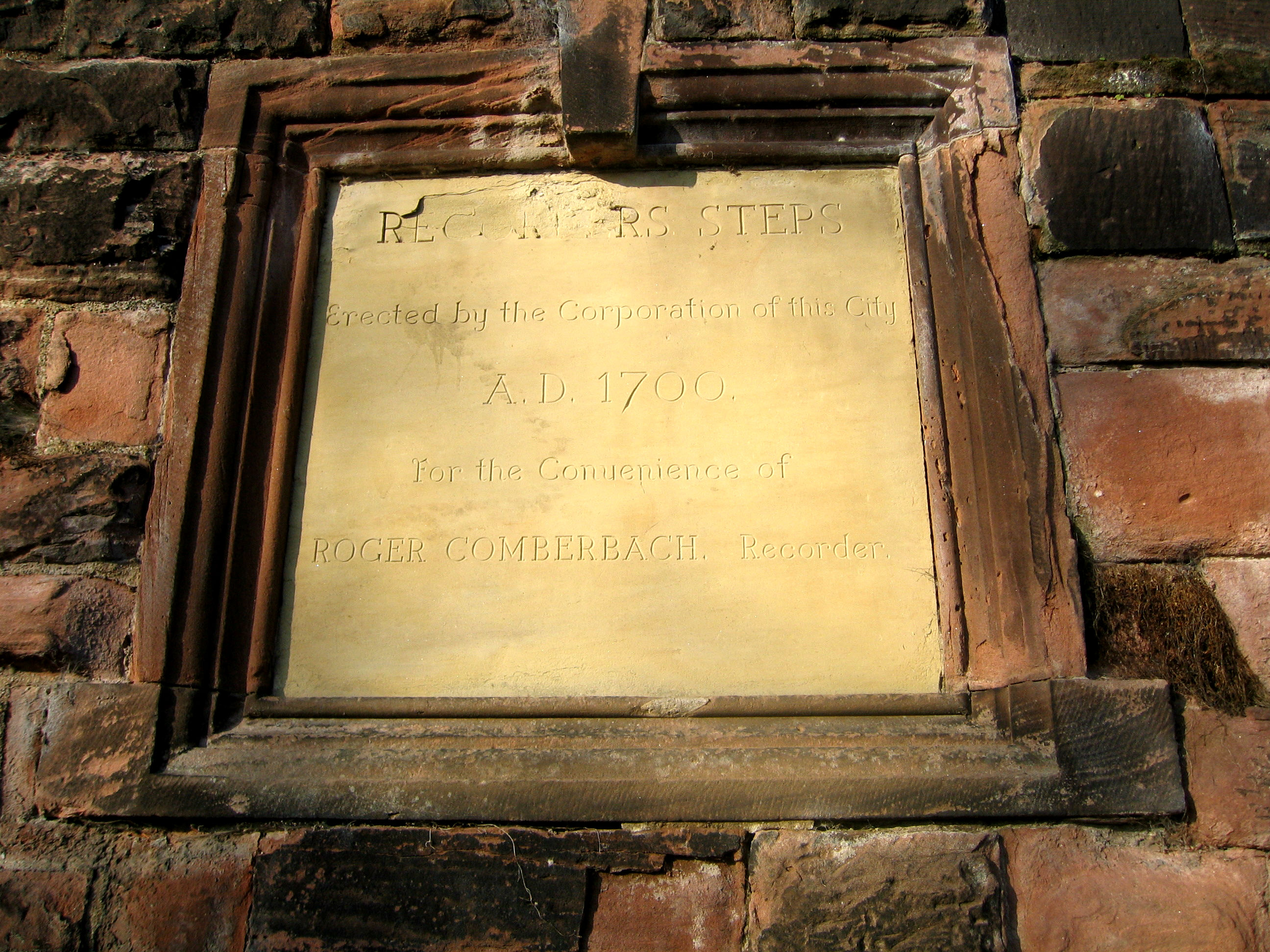
Plaque on the Recorder's Steps

The Recorder's Steps consist of two flights of stone steps leading down from the outside of the city walls in Chester, Cheshire, England. They lead from the walkway at the top of the walls to a riverside area known as the Groves, and are recorded in the National Heritage List for England as a designated Grade I listed building.

The steps are in two flights, of 12 and 15 steps respectively. They were constructed between 1820 and 1822 for Chester Corporation. On the wall by the steps is a plaque, probably inserted in 1881. This contains erroneous information, being inscribed "RECORDER'S STEPS Erected by the Corporation of this City A.D.1700 for the Convenience of ROGER COMBERBACH, Recorder".

== See also ==
- Grade I listed buildings in Cheshire West and Chester
