= Leche House =

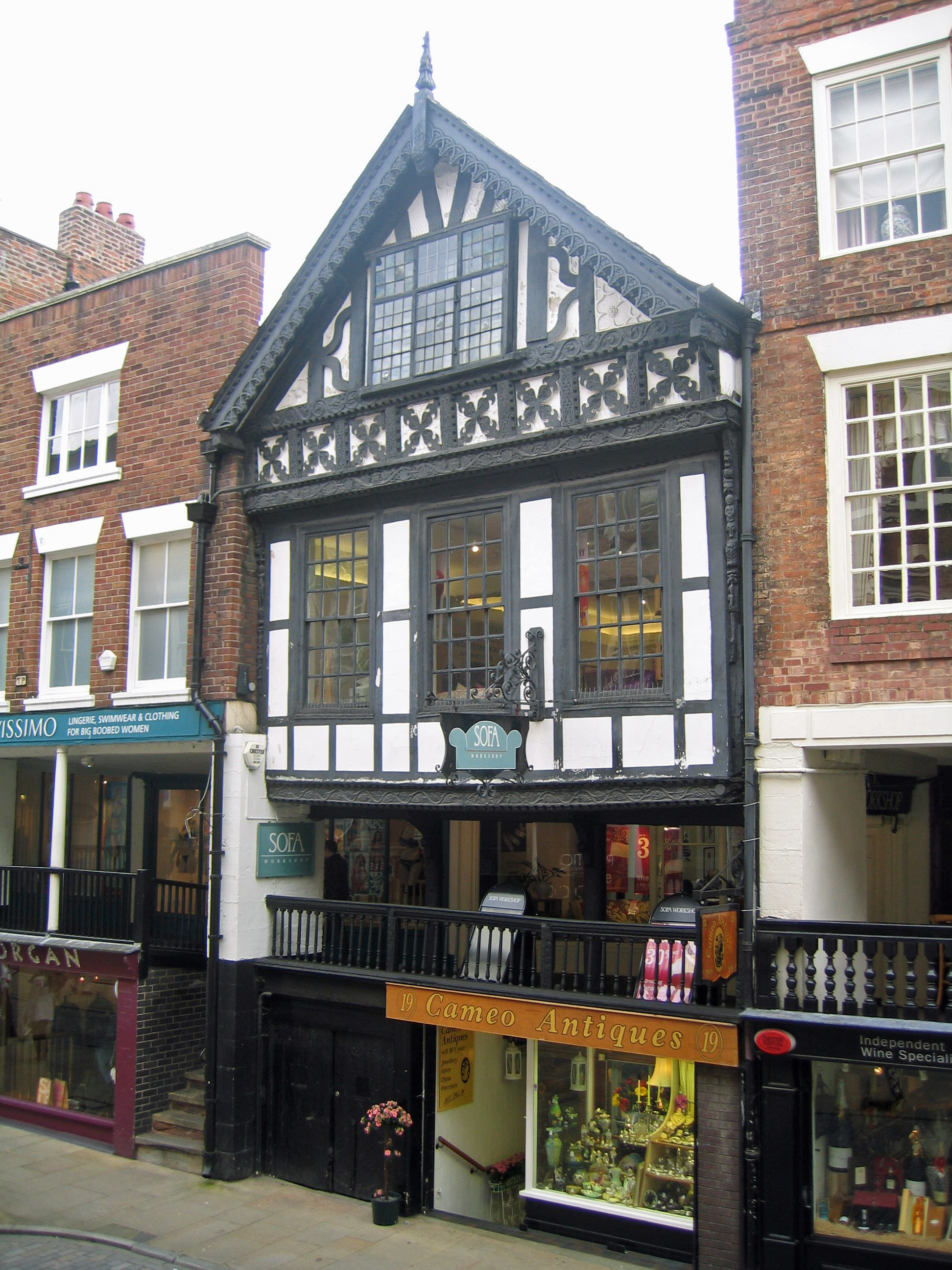
- Leche House

- Location in Cheshire
- 53.1901°N 2.8926°W
- Location: 17 Watergate Street and Row, Chester, Cheshire, England
- OS grid reference: SJ 404 662

History
- Built: 14th century 17th century
- Built for: Sir John Leche

Listed Building – Grade I
- Official name: No.17 Street and No.21 Row (Leche House)
- Designated: 28 July 1955
- Reference no.: 1376427

Leche House is at 17 Watergate Street and Row, Chester, Cheshire, England. It is recorded in the National Heritage List for England as a designated Grade I listed building, and incorporates a section of the Chester Rows. It is considered to be the best preserved medieval town house in Chester.

== History ==
The house was built by Alderman John Leche in the 17th century on an undercroft dating from the late 14th century, which was extended in the later part of the following century; minor alterations were made in the 18th century.

== Architecture ==
=== Exterior ===
The house is built in sandstone and brick at the street level and in timber framing with plaster panels above. The roof is in grey slate. It has three storeys plus an attic in the gable overlooking the street. At the street level is a modern shop front with a double boarded door to the left. On the Row level is a rail on wooden balusters. Behind the walkway is another modern shop front. The third storey has three sash windows on which the date 1736 has been scratched on the glass. These are the Georgian style windows which were inserted in the 18th century. Below and to the sides of the windows are panels. Above these windows is a row of eight panels containing shaped saltire braces. Over this is a mullioned and transomed window to the sides of which are panels with shaped braces; in some of these is pargeting. The bargeboard contains ornate carving and at its top is a finial.

=== Interior ===
The former undercroft at street level has ashlar sandstone walls. At the Row level is a two-storey hall with a gallery along its west side and a plaster strapwork frieze. In the hall is a large fireplace with an overmantel dating from the early 17th century. It has three panels divided by four Ionic pilasters, above which are the arms of Sir John Leche.

== See also ==
- Grade I listed buildings in Cheshire West and Chester
