= Phoenix Tower, Chester =

- Newton Tower, King Charles' Tower
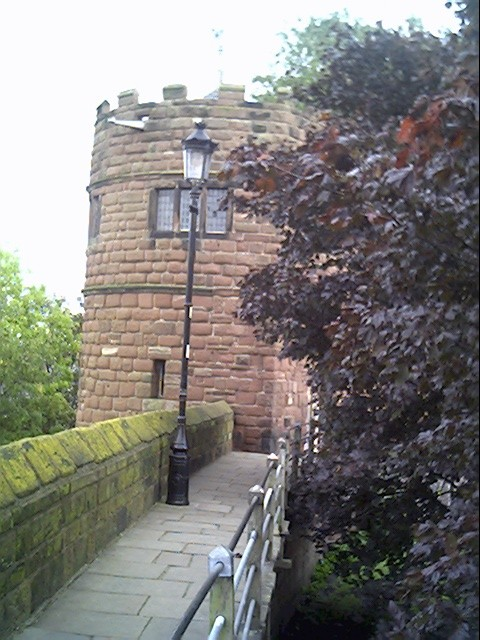
- Phoenix Tower

- Location in Cheshire
- 53.19416°N 2.89041°W
- Location: Chester, England
- OS grid reference: SJ 406 667

History
- Built: 13th century (?)

Listed Building – Grade I
- Designated: 28 July 1955
- Reference no.: 1376157

Phoenix Tower stands at the northeast corner of the city walls in Chester, England. The tower is recorded in the National Heritage List for England as a designated Grade I listed building. It has also been known as Newton Tower and King Charles' Tower.

== History ==
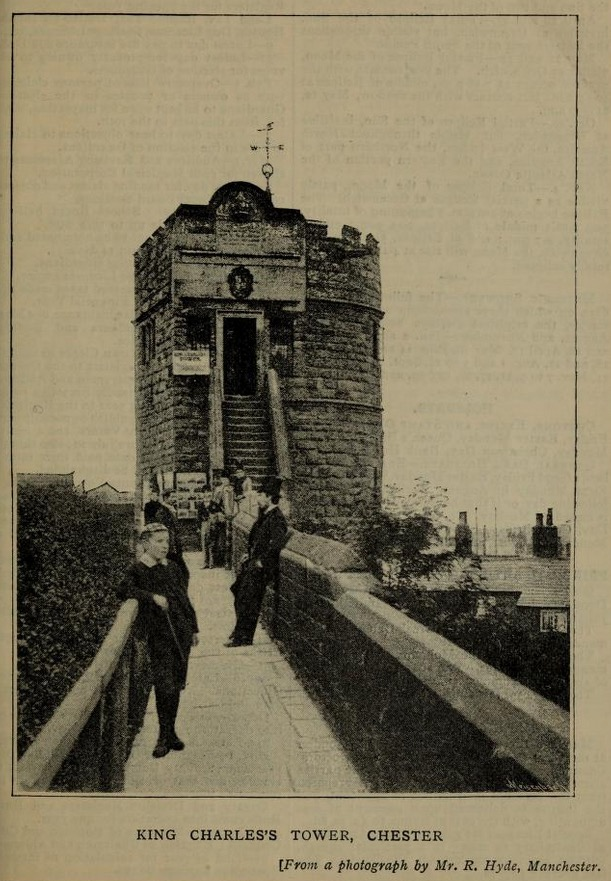
Photograph when it was called King Charles' Tower, 1892

The structure probably originated in the 13th century. During the later part of the 16th century the tower was leased to two city guilds, the Painters and Stationers, and the Barbers and Chandlers, who sublet it to other guilds. By 1612 the fabric of the tower was in a poor condition, and the lead had been lost from its roof. It was restored by the two guilds, and above the door they placed a plaque containing the date 1613 and a carving of a phoenix, the emblem of the Painters. In the Civil War, during the Siege of Chester in 1645, the tower had a gun in each storey, and it was damaged in the conflict. A plaque on the tower states that King Charles I stood on the tower on 24 September 1645 as he watched his soldiers being defeated at the Battle of Rowton Heath. The historian Simon Ward has expressed doubts about this and has suggested that the king may have stood instead on a tower of Chester Cathedral, which he considers is confirmed by evidence that a captain standing beside him was killed by a stray shot.

The guilds resumed possession of the tower in 1658, and repaired it. They ceased possession by about 1773, after which the city carried out repairs. However, by 1838, the tower was described as being in a dilapidated condition. By this time, the city was promoting it as a tourist attraction because of its reputed connection with King Charles. In the late 1850s, the lower chamber was being used by a print-seller, and later in the century the tower was made a private museum.

== Architecture ==
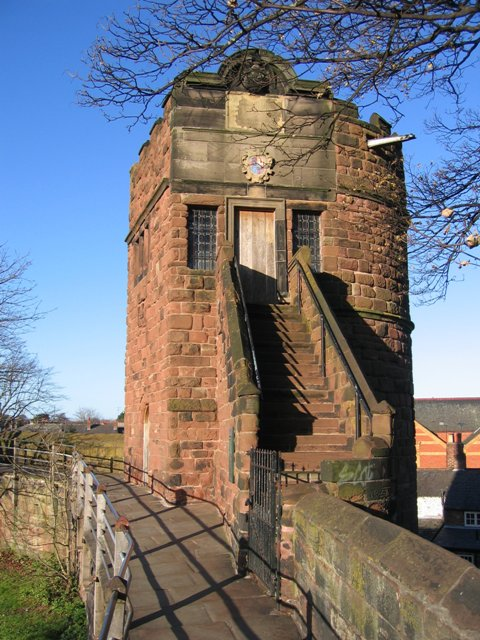
Phoenix Tower on Chester city walls, where Charles is said to have watched his army lose.

The tower is constructed in red coursed sandstone, with a pyramidal slate roof. It stands about 70 feet (21 m) high and is semicircular in plan. The tower is in four stages, the lower two of which are below the walkway on the wall. Each of the upper stages contains a chamber. At the level of the walkway, in the third stage, is a round-headed doorway. Above the doorway is a plaque dated 1613 containing the carved image of a phoenix. An external stairway leads to the upper storey. Internally, the lower chamber is octagonal in plan, with a diameter of about 30 feet (9 m), and it contains five slit windows. Externally, between the upper two stages, is a string course. In the upper stage is a doorway and four three-light leaded casement windows. The top of the tower has a battlemented parapet, lead hip roofs and an ornate weathervane.

Map of central Chester, showing the line of the city walls and the gates, towers and wall sections of the medieval and post-medieval city.
[Hide/Show the list of Gates, Towers and Wall sections]
1 Bonewaldesthorne's Tower
2 Spur Wall and Water Tower
3 Wall between Bonewaldesthorne's Tower and Pemberton's Parlour
4 Pemberton's Parlour
5 Wall between Pemberton's Parlour and St Martin's Gate
6 St Martin's Gate
7 Wall between St Martin's Gate and Morgan's Mount
8 Morgan's Mount
9 Wall between Morgan's Mount and Northgate
10 Northgate
11 Wall between Northgate and Phoenix Tower
12 Phoenix Tower
13 Wall between Phoenix Tower and Kaleyard Gate
14 Kaleyard Gate
15 Wall between Kaleyard Gate and Eastgate
16 Eastgate
17 Wall between Eastgate and Thimbleby's Tower
18 Thimbleby's Tower
19 Wall between Thimbleby's Tower and Old Newgate
20 Old Newgate
21 Newgate
22 Wall between Newgate and Barnaby's Tower
23 Barnaby's Tower
24 Wall between Barnaby's Tower and the Drum Tower
25 Recorder's Steps
26 Drum Tower
27 Wall between the Drum Tower and Bridgegate
28 Bridgegate
29 Wall between Bridgegate and the former County Hall
30 Wall between former County Hall and Grosvenor Road
31 Wall between Grosvenor Road and Watergate
32 Watergate
33 Wall between Watergate and Bonewaldesthorne's Tower

== See also ==
- List of sections of Chester city walls and associated structures
- Grade I listed buildings in Cheshire West and Chester
