= Kaleyard Gate =

Postern gate in Chester, England

Coordinates: 53.1926°N 2.8897°W

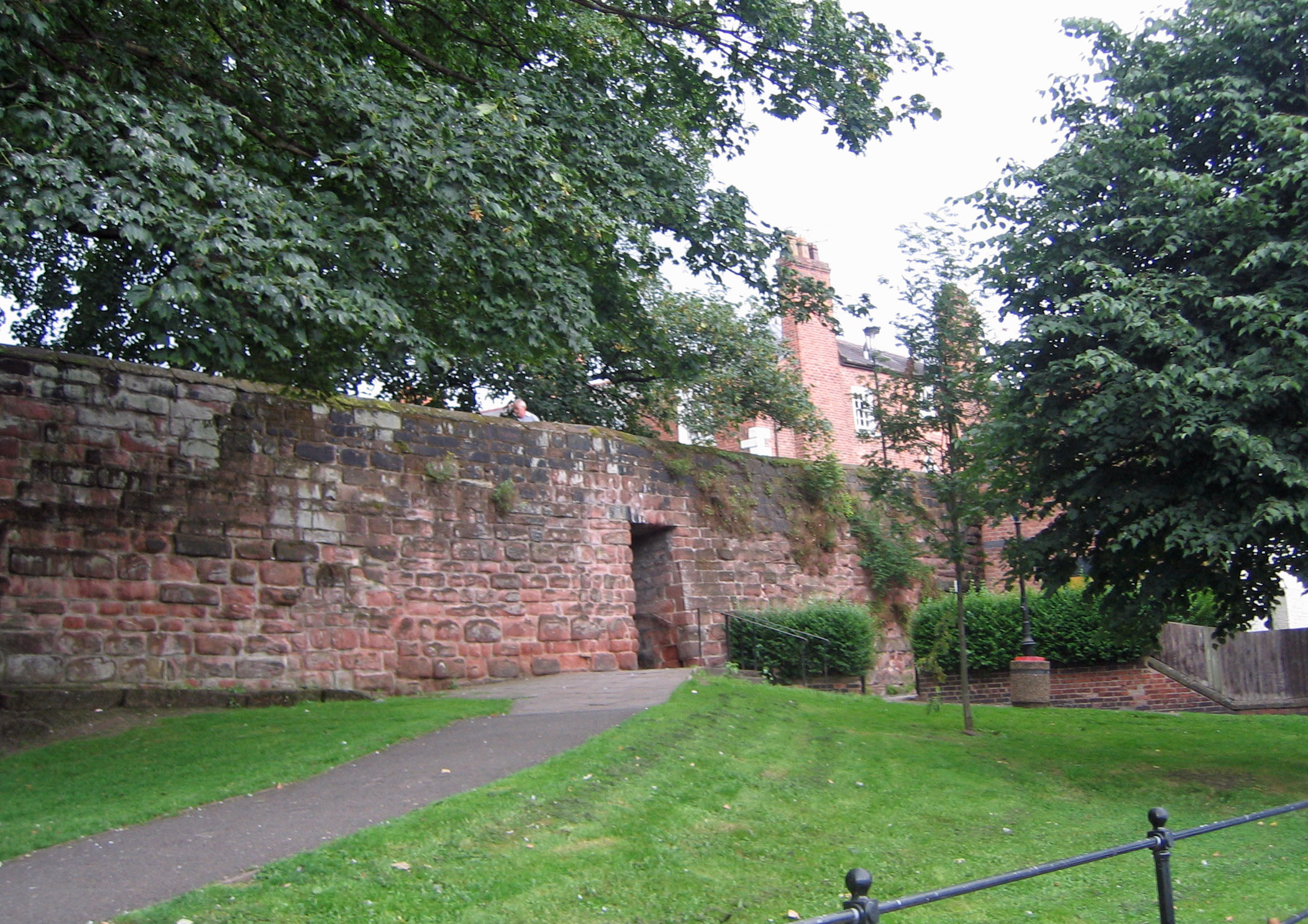
Chester city walls showing Kaleyard Gate

Kaleyard Gate is a postern gate in Chester city walls, Cheshire, England (grid reference SJ406665). It is recorded in the National Heritage List for England as a designated Grade I listed building.

In the 13th century the monks of St Werburgh's Abbey had developed a vegetable garden (known as the kaleyard) outside the city walls. They wanted an easier route to access the kaleyard than the longer walk through Eastgate so they petitioned Edward I in 1275 to allow them to cut a gate through the wall to provide direct access to the garden. This he allowed under certain conditions, one of which was that it must be locked at nightfall.

The gate consists of a simple opening in the sandstone wall containing a door. It is on the east-side wall of the city, numbered 14 on the map below.

Map of central Chester, showing the line of the city walls and the gates, towers and wall sections of the medieval and post-medieval city.

[Hide/Show the list of Gates, Towers and Wall sections]
1 Bonewaldesthorne's Tower
2 Spur Wall and Water Tower
3 Wall between Bonewaldesthorne's Tower and Pemberton's Parlour
4 Pemberton's Parlour
5 Wall between Pemberton's Parlour and St Martin's Gate
6 St Martin's Gate
7 Wall between St Martin's Gate and Morgan's Mount
8 Morgan's Mount
9 Wall between Morgan's Mount and Northgate
10 Northgate
11 Wall between Northgate and Phoenix Tower
12 Phoenix Tower
13 Wall between Phoenix Tower and Kaleyard Gate
14 Kaleyard Gate
15 Wall between Kaleyard Gate and Eastgate
16 Eastgate
17 Wall between Eastgate and Thimbleby's Tower
18 Thimbleby's Tower
19 Wall between Thimbleby's Tower and Old Newgate
20 Old Newgate
21 Newgate
22 Wall between Newgate and Barnaby's Tower
23 Barnaby's Tower
24 Wall between Barnaby's Tower and the Drum Tower
25 Recorder's Steps
26 Drum Tower
27 Wall between the Drum Tower and Bridgegate
28 Bridgegate
29 Wall between Bridgegate and the former County Hall
30 Wall between former County Hall and Grosvenor Road
31 Wall between Grosvenor Road and Watergate
32 Watergate
33 Wall between Watergate and Bonewaldesthorne's Tower

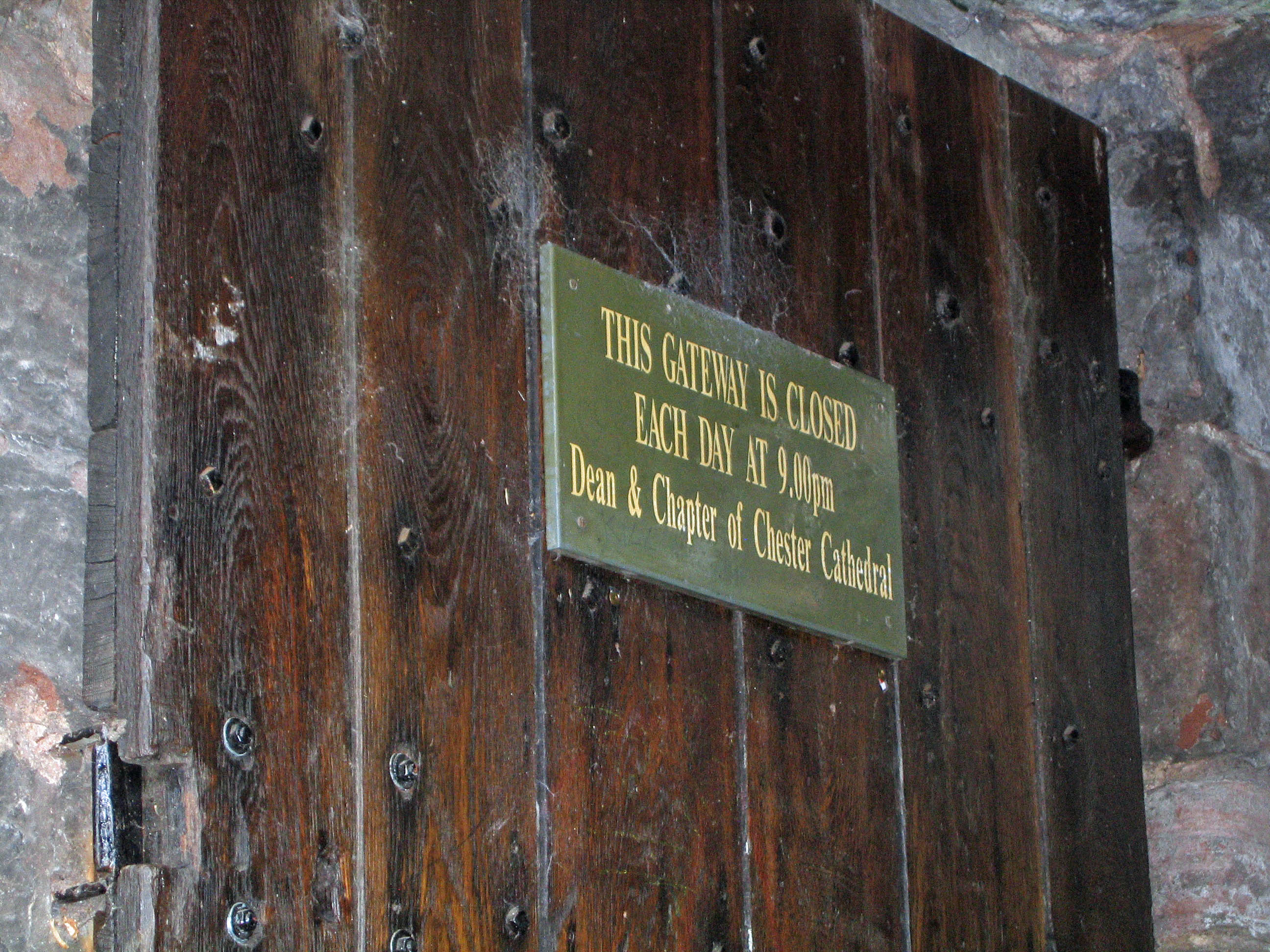
Door in Kaleyard Gate showing the notice about closing the gate

== See also ==
- Grade I listed buildings in Cheshire West and Chester
