= Thimbleby's Tower =

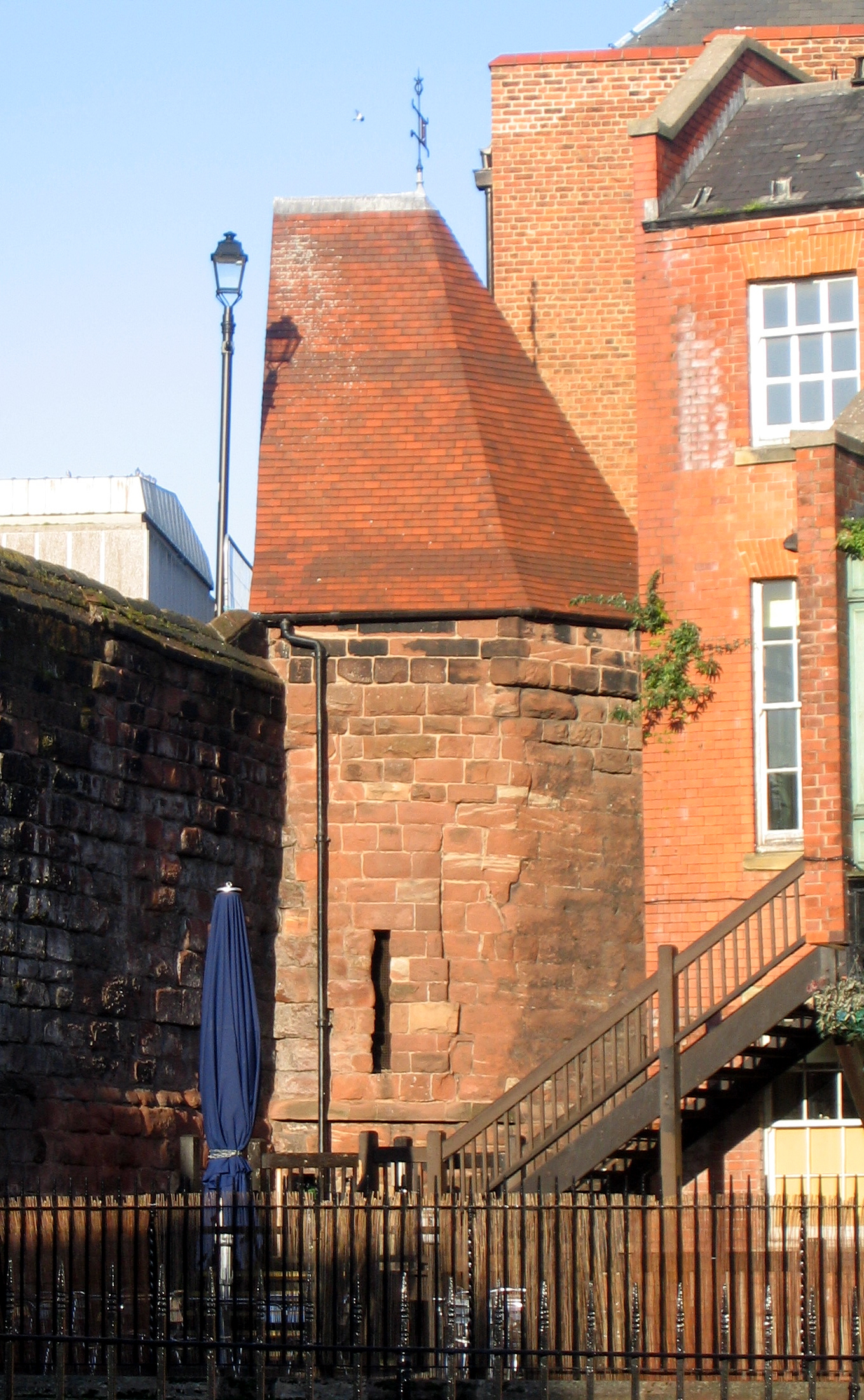
- Thimbleby's Tower

- Location in cheshire
- 53.18940°N 2.88816°W
- OS grid reference: SJ 408 662

History
- Built: 13th century (probable)

Listed Building – Grade I
- Designated: 28 July 1955
- Reference no.: 1376164

Thimbleby's Tower, formerly known as Wolf's Tower, is a structure in the city walls of Chester, Cheshire, England. It stands on the eastern section of the walls, between Eastgate and Newgate. The tower is recorded in the National Heritage List for England as a designated Grade I listed building.

== History ==
The tower probably dates originally from the 13th century. It was partly demolished in the siege of Chester in 1644–46 during the Civil War. Between 1702 and 1708 the whole of the city walls was converted into a raised walkway and it is likely that the tower was modified as part of this process. Repairs were carried out to it in 1879. It was further altered in 1994–95 for Chester City Council by Peter de Figuerdo.

== Architecture ==
Thimbleby's Tower is constructed in coursed red sandstone rubble. Its plan is semi-octagonal, and it appears to be the outer part of a drum tower without its upper storeys. The lower chamber contains three loops (unglazed slit windows), and at the level of the walkway are the springers of a former vault. During the 1994–95 alterations, the stone parapet between the walkway and the tower was replaced by an oak-framed polycarbonate screen. A steeply pitched gabled roof, hung with tiles, was added to the top of the structure. The citation in the National Heritage List for England states that this "masks its former defensive features and purpose".

Map of central Chester, showing the line of the city walls and the gates, towers and wall sections of the medieval and post-medieval city.
[Hide/Show the list of Gates, Towers and Wall sections]
1 Bonewaldesthorne's Tower
2 Spur Wall and Water Tower
3 Wall between Bonewaldesthorne's Tower and Pemberton's Parlour
4 Pemberton's Parlour
5 Wall between Pemberton's Parlour and St Martin's Gate
6 St Martin's Gate
7 Wall between St Martin's Gate and Morgan's Mount
8 Morgan's Mount
9 Wall between Morgan's Mount and Northgate
10 Northgate
11 Wall between Northgate and Phoenix Tower
12 Phoenix Tower
13 Wall between Phoenix Tower and Kaleyard Gate
14 Kaleyard Gate
15 Wall between Kaleyard Gate and Eastgate
16 Eastgate
17 Wall between Eastgate and Thimbleby's Tower
18 Thimbleby's Tower
19 Wall between Thimbleby's Tower and Old Newgate
20 Old Newgate
21 Newgate
22 Wall between Newgate and Barnaby's Tower
23 Barnaby's Tower
24 Wall between Barnaby's Tower and the Drum Tower
25 Recorder's Steps
26 Drum Tower
27 Wall between the Drum Tower and Bridgegate
28 Bridgegate
29 Wall between Bridgegate and the former County Hall
30 Wall between former County Hall and Grosvenor Road
31 Wall between Grosvenor Road and Watergate
32 Watergate
33 Wall between Watergate and Bonewaldesthorne's Tower

== See also ==
- Grade I listed buildings in Cheshire West and Chester
