= Cowper House =

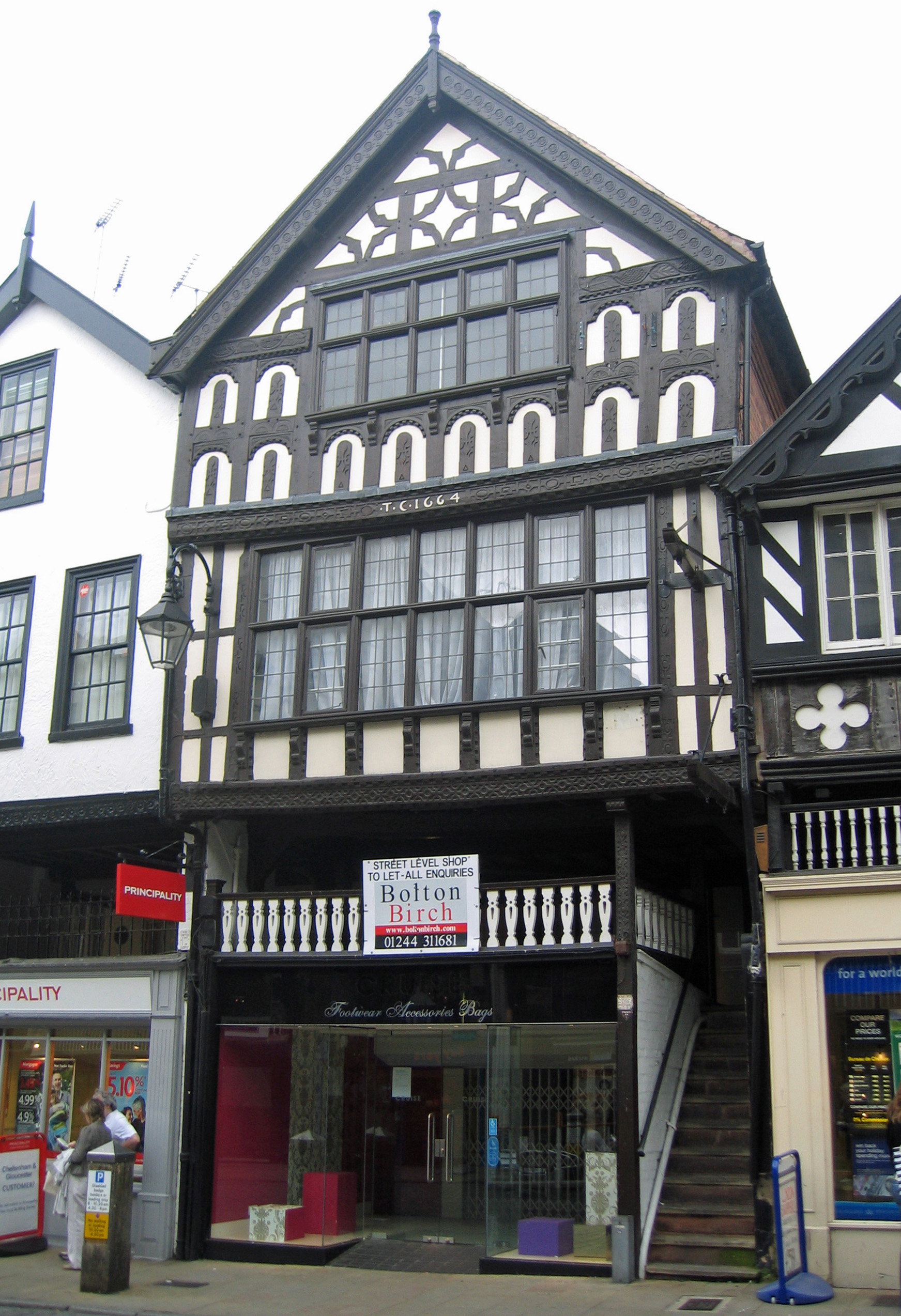
- Cowper House

- Location in Cheshire
- 53.1899°N 2.8917°W
- Location: 12 Bridge Street, Chester, Cheshire, England
- OS grid reference: SJ 405 662

History
- Built: 1664
- Built for: Thomas Cowper

Listed Building – Grade I
- Official name: No.12 Street and No.10 Row (Cowper House)
- Designated: 28 July 1955

Cowper House is a former town house at 12 Bridge Street, Chester, Cheshire, England. It is recorded in the National Heritage List for England as a designated Grade I listed building, and it incorporates a section of the Chester Rows.

== History ==
Cowper House was built in 1664, following the destruction of many buildings in Chester during the Civil War. It was built above undercrofts dating from 1350 to 1375, or possibly earlier. Alterations have been made to the building in the 19th and 20th centuries. Thomas Cowper had been mayor of Chester in 1641–42 and a Royalist supporter in the Civil War. The rear undercroft was excavated in 1839, and it is thought that the front undercroft is older than that in the rear.

== Architecture ==
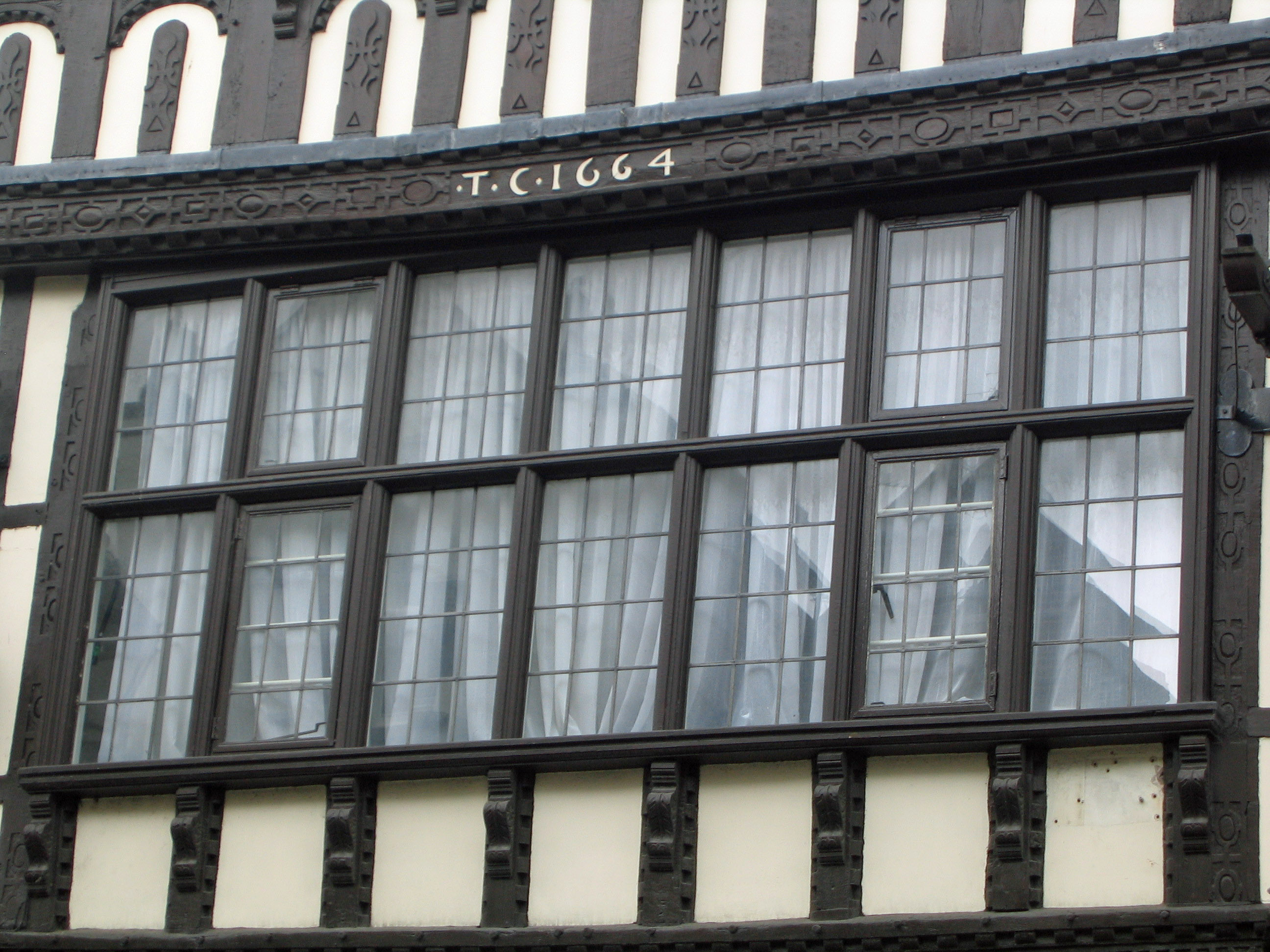
Detail of Cowper House showing the inscription

=== Exterior ===
The house is constructed in sandstone, brick, and timber framing with plaster panels. The roof is of grey slate. It has four storeys and a gable overlooking the street. The street level consists of a modern shop front on the right of which is a flight of 11 stone steps leading to the Row level above. At the Row level is another modern shop front. Between this and the street is a walkway, a sloping stallboard and a rail with balusters overlooking the street. Above the Row opening is a carved fascia. In the storey above is a window running almost the whole width of the building. Its frame projects from the wall and is carried on eight corbels. The window has 14 lights, is mullioned and transomed, and contains leaded lights. Below and on each side of the window are timber-framed panels. The top storey is jettied. At its base is a bressummer carved centrally with "•T•C•1664" (the initials are those of Thomas Cowper), on each side of which are carved patterns. The top storey has a ten-light mullioned and transomed casement window containing leaded lights. Below the window are eight panels containing wooden carvings, and two similar panels are on each side of the window. Above the window are quadrant-braced panels. The bargeboard is decorated with carvings and at its peak is a finial.

=== Interior ===
Two steps lead down from the street to the front undercroft which is 16m long. At its rear, six steps lead down to the rear undercroft which is 13m long. This undercroft has six bays and is rib vaulted. At the far end is a three-light window. On the left side in the fifth bay is a stone stairway. In the third storey is a sandstone fireplace with a beam inscribed "TC 1661" on each side of a blank shield.

== See also ==
- Grade I listed buildings in Cheshire West and Chester
