= Old Crypt, Chester =

Old Crypt
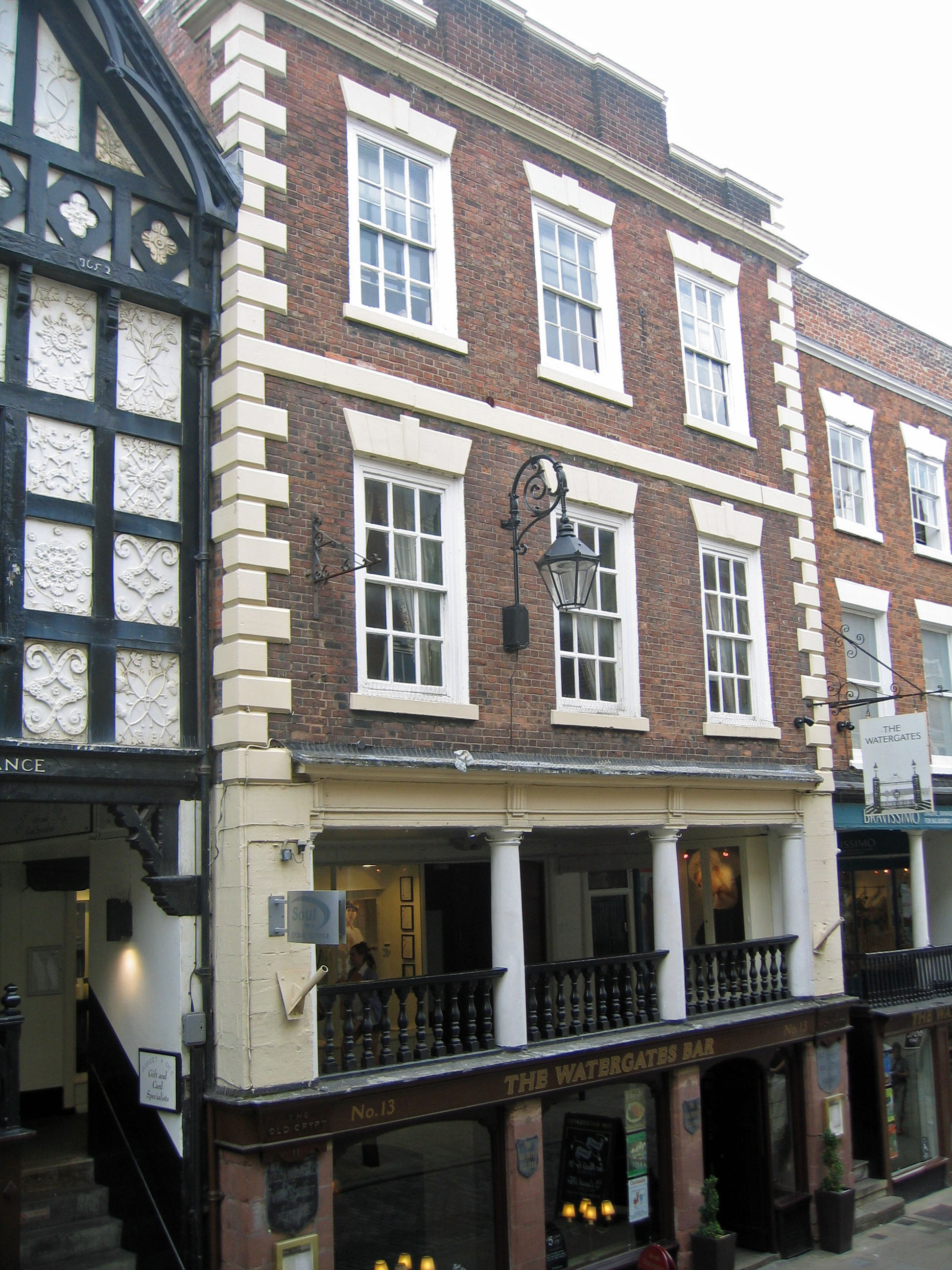
- Old Crypt

- Location in Cheshire
- 53.1901°N 2.8925°W
- Location: 11 Watergate Street and 15/15A Watergate Row, Chester, Cheshire, England
- OS grid reference: SJ 404 662

History
- Built: c. 1300 c.1744

Site notes
- Architectural style: Georgian

Listed Building – Grade I
- Designated: 18 July 1955

The Old Crypt is a building at 11 Watergate Street and 15/15A Watergate Row, Chester, Cheshire, England. It is recorded in the National Heritage List for England as a designated Grade I listed building and incorporates part of Chester Rows.

The Old Crypt is built in sandstone and brick with a grey slate roof. It has five storeys; the lowest two are medieval undercrofts dating from about 1180, and the storey above it includes part of Chester Rows. The top two storeys are in Georgian style and date from about 1744. Externally at street level is a 19th-century shop front with two chamfered piers. Behind this, the undercroft has two naves, each with four bays which are divided by octagonal columns. At the Row level overlooking the street is a wooden rail on a balustrade divided by two Tuscan columns. Behind this is the walkway and a 20th-century shop front. The two top storeys each have three Georgian style 12-pane sash windows. Between the storeys is a stone string course and at the sides of the building are rusticated quoins. At its top is an irregular stepped parapet.

== See also ==
- Grade I listed buildings in Cheshire West and Chester
