= Abbey Gateway, Chester =

Abbey Gateway
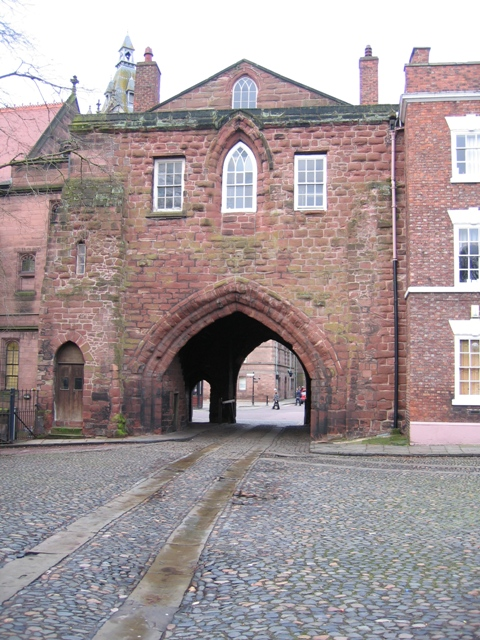
- Gateway from Abbey Square (east face)

- Location in Cheshire
- 53.1921°N 2.8920°W
- Location: Chester, Cheshire, England
- OS grid reference: SJ 405 664

History
- Built: c. 1300
- Rebuilt: c. 1800 (upper storey)

Site notes
- Architect: Richard Lenginour (?)
- Architectural style: Gothic

Listed Building – Grade I
- Designated: 28 July 1955

The Abbey Gateway is in Chester, Cheshire, England, and leads from Northgate Street into Abbey Square. It is recorded in the National Heritage List for England as a designated Grade I listed building.

== History ==
The gateway was built as a gatehouse around 1300 and its upper storey was rebuilt around 1800. It was formerly the main access to the precinct of St Werburgh's Abbey. It is thought that the architect was Richard Lenginour (Richard the Engineer).

== Architecture ==
The gateway is built in red sandstone with gables to the front and rear. The west face has a central arch for vehicles and a smaller arch to the south for pedestrians. On each side of the central arch is a blind niche. In the upper storey is a 16-pane window in a Gothic arch. On the east face is one arch, larger than that on the west face. In the upper storey is a central window in a Gothic arch with a rectangular window on each side. In the gable end is another Gothic-shaped window. To the south of the arch is a diminishing turret containing an arched doorway with a small window above it.

== See also ==
- Grade I listed buildings in Chester
