= Pemberton's Parlour =

Grade I listed building in the United Kingdom

- Goblin Tower
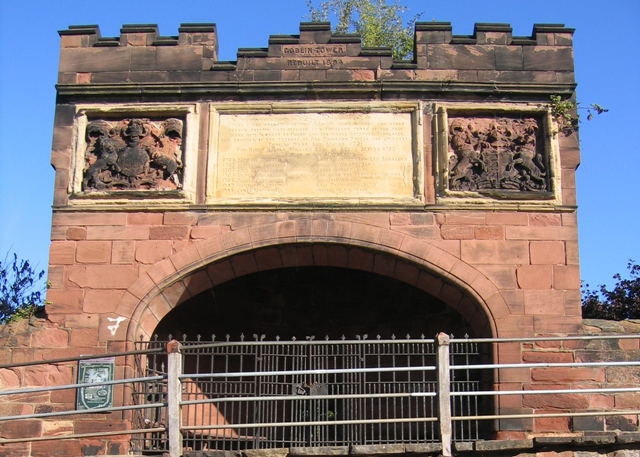
- Pemberton's Parlour

- Location in Cheshire
- 53.19300°N 2.89723°W
- Location: Chester, England
- OS grid reference: SJ 402 666

Listed Building – Grade I
- Designated: 28 July 1955
- Reference no.: 1376131

Pemberton's Parlour is a structure on the northern part of the Chester city walls, and it was formerly known as the Goblin Tower. It is recorded in the National Heritage List for England as a designated Grade I listed building.

== History ==
The structure originated as a circular tower straddling the city walls. During the reign of Queen Anne it was rebuilt as a semicircular tower. It was reconstructed in 1894. It is now described as a gazebo, and is said to be named after John Pemburton, the mayor of Chester, who stood on it to supervise the work taking place on his nearby ropewalk.

Map of central Chester, showing the line of the city walls and the gates, towers and wall sections of the medieval and post-medieval city.
[Hide/Show the list of Gates, Towers and Wall sections]
1 Bonewaldesthorne's Tower
2 Spur Wall and Water Tower
3 Wall between Bonewaldesthorne's Tower and Pemberton's Parlour
4 Pemberton's Parlour
5 Wall between Pemberton's Parlour and St Martin's Gate
6 St Martin's Gate
7 Wall between St Martin's Gate and Morgan's Mount
8 Morgan's Mount
9 Wall between Morgan's Mount and Northgate
10 Northgate
11 Wall between Northgate and Phoenix Tower
12 Phoenix Tower
13 Wall between Phoenix Tower and Kaleyard Gate
14 Kaleyard Gate
15 Wall between Kaleyard Gate and Eastgate
16 Eastgate
17 Wall between Eastgate and Thimbleby's Tower
18 Thimbleby's Tower
19 Wall between Thimbleby's Tower and Old Newgate
20 Old Newgate
21 Newgate
22 Wall between Newgate and Barnaby's Tower
23 Barnaby's Tower
24 Wall between Barnaby's Tower and the Drum Tower
25 Recorder's Steps
26 Drum Tower
27 Wall between the Drum Tower and Bridgegate
28 Bridgegate
29 Wall between Bridgegate and the former County Hall
30 Wall between former County Hall and Grosvenor Road
31 Wall between Grosvenor Road and Watergate
32 Watergate
33 Wall between Watergate and Bonewaldesthorne's Tower

== Architecture ==
The structure is built in red sandstone. On the south side, facing the walkway of the walls, is an arch leading to a semicircular chamber. Above this are three panels, the lateral ones containing the royal arms, and the arms of Chester in relief. Between these is another panel in yellow sandstone with an inscription relating to the repair of the walls in the 18th century. The parapet is crenellated and inscribed with "GOBLIN TOWER: REBUILT 1894".

== See also ==
- Grade I listed buildings in Cheshire West and Chester
