= Water Tower, Chester =

Water Tower
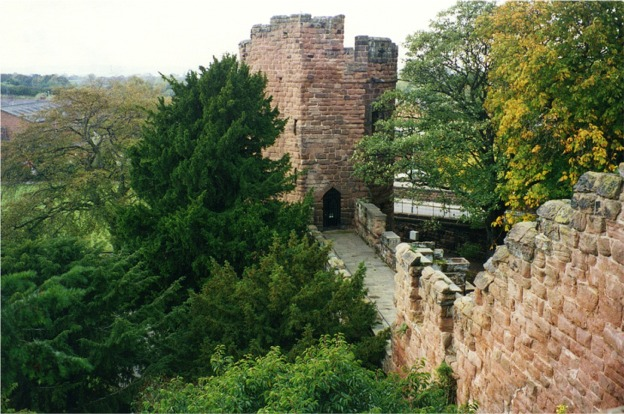
- Spur wall leading to the Water Tower

- Location in Cheshire
- 53.1926°N 2.8995°W
- Location: Chester, Cheshire, England
- OS grid reference: SJ 399 665

History
- Built: 1325

Site notes
- Architect: John Helpston

Listed Building – Grade I
- Official name: Spur wall and Water Tower
- Designated: 28 July 1955
- Reference no.: 1376129

The Water Tower (originally known as the New Tower) is a 14th-century tower in Chester, Cheshire, England, which is attached by a spur wall to Bonewaldesthorne's Tower on the city walls. The tower, together with its spur wall, is recorded in the National Heritage List for England as a designated Grade I listed building. The original name of the tower was New Tower but in the 17th century it became known as the Water Tower, although the City Assembly tried to insist on the usage of its correct name.

== History ==
The tower was built between 1322 and 1325, at which time it stood in the River Dee. It is attached to Bonewaldesthorne's Tower by a spur wall. The architect was John (de) Helpston who had also designed castles for King Edward II in North Wales. Its prime purpose was to defend the port of Chester, and it was also used to monitor the movements of shipping and to ensure that the custom dues were paid. The cost of the tower and the spur wall was £100 (equivalent to £80,000 as of 2025). By the end of the 16th century the river had silted up and the tower was landlocked. In 1639 the tower was renovated at the city's expense and during the following decade embrasures in the spur wall were made into gun ports. During the Civil War the tower was attacked and damaged. From 1671 it was leased as a storehouse but in 1728 it was described as "useless and neglected".

The Chester Mechanics' Institution was founded in 1835. The Institution wished to open a museum to show its artifacts and the city council leased the Water Tower and Bonewaldesthorne's Tower at a nominal rent for this purpose. The museum opened in 1838. The Institution closed in 1876 and the exhibits came into the possession of the city council. Although it was recognised that the tower was not suitable as a museum, there was at the time nowhere else to show all the exhibits. The tower closed as a museum in 1901–02 while the city walls were rebuilt, and re-opened in 1903, attracting 12,000 visitors that season. The towers were closed to the public in 1916 and in the 1920s they were let for non-museum use. In 1954 they were bought by the Grosvenor Museum which reopened them to the public in 1962. The tower is now some 200 yards (183 m) inland from the river, and is probably the least-altered of Chester's medieval towers. The Water Tower and the adjacent Bonewaldesthorne's Tower have housed a museum of the history of medicine, 'Sick to Death', since August 2016.

Map of central Chester, showing the line of the city walls and the gates, towers and wall sections of the medieval and post-medieval city.
[Hide/Show the list of Gates, Towers and Wall sections]
1 Bonewaldesthorne's Tower
2 Spur Wall and Water Tower
3 Wall between Bonewaldesthorne's Tower and Pemberton's Parlour
4 Pemberton's Parlour
5 Wall between Pemberton's Parlour and St Martin's Gate
6 St Martin's Gate
7 Wall between St Martin's Gate and Morgan's Mount
8 Morgan's Mount
9 Wall between Morgan's Mount and Northgate
10 Northgate
11 Wall between Northgate and Phoenix Tower
12 Phoenix Tower
13 Wall between Phoenix Tower and Kaleyard Gate
14 Kaleyard Gate
15 Wall between Kaleyard Gate and Eastgate
16 Eastgate
17 Wall between Eastgate and Thimbleby's Tower
18 Thimbleby's Tower
19 Wall between Thimbleby's Tower and Old Newgate
20 Old Newgate
21 Newgate
22 Wall between Newgate and Barnaby's Tower
23 Barnaby's Tower
24 Wall between Barnaby's Tower and the Drum Tower
25 Recorder's Steps
26 Drum Tower
27 Wall between the Drum Tower and Bridgegate
28 Bridgegate
29 Wall between Bridgegate and the former County Hall
30 Wall between former County Hall and Grosvenor Road
31 Wall between Grosvenor Road and Watergate
32 Watergate
33 Wall between Watergate and Bonewaldesthorne's Tower

== Architecture ==
The tower and spur wall are built in sandstone rubble. The tower is about 75 feet (23 m) high, and the wall is 97 feet (30 m) long, just over 11 feet (3 m) wide and about 24 feet (7 m) high. An archway in the city walls leads to 44 stone steps on the way down to the tower. The wall is crenellated; this may be the only surviving example of medieval crenellation on the city walls. The tower is circular at its base with a square turret above, in two stages containing octagonal chambers, one above the other. A pointed archway leads from the wall into the lower chamber. In the angle between the tower and the wall was a small latrine. Five stone steps lead down from the archway through the wall (about 12 feet (4 m) thick) to the lower chamber. Formerly in its walls were embrasures, but these have been blocked and are only visible from the exterior. A circular staircase of 23 steps leads to the upper chamber, which has four embrasures in its walls. Above this is a raised fighting platform overlooking the entrance to the tower. The top of the tower is crenellated.

== See also ==
- List of sections of Chester city walls and associated structures
- Grade I listed buildings in Cheshire West and Chester
