= Bonewaldesthorne's Tower =

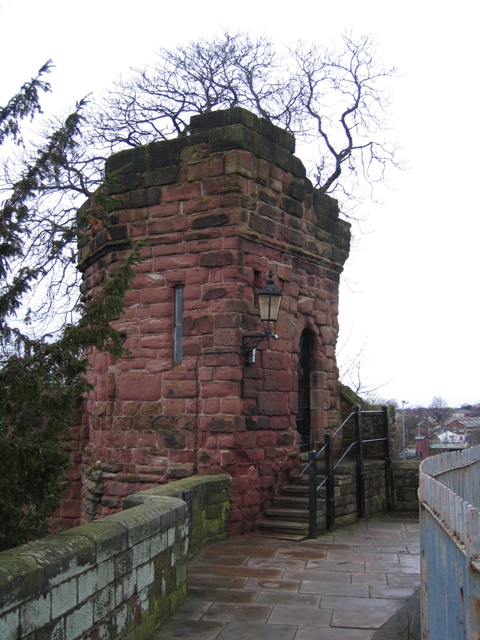
- Bonewaldesthorne's Tower from Chester city walls

- Location in Cheshire
- 53.19267°N 2.89892°W
- Location: Chester, Cheshire, England
- OS grid reference: SJ 400 665

History
- Built: By 1249
- Rebuilt: 1322–26

Listed Building – Grade I
- Official name: Bonewaldesthorne tower
- Designated: 28 July 1955

Bonewaldesthorne's Tower is a medieval structure on the northwest corner of the city walls of Chester, Cheshire, England; it is attached by a spur wall to the Water Tower. It is recorded in the National Heritage List for England as a designated Grade I listed building. Built as part of Chester's defensive system, it was used in the 19th and early 20th centuries as a museum.

== History ==
The tower has been documented since 1249. It was rebuilt or altered in 1322–26 when it became the gatehouse to the Water Tower. The Chester Mechanics' Institution was founded in 1835. The Institution wished to open a museum to show its artifacts and the city council leased the Water Tower and Bonewaldesthorne's Tower at a nominal rent for this purpose. The museum opened in 1838. A camera obscura was installed in the tower in 1840 and an observatory in 1848. Around this time a statue of Queen Anne which had formerly been in the Exchange before it burned down was installed on the steps of the tower.

The Institution closed in 1876 and the exhibits came into the possession of the city council. Although it was recognised that the tower was not suitable as a museum, there was at the time nowhere else to show all the exhibits. The tower closed as a museum in 1901–02 while the city walls were rebuilt, and re-opened in 1903, attracting 12,000 visitors that season. The towers were closed to the public in 1916 and in the 1920s they were let for non-museum use. In 1954 they were bought by the Grosvenor Museum, which reopened them to the public in 1962. Bonewaldesthorne's Tower and the adjacent Water Tower have housed a museum of the history of medicine, 'Sick to Death', since August 2016.

Map of central Chester, showing the line of the city walls and the gates, towers and wall sections of the medieval and post-medieval city.
[Hide/Show the list of Gates, Towers and Wall sections]
1 Bonewaldesthorne's Tower
2 Spur Wall and Water Tower
3 Wall between Bonewaldesthorne's Tower and Pemberton's Parlour
4 Pemberton's Parlour
5 Wall between Pemberton's Parlour and St Martin's Gate
6 St Martin's Gate
7 Wall between St Martin's Gate and Morgan's Mount
8 Morgan's Mount
9 Wall between Morgan's Mount and Northgate
10 Northgate
11 Wall between Northgate and Phoenix Tower
12 Phoenix Tower
13 Wall between Phoenix Tower and Kaleyard Gate
14 Kaleyard Gate
15 Wall between Kaleyard Gate and Eastgate
16 Eastgate
17 Wall between Eastgate and Thimbleby's Tower
18 Thimbleby's Tower
19 Wall between Thimbleby's Tower and Old Newgate
20 Old Newgate
21 Newgate
22 Wall between Newgate and Barnaby's Tower
23 Barnaby's Tower
24 Wall between Barnaby's Tower and the Drum Tower
25 Recorder's Steps
26 Drum Tower
27 Wall between the Drum Tower and Bridgegate
28 Bridgegate
29 Wall between Bridgegate and the former County Hall
30 Wall between former County Hall and Grosvenor Road
31 Wall between Grosvenor Road and Watergate
32 Watergate
33 Wall between Watergate and Bonewaldesthorne's Tower

== Architecture ==
The plan of the tower is rectangular. It is built in red sandstone coursed rubble and stands on a tall plinth. Seven steps lead up from the walkway on the city walls to an arched doorway. On the opposite side another doorway leads on to the spur wall to the Water Tower. The top of the tower is battlemented. Inside the tower is a fireplace and a closed staircase which is lit by a single slit window.

== See also ==
- Grade I listed buildings in Cheshire West and Chester
