= Bear and Billet =

Grade I listed pub in Chester, England

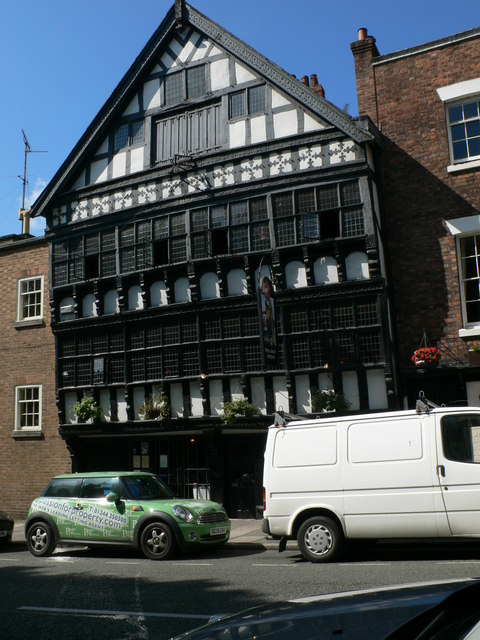
- Bear and Billet

- Location in Cheshire
- 53.1863°N 2.8896°W
- Location: 94 Lower Bridge Street, Chester, Cheshire, England
- OS grid reference: SJ 406 658

History
- Built: 1664
- Built for: Earls of Shrewsbury

Listed Building – Grade I
- Official name: No.94 Bear & Billet Public House
- Designated: 28 July 1955
- Reference no.: 1376318

The Bear and Billet is a public house at 94 Lower Bridge Street, Chester, Cheshire, England. It is recorded in the National Heritage List for England as a designated Grade I listed building. The building has been described as "the finest 17th-century timber-framed town house in Chester" and "one of the last of the great timber-framed town houses in England". It stands on the west side of Lower Bridge Street to the north of the Bridgegate.

== History ==
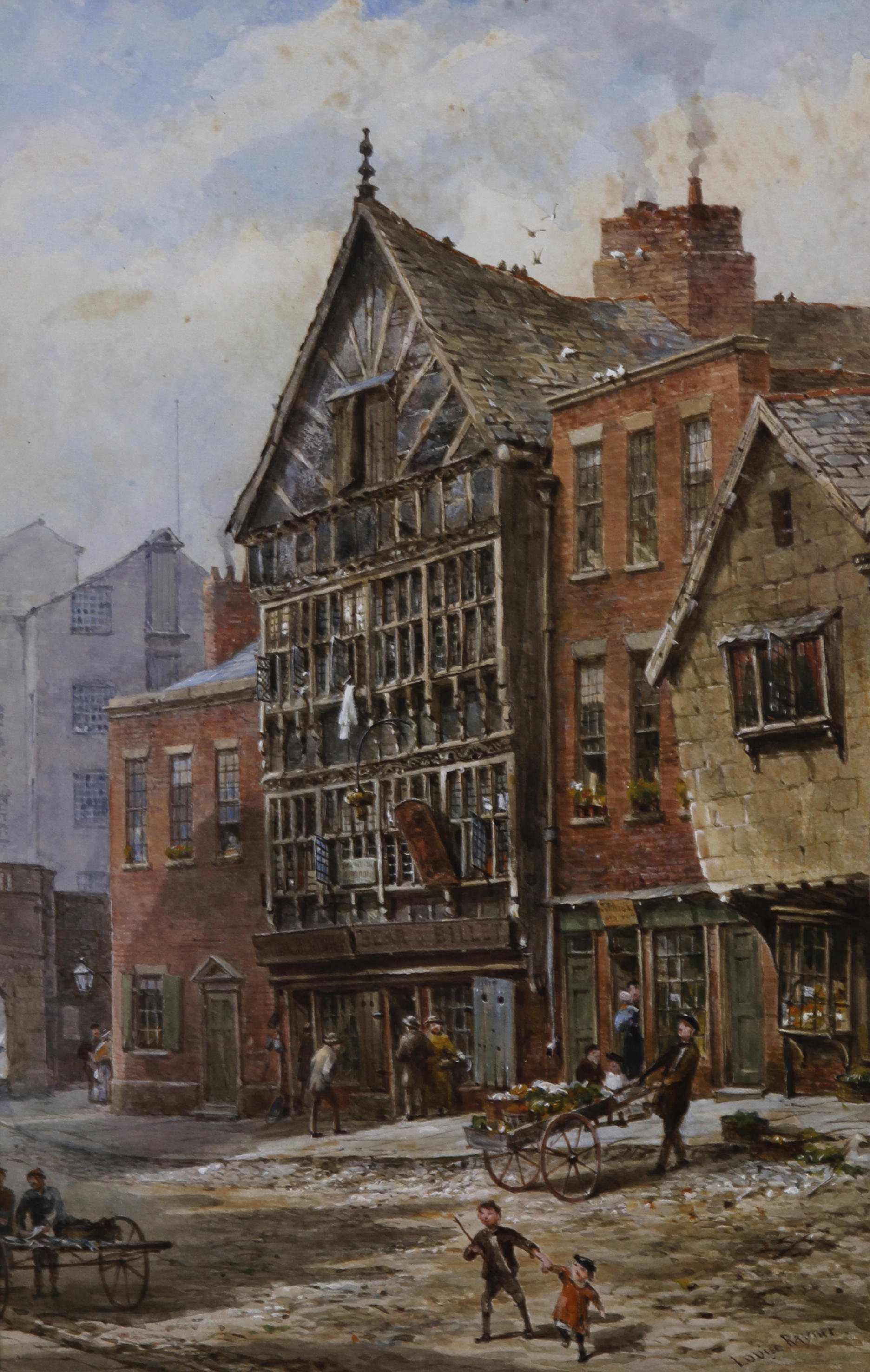
The Bear and Billet in the 19th century, as painted by Louise Rayner.

The house was built in 1664 as the town house of the Earls of Shrewsbury who held control of the nearby Bridgegate. It was also probably used as a grain warehouse because in the gable are double doors and a bracket for a hoist. The building became an inn in the 18th century, although it continued to be owned by the Shrewsbury family until 1867. Its name is taken from the heraldic device of the Earls that consist of a bear tied to a billet (or stake).

== Architecture ==
The building is constructed in timber framing with plaster panels. It consists of cellars, above which are three storeys and an attic in the gable overlooking the street. The roof has purple slates and a ridge at right-angles to the street. Each storey is jettied above the storey below. On the ground floor are two doors, one to the south and the other placed more centrally. To the right of each door is a three-light window. At the base of the first floor are 16 rectangular timber framed plaster panels. Above these is a window stretching along the whole length of the frontage; it is divided into 32 lights separated by mullions and transoms and containing leaded lights.

In the second floor storey are 12 arched timber framed panels. The window above these is similar to that in the first floor. Over this window is a row of 12 square decorated timber-framed panels. In the attic is a double timber door surrounded by panels. On each side of this door, and above it, are two-light windows containing leaded lights. In the apex of the gable is herringbone timber framing. The bargeboard is carved and has a finial at its peak.

== See also ==
- Media related to Bear & Billet, Chester at Wikimedia Commons
- Grade I listed buildings in Cheshire West and Chester
