= Barnaby's Tower =

Tower in Chester, Cheshire, England

Coordinates: 53.18763°N 2.88750°W

Barnaby's Tower stands at the southeast corner of the city walls of Chester, Cheshire, England. It is recorded in the National Heritage List for England as a designated Grade I listed building.

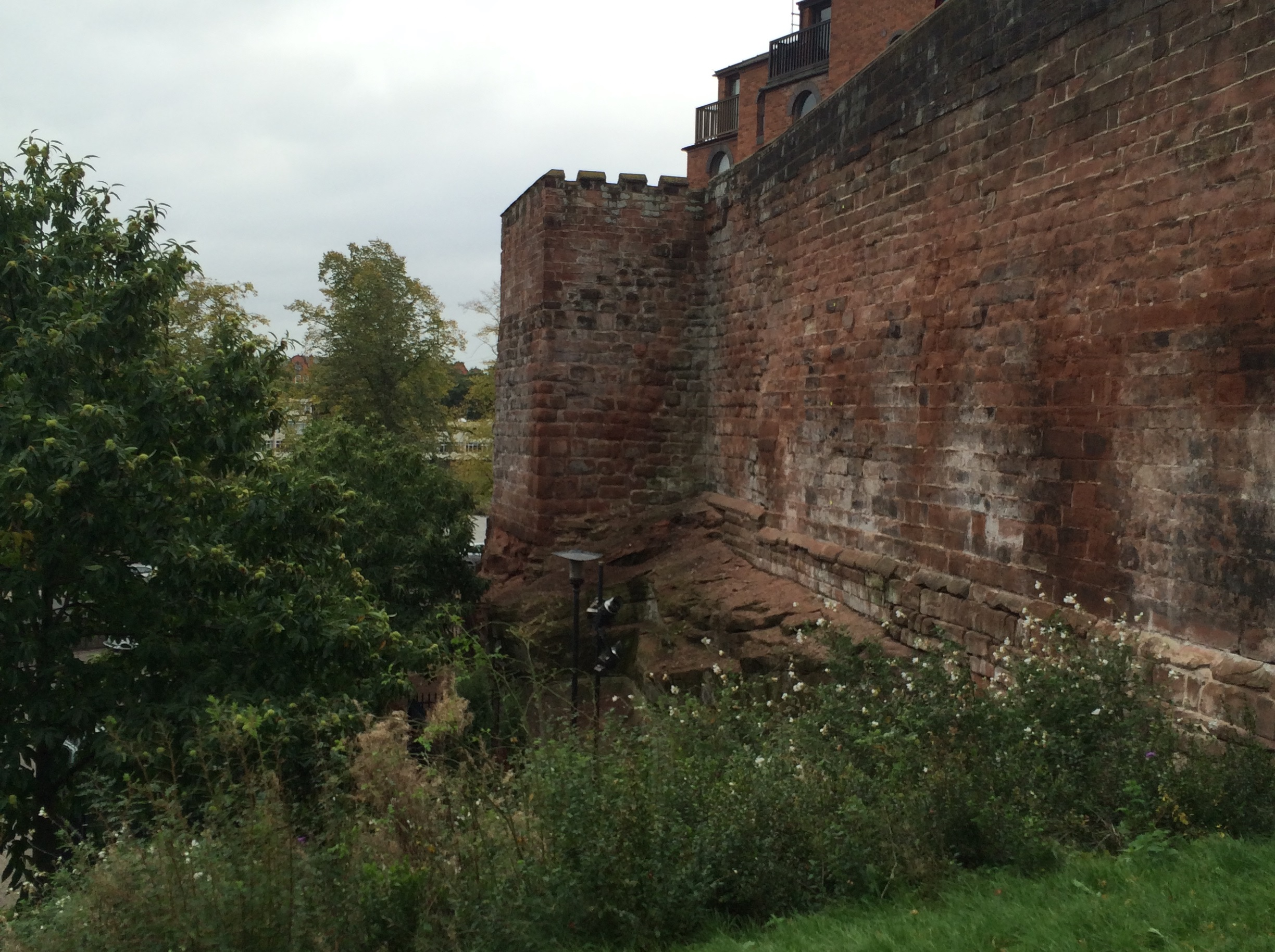
Barnaby's Tower, Chester England. A grade I listed building.

Map of central Chester, showing the line of the city walls and the gates, towers and wall sections of the medieval and post-medieval city.

[Hide/Show the list of Gates, Towers and Wall sections]
1 Bonewaldesthorne's Tower
2 Spur Wall and Water Tower
3 Wall between Bonewaldesthorne's Tower and Pemberton's Parlour
4 Pemberton's Parlour
5 Wall between Pemberton's Parlour and St Martin's Gate
6 St Martin's Gate
7 Wall between St Martin's Gate and Morgan's Mount
8 Morgan's Mount
9 Wall between Morgan's Mount and Northgate
10 Northgate
11 Wall between Northgate and Phoenix Tower
12 Phoenix Tower
13 Wall between Phoenix Tower and Kaleyard Gate
14 Kaleyard Gate
15 Wall between Kaleyard Gate and Eastgate
16 Eastgate
17 Wall between Eastgate and Thimbleby's Tower
18 Thimbleby's Tower
19 Wall between Thimbleby's Tower and Old Newgate
20 Old Newgate
21 Newgate
22 Wall between Newgate and Barnaby's Tower
23 Barnaby's Tower
24 Wall between Barnaby's Tower and the Drum Tower
25 Recorder's Steps
26 Drum Tower
27 Wall between the Drum Tower and Bridgegate
28 Bridgegate
29 Wall between Bridgegate and the former County Hall
30 Wall between former County Hall and Grosvenor Road
31 Wall between Grosvenor Road and Watergate
32 Watergate
33 Wall between Watergate and Bonewaldesthorne's Tower

The tower probably dates from the 13th century, and it was damaged in 1644–46 during the Civil War. When the city walls were converted into a raised walkway between 1702 and 1708, the tower was converted to form a feature at this corner. It has been repaired on occasions since, and in 1879–80 was altered at the expense of one of the city councillors.

The tower is constructed in coursed red sandstone rubble, and stands on a stony outcrop. It forms a three-sided projection from the walls, its top being level with the walkway, and is decorated with mock crenellation. There is no evidence of any chamber at a lower level.

== See also ==
- Grade I listed buildings in Cheshire West and Chester
