= 39 Bridge Street, Chester =

Grade I listed building in Chester, England

Coordinates: 53.1895°N 2.8912°W

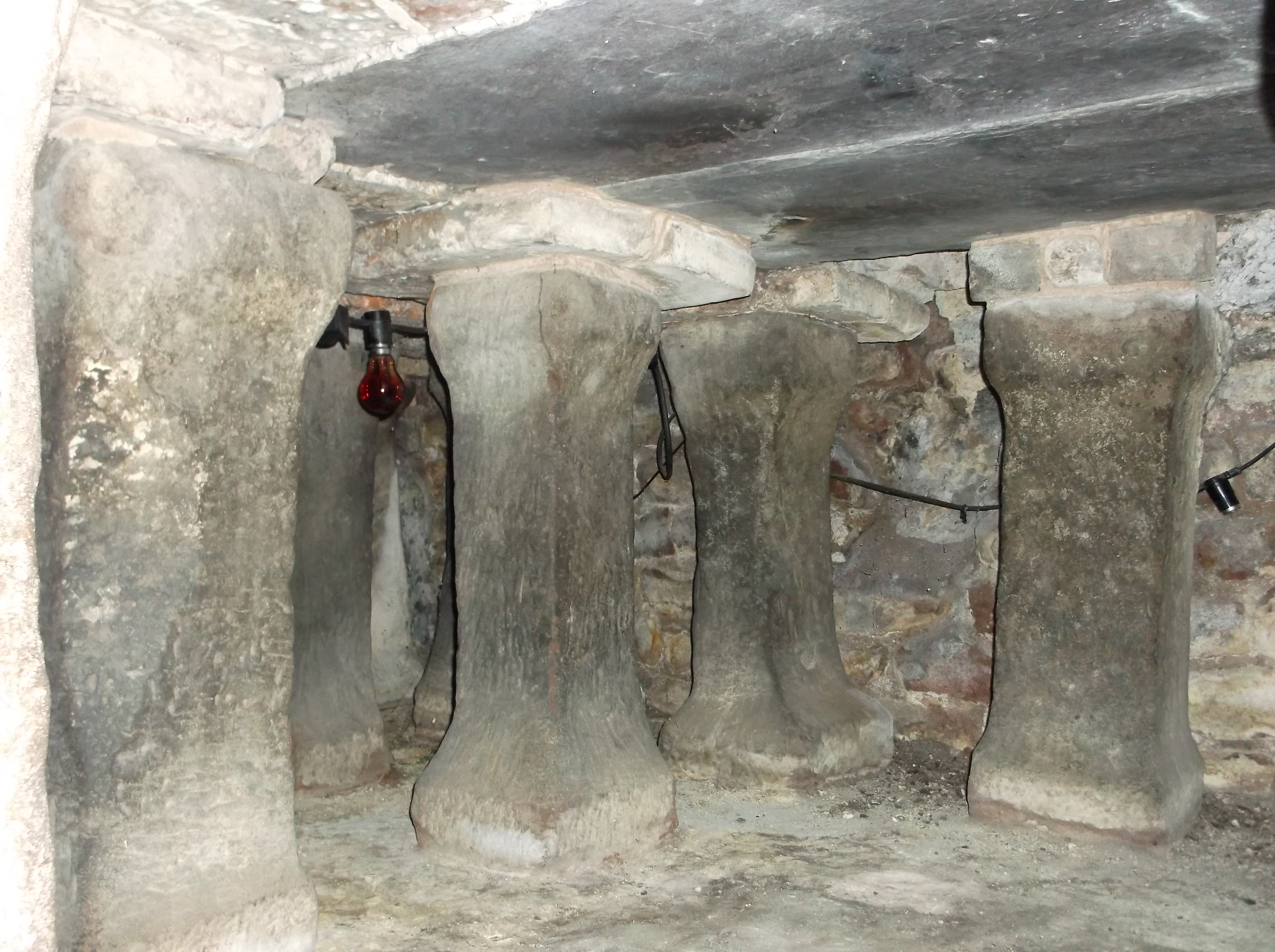
Part of the Roman remains in the cellar

39 Bridge Street is a building in Chester, Cheshire, England. It is recorded in the National Heritage List for England as a designated Grade I listed building, its major archaeological feature being the remains of a Roman hypocaust in its cellar.

The building has four storeys, with a shop at street level and a portion of Chester Rows in the storey above. The hypocaust in the cellar dates to the 2nd century during the Roman occupation of Chester. In the late 13th or early 14th century a medieval undercroft was built adjacent to the hypocaust, with a house above. In 1864 a new floor was inserted at street level and a shop front was added in the 20th century. The ground floor is now used as a café. The remains of the hypocaust were found during the reconstruction of the property in 1864. They consist of 27 square columns in a rectangular chamber which originally contained 32 columns in eight rows of four.

== See also ==
- Grade I listed buildings in Cheshire
