= Grade II listed buildings in Chester =

The city of Chester contains over 500 Grade II listed buildings. They have been split into four geographical areas:

- Grade II listed buildings in Chester (central)
- Grade II listed buildings in Chester (east)
- Grade II listed buildings in Chester (north and west)
- Grade II listed buildings in Chester (south)

== See also ==
- Grade I listed buildings in Cheshire
- Grade II* listed buildings in Cheshire
