= St Ursula's, Chester =

St Ursula's
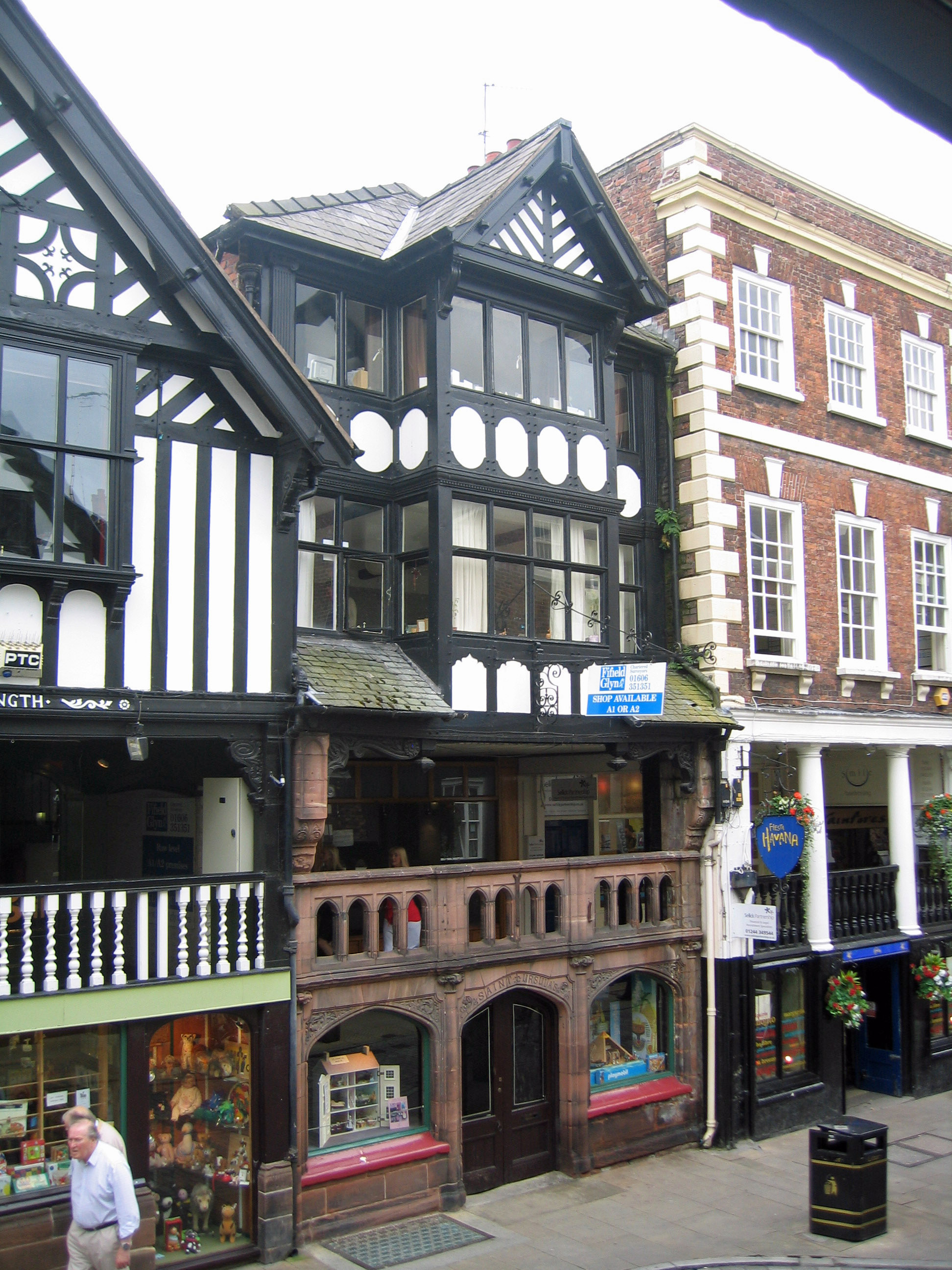
- St Ursula's

- Location in Cheshire
- 53.1899°N 2.8932°W
- Location: 37 Watergate Street, Chester, Cheshire, England
- OS grid reference: SJ 404 662

Listed Building – Grade I
- Designated: 28 July 1955
- Reference no.: 1376436

St Ursula's is a building at 37 Watergate Street, Chester, Cheshire, England. It incorporates a section of Chester Rows and is recorded in the National Heritage List for England as a designated Grade I listed building because of the quality of the undercroft.

The building originated somewhere between about 1180 and about 1280. Alterations were made in the 16th or 17th century and it was largely rebuilt above the Row level in the late 19th century and altered again in the 20th century. The building is in four storeys. It is built in sandstone at the street (undercroft) and Row levels and above this is timber-framed. The undercroft has 5½ bays and it is considered that the walls date from the late 12th century, and are therefore the earliest features yet to have been dated in the structure of the Rows.

The undercroft is currently in use as a storeroom for the neighbouring toy shop.

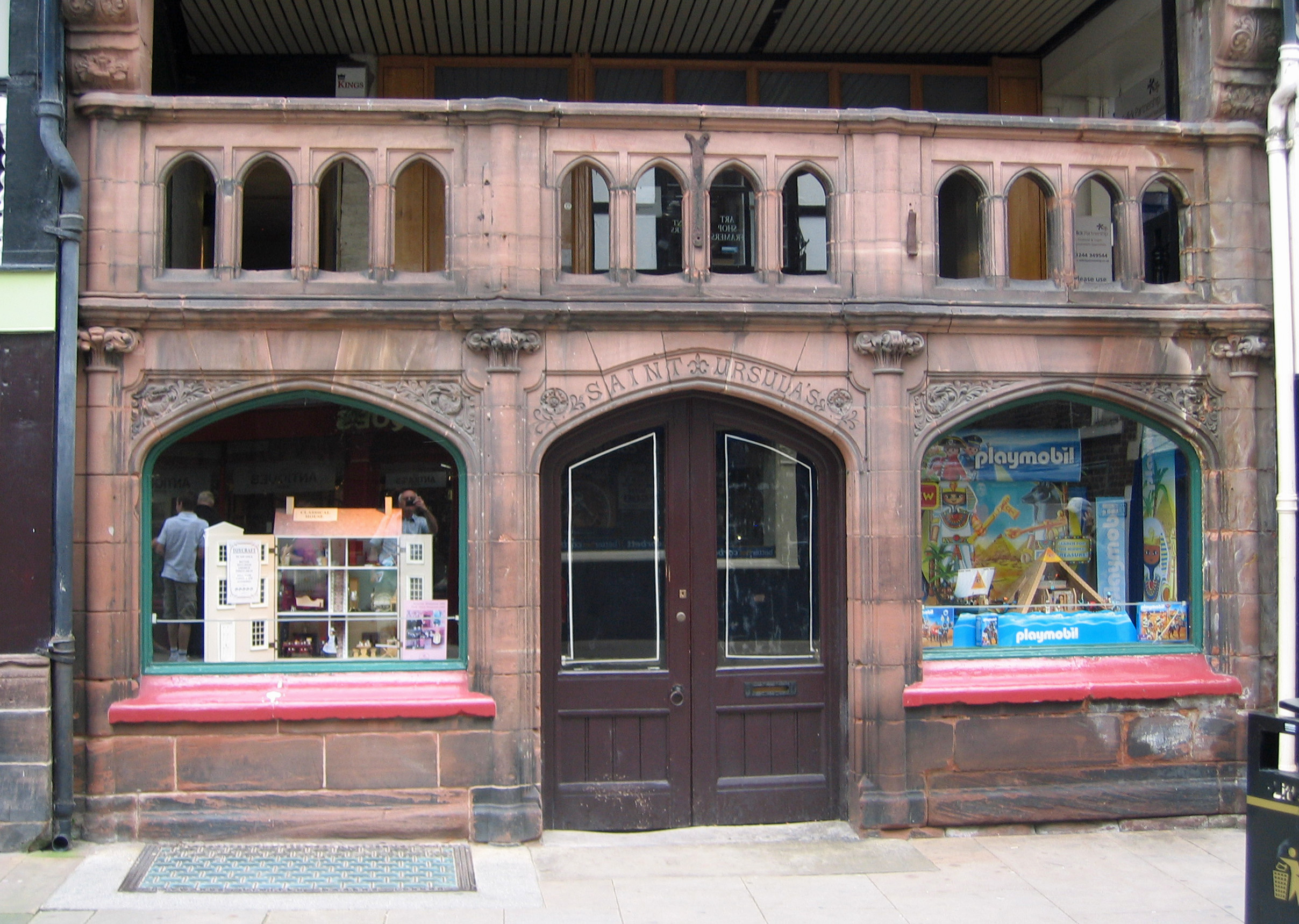
Shop frontage of St Ursula's showing the inscription

== See also ==
- Grade I listed buildings in Cheshire West and Chester
