= Ellis ap Griffith =

Baron of Gwyddelwern, Wales (c.1440-1489)

Ellis ap Griffith's arms, being those of Gwyddelwern, inherited from his grandfather Lord Tudor Glendower, from the maternal side

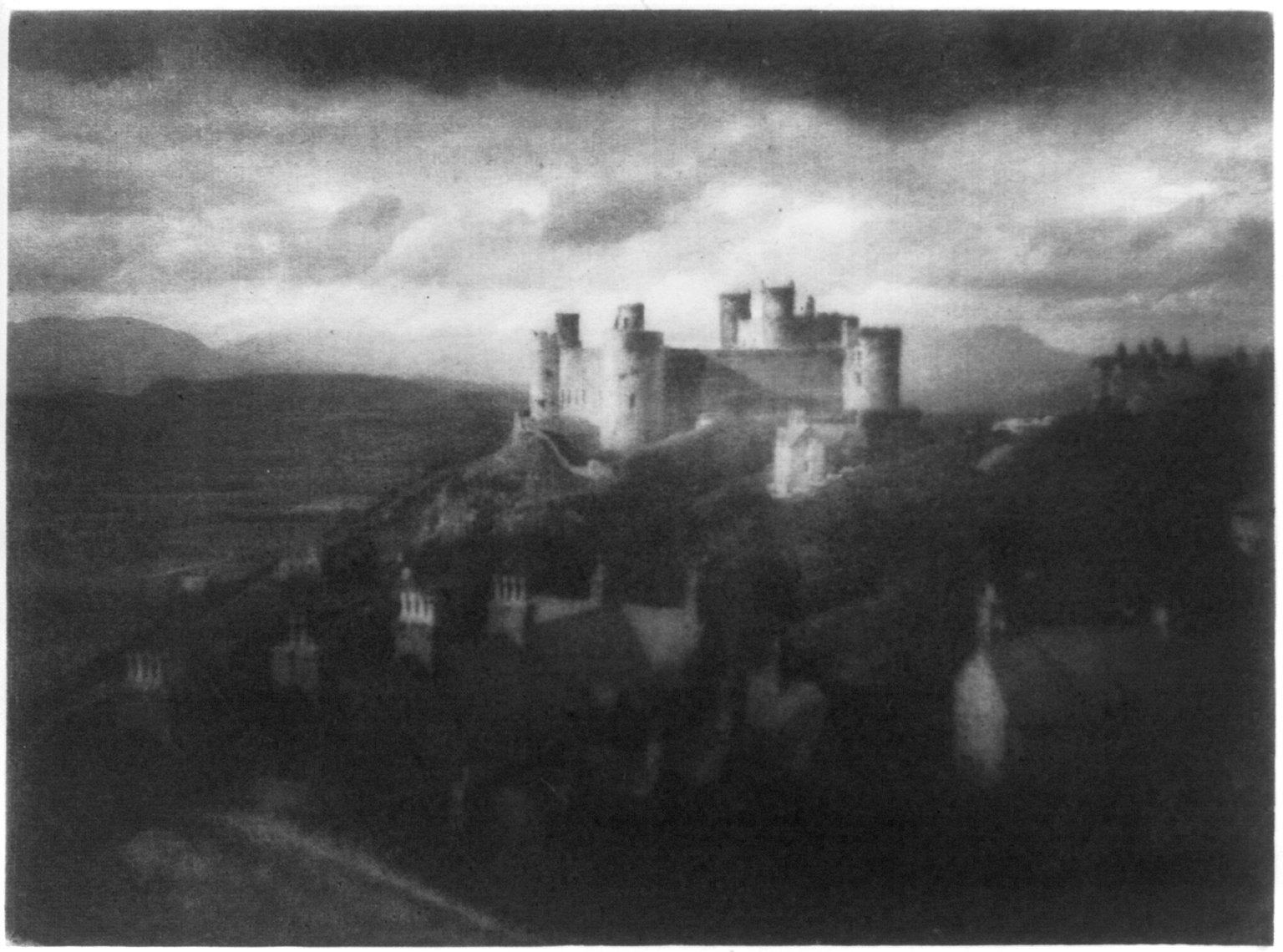
Harlech Castle, seat of his granduncle, Prince Owain Glendower, before losing the war against Shakespeare's "Prince Hal", historically known as Henry V

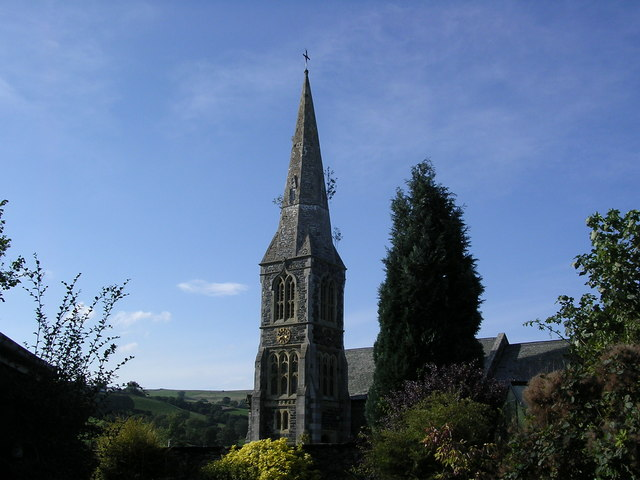
St Beuno church of Gwyddelwern

Ellis ap Griffith (c.1440 – 1489) or Elissau ap Gruffudd, was the Baron of Gwyddelwern in Denbighshire, Wales, and the Governor of Penllyn. His granduncle was Owen Glendower, Prince of Wales. Following his family defeat during the Glyndwr Rising, his branch inherited the co-representation of the Royal House of Powys, and were immortalized by William Shakespeare in the history play Henry IV. Through his mother Lowrie, he inherited the lordship of his grandfather, Tudor Glendower, and by marriage, the estate of Plas-yn-Yale. By this union, he became the founder of the House of Yale, represented by the Yale family, later known in America as the benefactors of Yale University.

== Biography ==
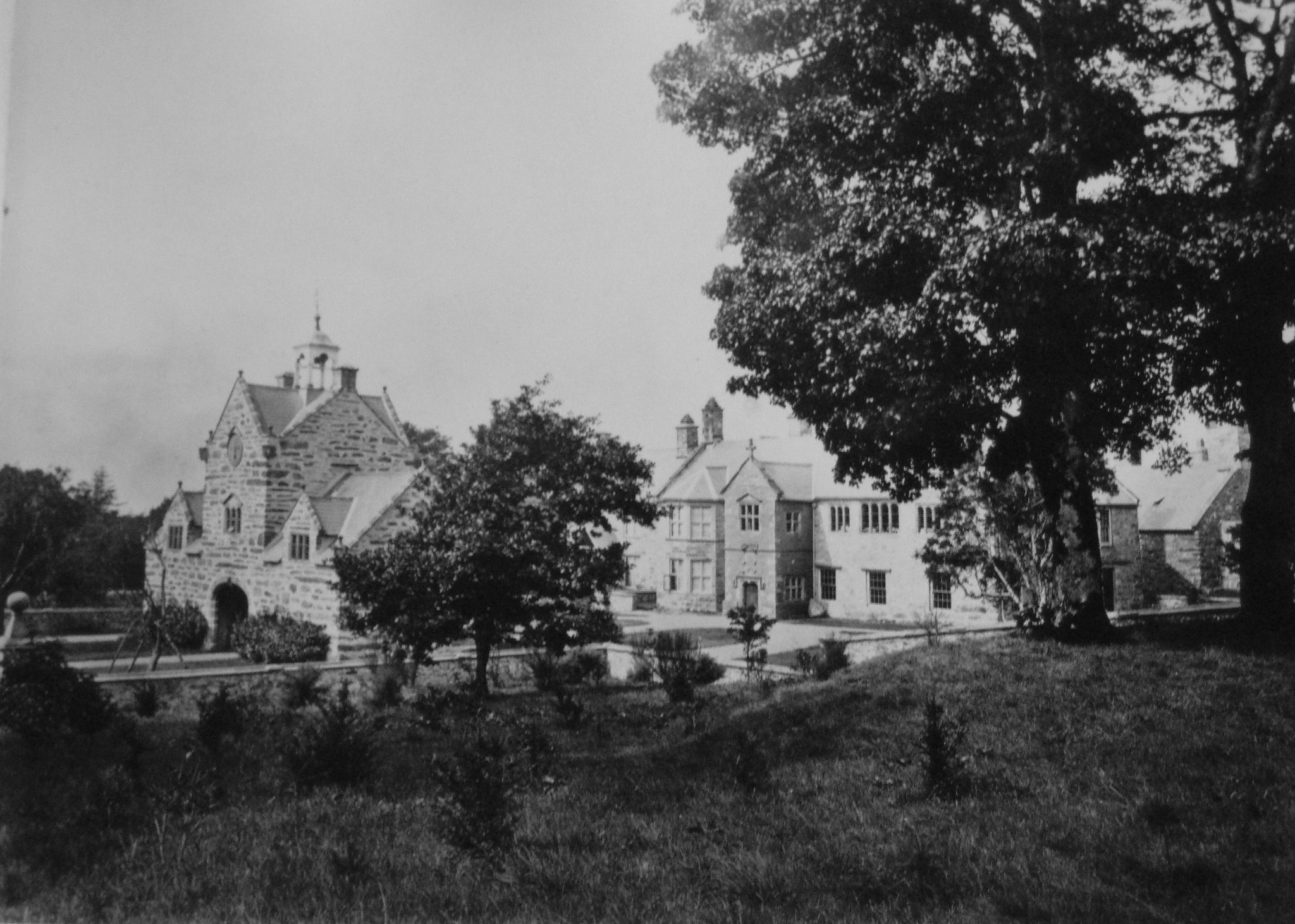
Estate of Corsygedol of Ellis's father, Griffith ap Einion, inherited from the Anglo-Normans Fitzgeralds

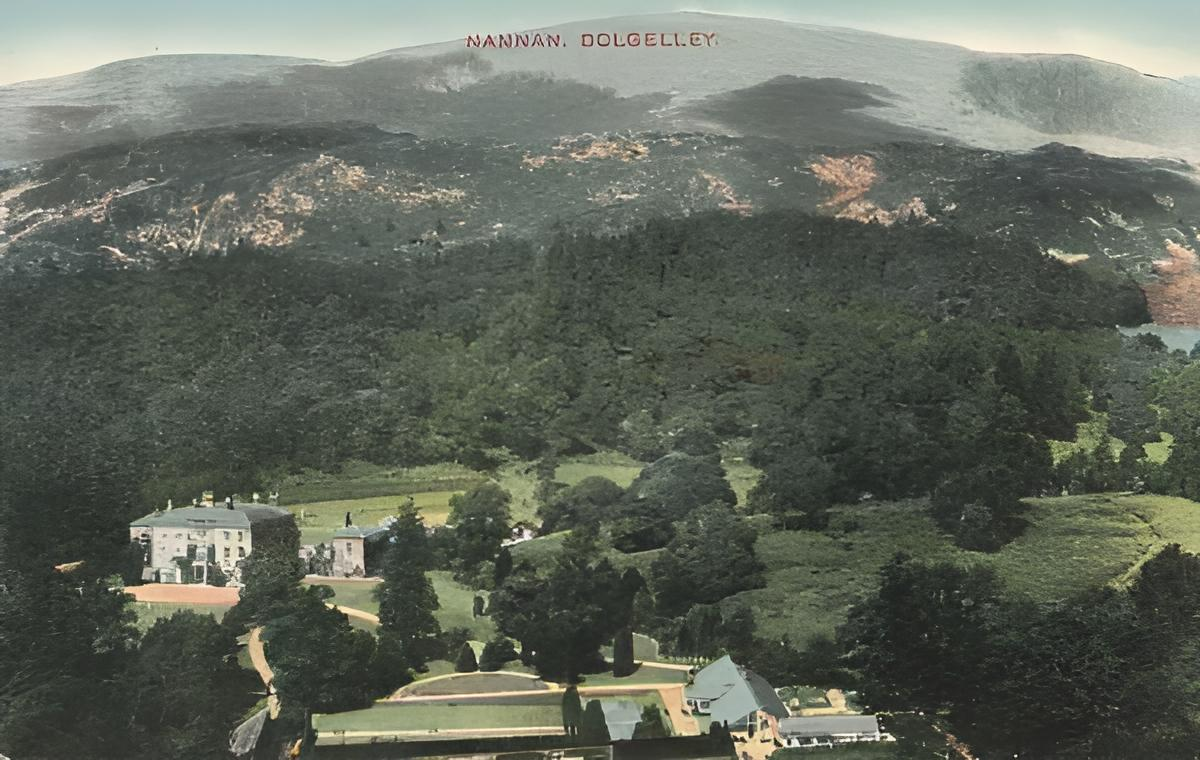
Nannau estate, Wales, of his uncle Howel Sele, family of Lord Hywel Sele

Ellis ap Griffith was born circa 1440, in Corwen, Denbighshire, to Griffith ap Einion of Corsygedol and Lowrie ap Tudur of Gwyddelwern, members of the Royal House of Mathrafal and the Ducal House of FitzGerald. His father Griffith ap Einion held the office of Woodward of the commote of Ardudwy, Merioneth, under the Lancastrian Henry V of England, and was proprietor of the Corsygedol estate, in his family since the 13th century. His grandfather was Lord Tudor Glendower, son of prince Gruffudd Fychan II.

His uncles were Ieuan ap Einion, 5th Baron of Edeirnion, and Howel Sele, of the family of Hywel Sele, 9th Lord of Nannau. His mother was first married to Robin ab Gruffydd, Lord of Rhos. Their family later married with the Lords of the Nannau estate, near Dolgellau, which has been in their possession for over 900 years, allying the descendants of King Bleddyn ap Cynfyn, founder of the House of Mathrafal, and rival of William the Conqueror.

His granduncle Owain Glendower, Prince of Wales, and other family members, launched the Glyndwr Rising against the Lancasters, in alliance with their kinsmen; the Percys, Mortimers, and Tudors of Penmynydd. Having lost the last Welsh War of Independence, Ellis's family were either killed at battle, imprisoned, or merciless put to death, and lost much of their estates and castles.

His mother Lowrie inherited the royal claims after the fall of the Royal House of Mathrafal, and transmitted to Ellis the lordship of Gwyddelwern from his grandfather. His family would later be featured in William Shakespeare's play Henry IV, Part 1 and Part 2, along Shakespeare's Henriad, with his granduncle being the rebel character Owen Glendower.

The Tudors of Penmynydd, their cousins through Tudor ap Goronwy, were also defeated, and a member, Owen ap Maredudd, emigrated to England and took the name of his grandfather, becoming Sir Owen Tudor, first of the House of Tudor. He married the widow of Henry V, Queen Catherine of France, and became the grandfather of the first Tudor monarch, Henry VII of England, father of Henry VIII. Owen Tudor was Ellis's second cousin, and Henry VII, Henry VIII, and Elizabeth Tudor were third cousins.

Ellis ap Griffith succeeded his grandfather's lordship of about 10 000 acres, holding the title of Baron of Gwyddelwern, and held the office of Raglot (Governor or ruler) of the commote of Penllyn, and Juror of the county of Merionethshire, under the Yorkist Edward IV of England. Ellis is also recorded in documents relating to the endowment of Cymer Abbey, which was committed to his charge and to Edmund Beaufort, Duke of Somerset, from which Sir Thomas Stanley, Chamberlain of North Wales, requested payment of debts and revenues for the region of Merionethshire.

== House of Yale ==

Lords of Yale

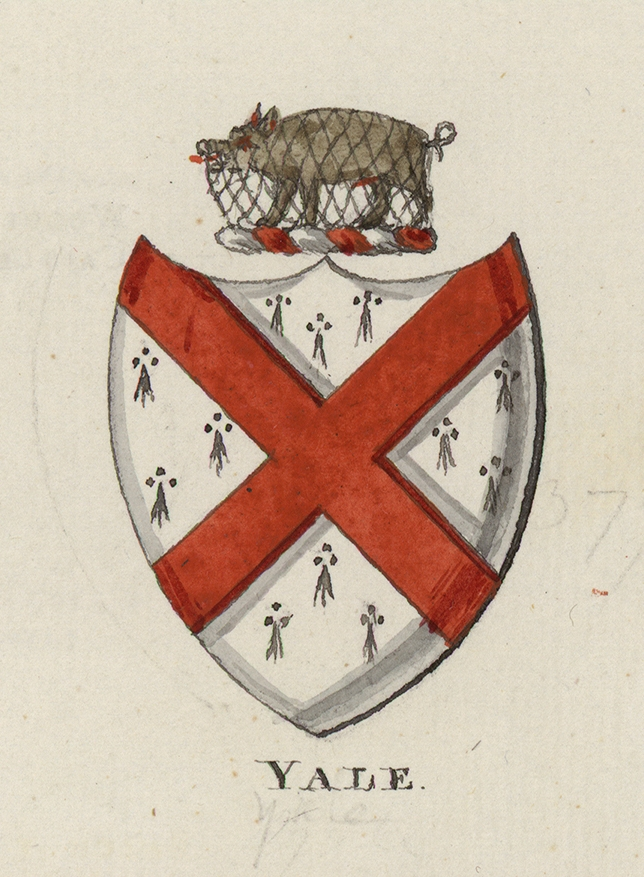
Left: Coat of arms showing the ancestry associated with the parent houses of the House of Yale, such as those of Powys, Powys Fadog, Dinefwr, Gwynedd and others, those of Yale in blue, and the Yale family of Plas-Grono with the red cross, from the Fitzgeralds of Corsygedol.

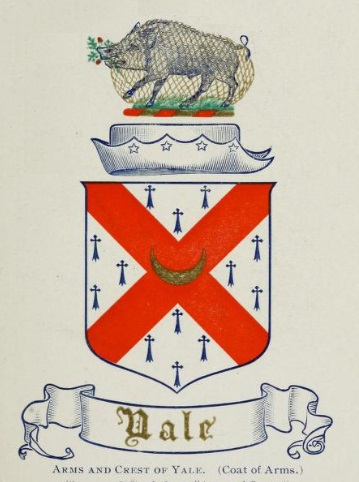
Coat of arms of the Yales of Plas-yn-Yale, inherited paternally from the Fitzgeralds of Corsygedol, crescent or for difference from the Yales of Plas-Grono

Ellis ap Griffith founded the House of Yale circa 1480, when he married Margaret, daughter of Jenkyn of Allt Llwyn Dragon (Dragon's Grove Hill), renamed Plas-yn-Yale. Through Ellis's mother Lowrie, the Yale family became cadets and co-representatives of four royal houses as co-heirs of Prince Owain Glyndwr, last Welsh Prince of Wales, along with the Hughes of Gwerclas. The name was adopted from the Lordship of Yale, previously the commote of Iâl in Welsh, which had belonged to his mother's family through four subsequent royal families, being those of Cunedda, Gwynedd, Dinefwr, and Mathrafal, since the foundation of the Kingdom of Gwynedd by their Romano-British ancestor Cunedda, its founding King in late Roman Britain. By this union came the usage of the Yale name as a surname, adopted from the maternal side, a practice that was adopted later by Chancellor Thomas Yale, first of the name.

The Lion of the Kingdom of Powys, the emblem of Mathrafal, inherited from the Princes of Powys Fadog, Lords of Yale, is featured as the Black Lion on Ellis's coat of arms. Ellis bore both the arms of Gwyddelwern as Baron and heir of his grandfather, Lord Tudur ap Gruffudd, and those of his father Gruffydd ab Einion (Vaughan) of Corsygedol, which was inherited in the male line from Osborne Fitzgerald of the Fitzgerald dynasty, through the branch of the Lords Desmond, later Earls of Desmond. Osborne was an Anglo-Norman who descended from Gerald de Windsor of Carew Castle, son of the 1st Governor of Windsor Castle for William the Conqueror. He came from Ireland to Wales during the middle of the 13th century, and was granted estates and arms by the Prince of North Wales, Llywelyn the Great.

Over time, the Yales married with their cousin branch, the Hughes of Gwerclas, and other noble houses of Britain, such as the Cavendishs, Dukes of Devonshire, and the Norths, Earls of Guilford. Lord North of Wroxton Abbey, the British Prime Minister who lost the American War of Independence under his term, was a cousin. Thomas Yale of Plas-yn-Yale married the daughter of the 14th Baron of Cymmer-yn-Edeirnion, and their daughter Dorothy Yale, married the 16th Baron. In the early 19th century, Sarah Yale, head of the House of Yale, and last of the direct male line, died without children. As an heraldic heiress, the Plas-yn-Yale estate and coat of arms were entailed in her will, making Lt. Col. William Parry-Jones, her cousin, the new heir general of the House, and exchanged by Royal licence 1867, his name and arms for those of Yale, becoming Lt. Col. William Parry Yale.

His nephew, Oxford lawyer William Corbet Yale, succeeded him, and also inherited Widcombe Manor and Madryn Castle from his cousin, Sir Thomas Love-Jones-Parry, son of Lt. Gen. Sir Love Jones-Parry. He was also of the family of Admiral Robert Lloyd, who fought against America and brought back to England the body of Maj. Gen. Sir Edward Pakenham, the brother-in-law of the Duke of Wellington. His heir was Oxford lawyer John Edward Ivor Yale, son-in-law of Sir Henry Lewis of Belmont, and member of the family of William Debonaire Haggard and the Haggards, who were admirals and bankers in the City of London. As of 1969, the Yales were still featured as members of the British nobility in Burke's book of the landed gentry, and in 2021 died from this branch Queen's Counsel David Yale of Snowdonia.

== Family ==
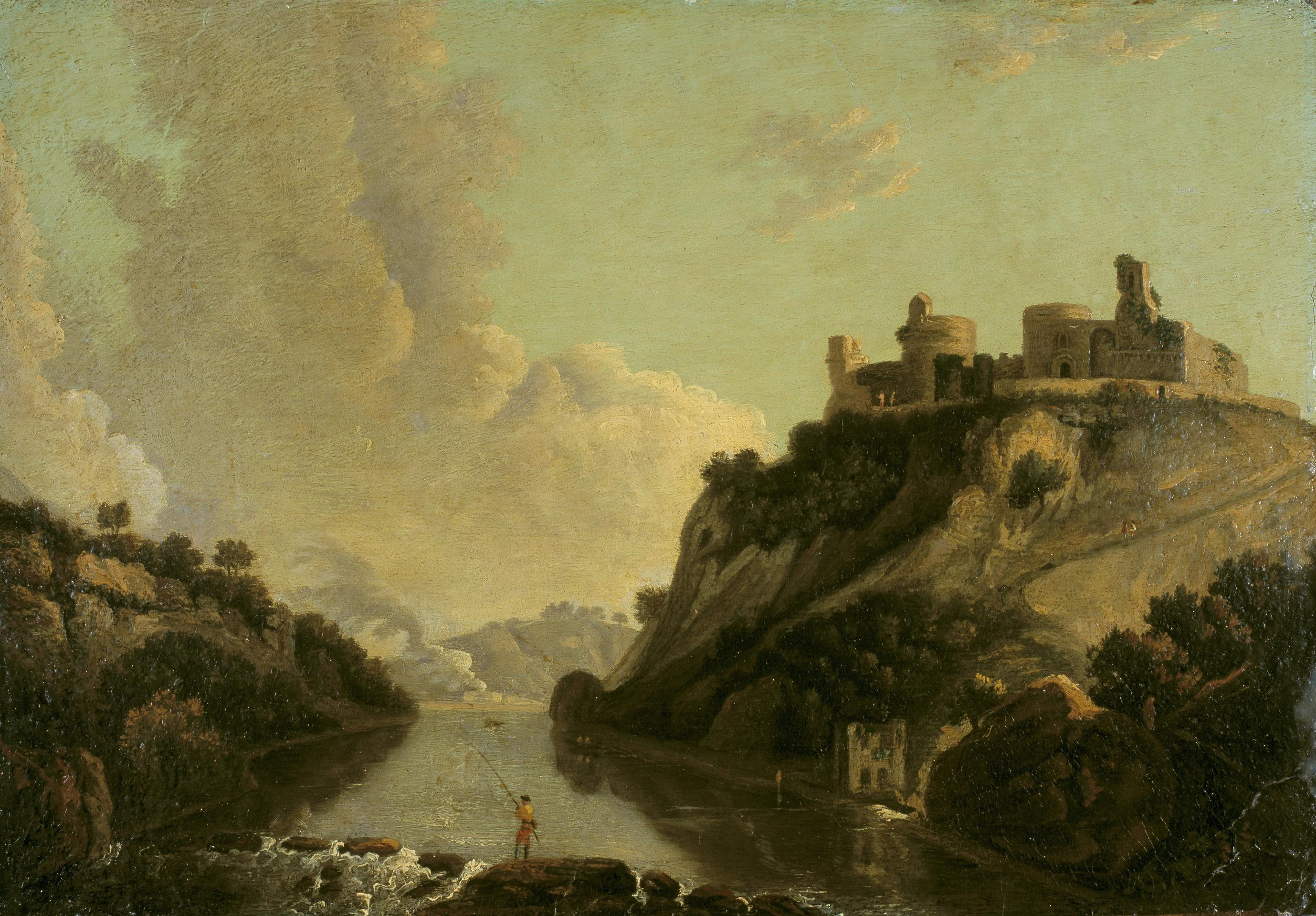
Cilgerran Castle, seat of Ellis's brother and nephew, granted by their cousin, King Henry Tudor

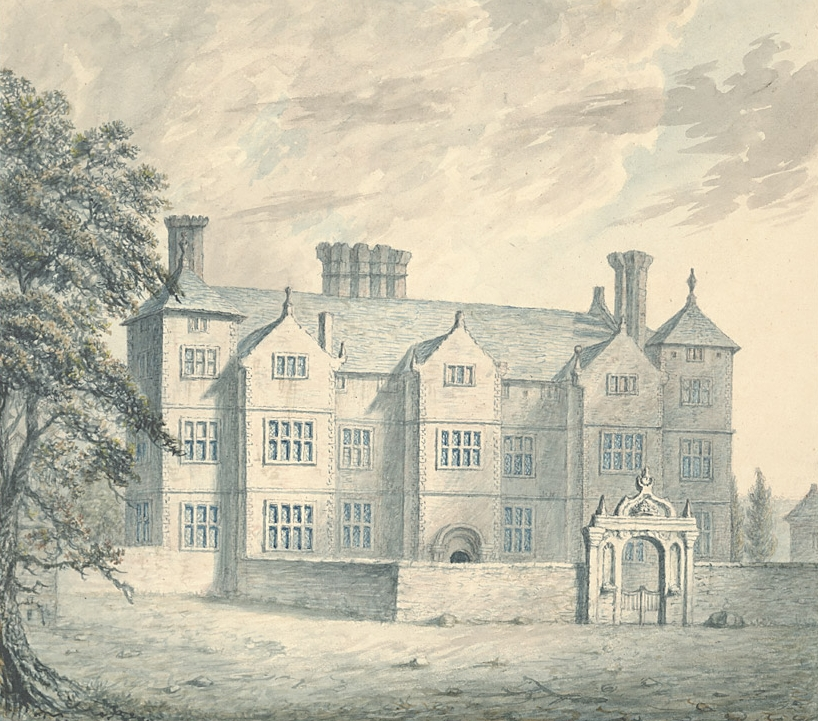
Grafton Hall, 1793, a property of the Stanley family

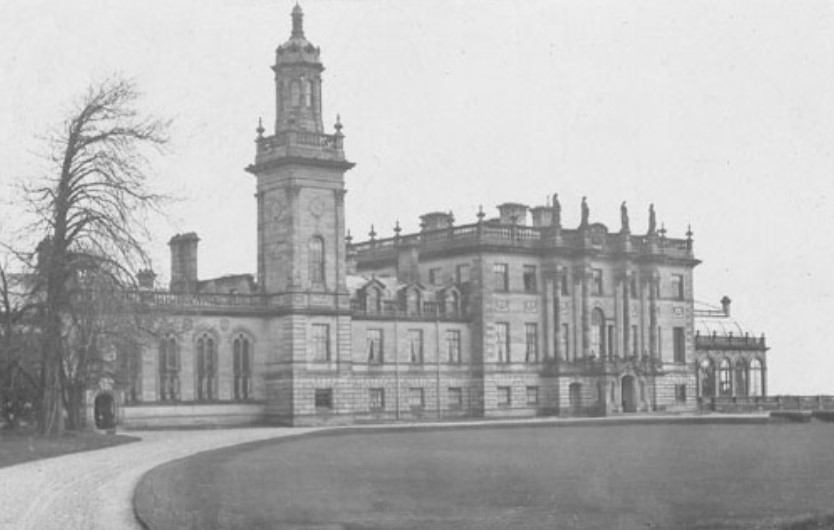
Hooton Hall, estate of the Stanley family of Flintshire, Storeton, Eastham, Burton and others

Ellis ap Griffith's siblings were :

- Gruffydd Fychan (Vaughan), who married to Maud Clement, daughter and coheir of Sir John Clement, Lord of Tregaron, family of John of the same name, Justiciar of South Wales, and slain in 1293. Her maternal grandfather was Gruffudd ap Nicolas while her cousin was the famed Sir Rhys ap Thomas. She was previously married to Sir John Wogan of Wiston, the nephew of William Herbert, 1st Earl of Pembroke, and Sir Richard Herbert of Coldbrook, brothers-in-law of Sir Rhys ap Thomas. Gruffydd would inherit the Corsygedol estate from the line of Osborne Fitzgerald, and his branch would continue through :

- Margaret Wynn, who married Sir Roger Mostyn, 5th Baronet of Mostyn Hall, great-grandson of the 2nd Earl of Nottingham of Burley Manor, and nephew and cousin of the Duchess and Duke of Roxburghe of Floors Castle.

- Charlotte Mostyn, who married Sir Thomas Swymmer Mostyn-Champneys, 2nd Bt of the Orchardleigh Estate.
- Elizabeth Mostyn, who married Sir Edward Pryce Lloyd, 2nd Bt of Mostyn Hall Their son, MP Edward Mostyn, married the daughter of the Earl of Clonmell.
- Anna-Maria Mostyn, who married Sir Robert Williames Vaughan, 2nd Bt of Nannau Hall

- Tudor ap Gruffydd, who married to Margery (Gwenhwyfar) Stanley, daughter of Piers Stanley, Esquire of Ewloe Castle, Flintshire. He was from the family of Sir William Stanley of Hooton, a knight of the Stanley family, brother of Sir John Stanley, King of Mann.

Ellis's brother Gruffydd was one of the tree captains who held out Harlech Castle against the Yorkists, siding with his cousin, the previous Earl of Pembroke, Jasper Tudor, later Duke of Bedford. Gruffydd was Jury foreman under Henry VI of England. He later hided at his home in Corsygedol Jasper and Henry, Earl of Richmond, on their way to exile in France.

When Henry came back, he won the Battle of Bosworth Field, becoming the new King of England and first monarch of the House of Tudor, and rewarded Gruffydd with the office of Governor of Cilgerran Castle and others immunities. He was also made Esquire of the Body to King Henry Tudor and a member of his court.

His son, William Vaughan, Ellis's nephew, was granted the castle by Henry, became Lord of Cilgerran, Pembrokeshire, High Sheriff of Cardiganshire, and his descendants lived at the castle until the 17th century. He also married Margaret Perrot, daughter of Sir William Perrot and Jane Wogan. She was a grandniece of William Herbert, 1st Earl of Pembroke, and the great-granddaughter of Sir William ap Thomas of Raglan Castle.

Ellis's grandsons followed the rise of their cousins, and served them as Secretary to Henry VIII's head of state, Cardinal Wolsey of Hampton Court, through Roger Lloyd Yale, and as Chancellor to the head of the Anglican Church and ambassador to the Virgin Queen, through Dr. Thomas Yale. Thomas's patron, Archbishop Matthew Parker, was Anne Boleyn and Elizabeth's chaplain during her childhood before her mother's execution. Ellis's cousin, Roger Puleston, son of Robert Puleston, commanded Denbigh Castle for Jasper Tudor during the War of the Roses, and a great-grandson, Dr. David Yale, became Chancellor of Chester. He also married his son Thomas Yale to the daughter of the Bishop of Chester during Elizabeth's reign.

== Marriage ==
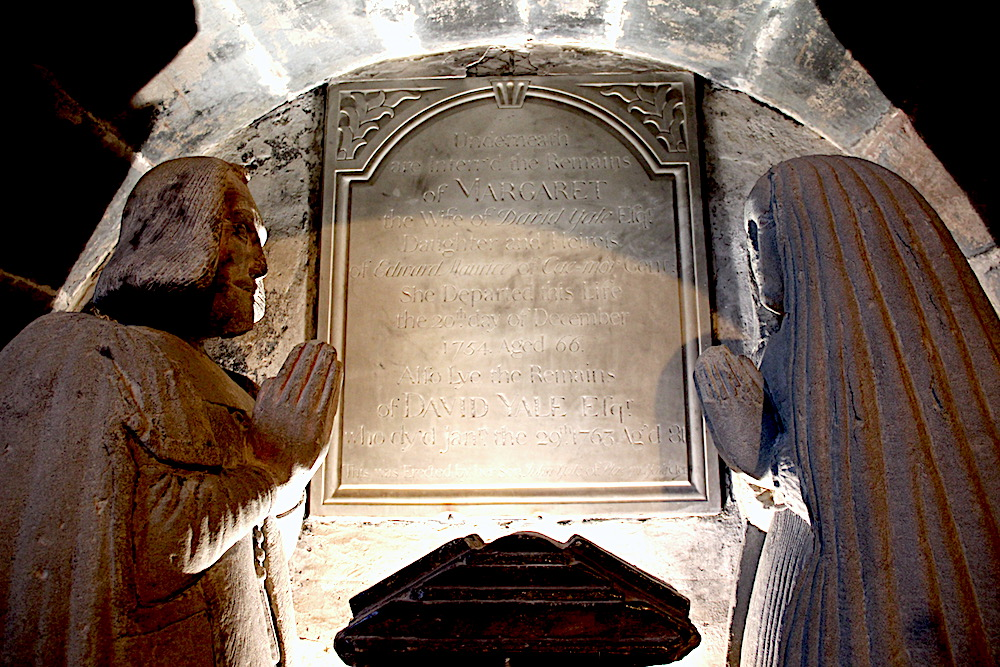
Esquire David Yale, Yale family memorial, St Oswald's church, Oswestry, England, close to the Welsh borders

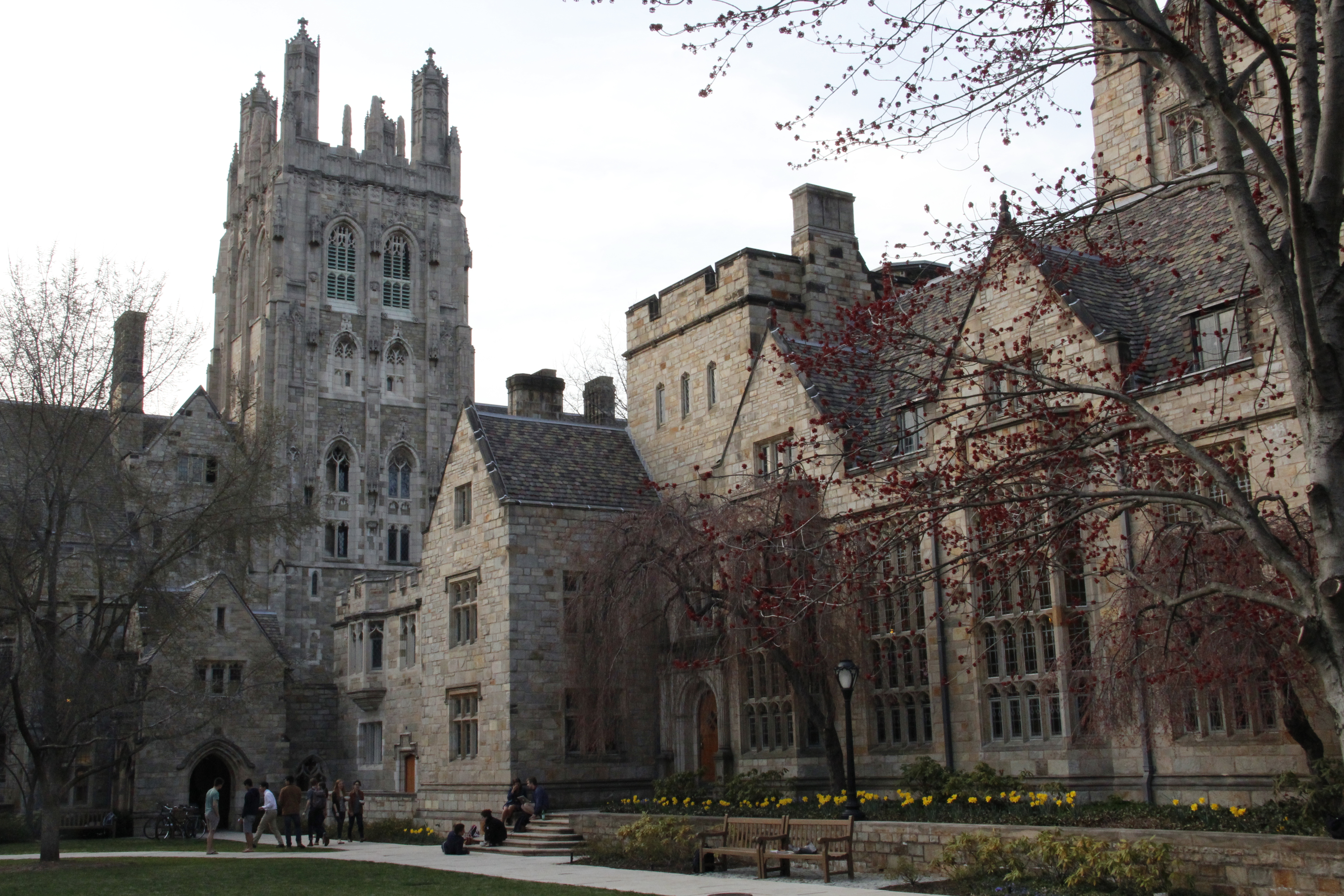
Wrexham Tower at Yale University's Saybrook College, modelled after St Giles' Church, where Yale's benefactor tomb lies

Ellis ap Griffith died in 1489. With his wife Margaret, daughter of Jenkyn of Allt Llwyn Dragon (Plas-yn-Yale), they had seven sons. She was a descendant of the Lord of Gelligynan, holder of the Manor of Gelligynan. They had the following children :

- Gruffydd ab Elissau, ancestor of the Lloyds of Carrog and Rhagad
- John Wynn of Bryn Tangor
- Richard of Meardy in Gwyddelwern. He married Gwen, daughter of leuan ab Dafydd ab leuan ab Gwin of Branas Isaf, one of the Barons of Edeyrnion
- Jenkyn ap Ellis
- Tudor of Llys Fassi, who married Eleanor, daughter of John Conwy of Bodrhyddan Hall, by whom he had an only daughter and heiress, Gwenhwyfar, who married Edward Lloyd of Gelli Gynan, ancestor of the Lloyds of Llys Fassi
- Ieuan Lloyd of Rhagad in Edeyrnion
- David Lloyd Iâl (Yale), who married to Gwenhwyfar, daughter of Richard Lloyd. He was the heir of Plas-yn-Yale, in the Lordship of Bromfield and Yale, and father of the Yales of Plas-yn-Yale and Plas Grono

David Lloyd Yale had five sons and three daughters, including John Wynn Yale and Chancellor Thomas Yale, uncle of Chancellor David Yale, the grandfather of Capt. Thomas Yale, and great-grandfather of Elihu Yale, benefactor of Yale University in the United States. Thomas Yale built the Yale Chapel during his time serving Elizabeth Tudor as ambassador, a cousin, not far from the ancestral church of Yale named Valle Crucis Abbey.

The branch that emigrated to America was the Yale family of Plas-Grono, family of David Yale, and became prominent in various fields, including commerce, education, theology, politics and military service.
