= David Yale (chancellor) =

Chancellor of Chester, England (c. 1540–1626)

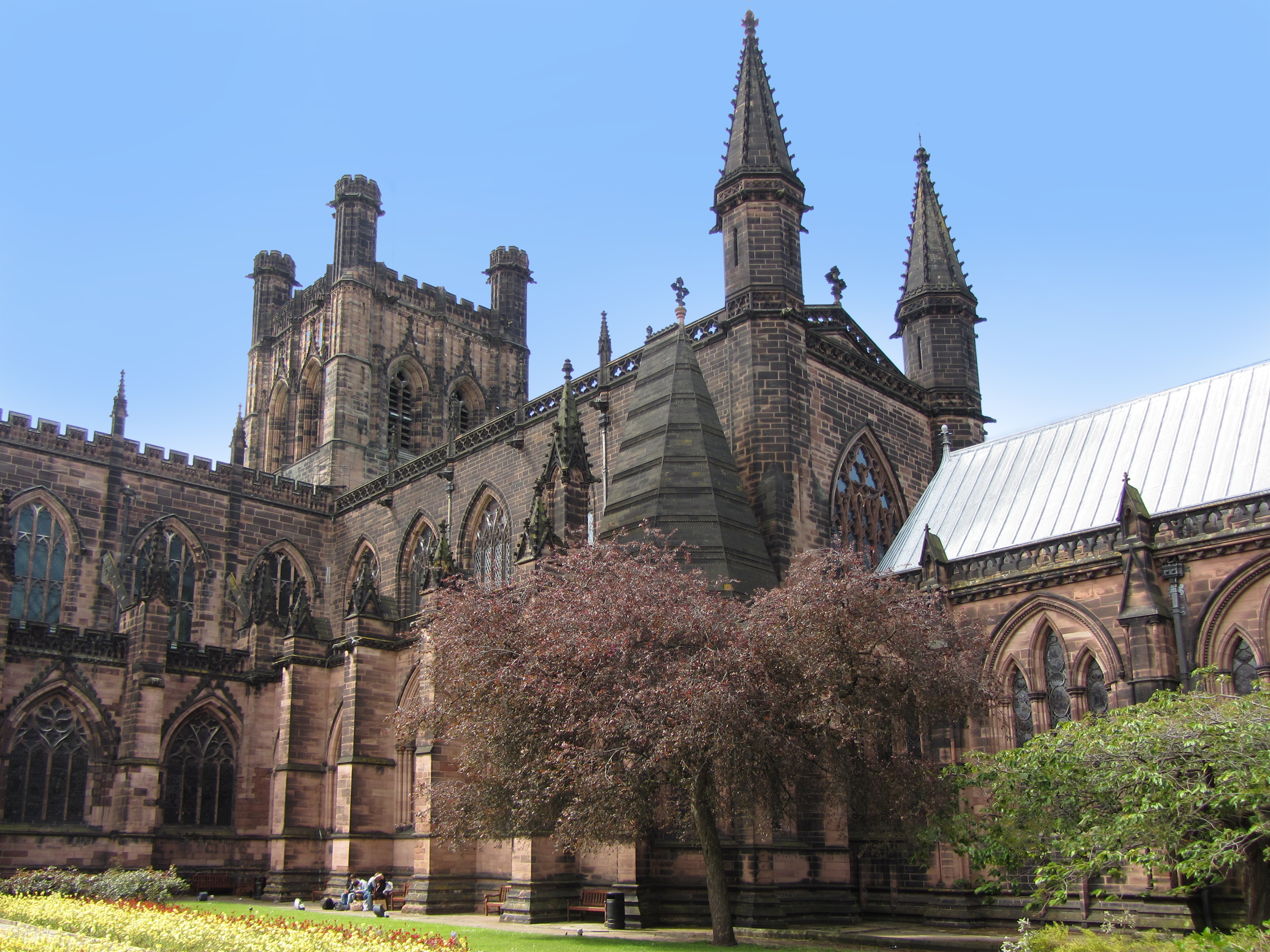
Chester Cathedral in the city of Chester, David Yale was its Chancellor and was buried within the grounds

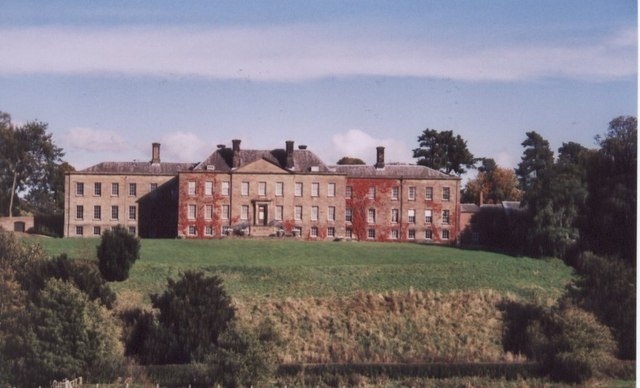
Erddig Hall, built on the original Erddig estate of Chancellor David Yale, sold generations later by his heirs

David Yale (c. 1540–1626) was the Chancellor of Chester, England and a correspondent of Elizabeth Tudor's chief minister, Lord William Cecil of Burghley House. He was also the Vicar General of his in-law, Bishop George Lloyd of Chester. His son, merchant Thomas Yale, became the patriarch of the Yale family of America, and the grandfather of governor Elihu Yale, benefactor of Yale University.

== Early life ==
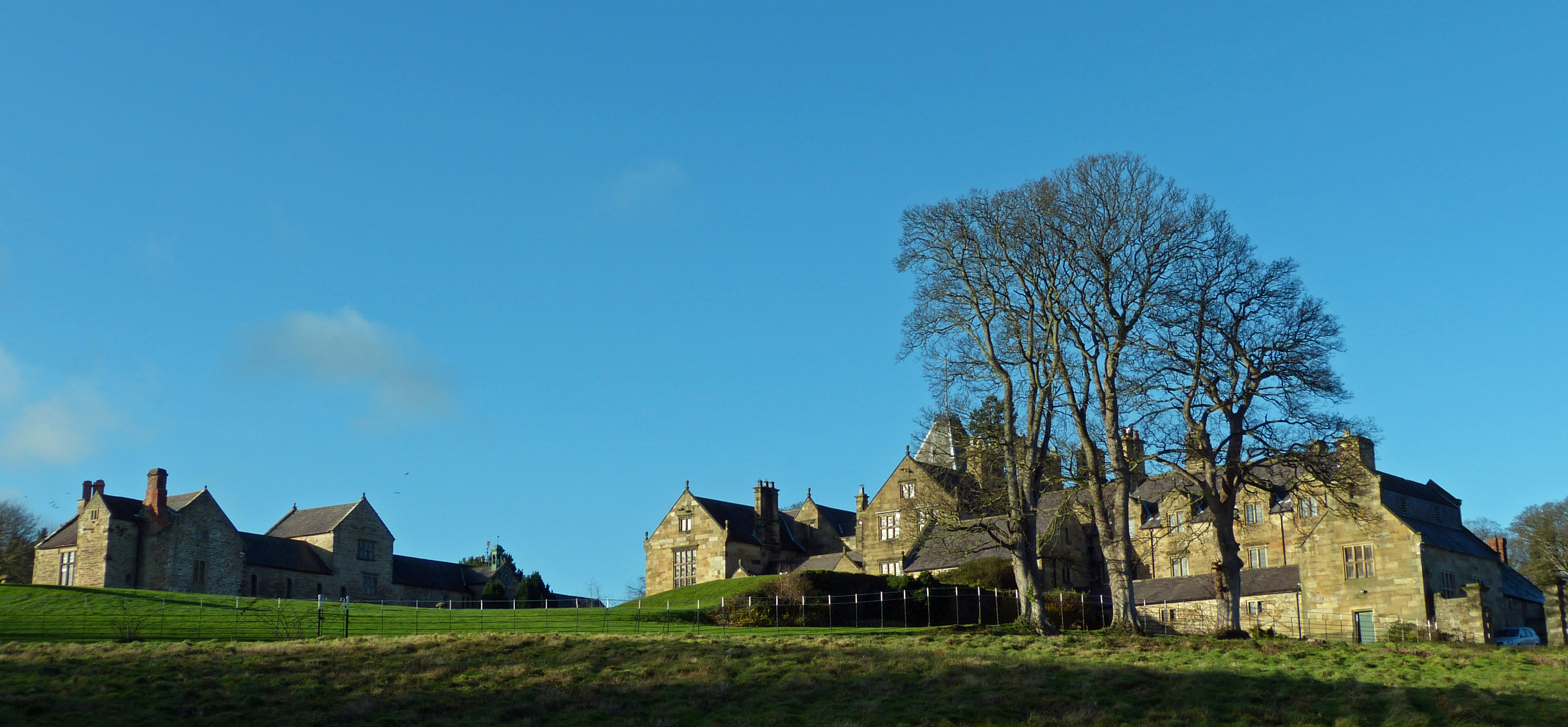
Mostyn Hall, Wales, of the Mostyn family, Grade I listed building

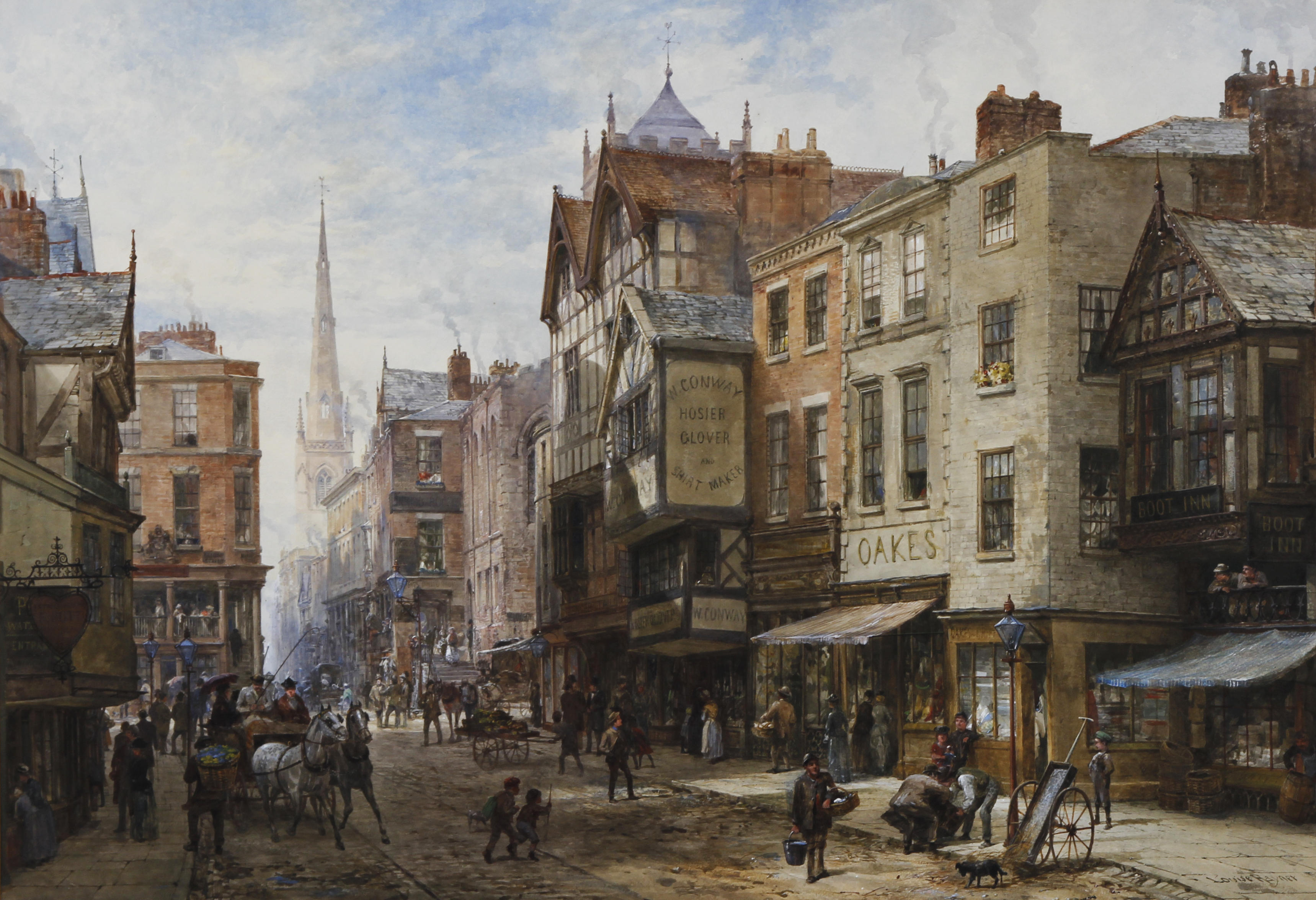
Painting of Chester, the Cross looking towards Watergate Street, by artist Louise Rayner

David Yale was born about 1540 to John Wynn (Yale), heir of Plâs yn Iâl, and Agnes Lloyd, while his stepmother was Elizabeth Mostyn, granddaughter of Sir William Griffith, Chamberlain of North Wales. Through William, Yale's half-siblings descended from Tudur ap Goronwy of the Tudors of Penmynydd. David Yale's great-grandfather was Baron Ellis ap Griffith, founder of the House of Yale, and grandnephew of Owain Glyndwr, last Welsh Prince of Wales.

His half-brother, Thomas Yale, married Margaret Puleston, granddaughter of Sir John Puleston, Constable of Caernarfon Castle and Chamberlain of North Wales, while his half-sister Jane Yale, married Joseph Haynes, son of Tudor Ambassador Simon Heynes. His aunt Joanna was also the widow of Ambassador Heynes, who was one of those who invalidated the marriage of Henry VIII with Queen Anne of Cleves.

His uncle was Chancellor Thomas Yale of Newberry Manor in London, Ambassador to Elizabeth Tudor, and Chancellor to Archbishop Parker, who was the head of the Church of England, and the past chaplain of Queen Anne Boleyn.

== Career ==
Yale followed his uncle at Queens' College, Cambridge in 1555. He became a Fellow of the university from 1565 to 1581. On graduating B.A. he was presented to the rectory of Llandegla from 1564 to 1573, and in 1578, he succeeded to his uncle's prebend at St. Asaph Cathedral, taking the degree of Doctor of Law in the following year. He also held a master's degree from Cambridge University.

In July 1578, David Yale, as a fellow from Queens', wrote to William Cecil, Elizabeth's chief minister and Chancellor of Cambridge University, begging that if Dr. William Chaderton (the current President of Queens' College) was made Bishop of Chester, Robert Dudley, 1st Earl of Leicester might not be allowed to exert his influence over the fellows in favour of Humphrey Tyndall, whom he considered to be unfit to be president because of his youth and inexperience.

Despite his letter, Tyndall was elected President of Queens' College in July 1579 on the recommendation and through the influence of Lord Cecil. With cleric Edmund Meyrick of the Meyrick family, he administered the see of Bangor Cathedral in the vacancy between the episcopates of Bishops Nicholas Robinson and Hugh Bellot of Great Moreton Hall in 1585. He became prebendary of Chester in 1582 and Chancellor of the diocese in 1587, by Lord Bishop William Chaderton.

In 1598, he made extensive purchases of land from the Erddig family of Erddig near Wrexham, Wales, selling some but keeping Plas Grono as the family seat until it was sold by the heirs-at-law of his great-grandson Elihu Yale, benefactor of Yale University in America.

They sold the estate, including Erddig House, to Sir George Wynne of Leswood Hall, designed by Francis Smith, an architect of Aston Hall and Sutton Scarsdale Hall, and afterwards, it was sold to John Meller (1665–1733), Master of the High Court of Chancery. From 1601 to 1620, Yale was elected Justice of the Peace and in 1607, he became the Vicar General of his in-law, Bishop George Lloyd of Chester. Bishop Lloyd residences were Bishopscourt, Isle of Man and Bishop Lloyd's House in Chester, part of Chester Rows. Chancellor David Yale died in 1626 and was buried at Chester Cathedral, England.

== Family ==
=== England ===
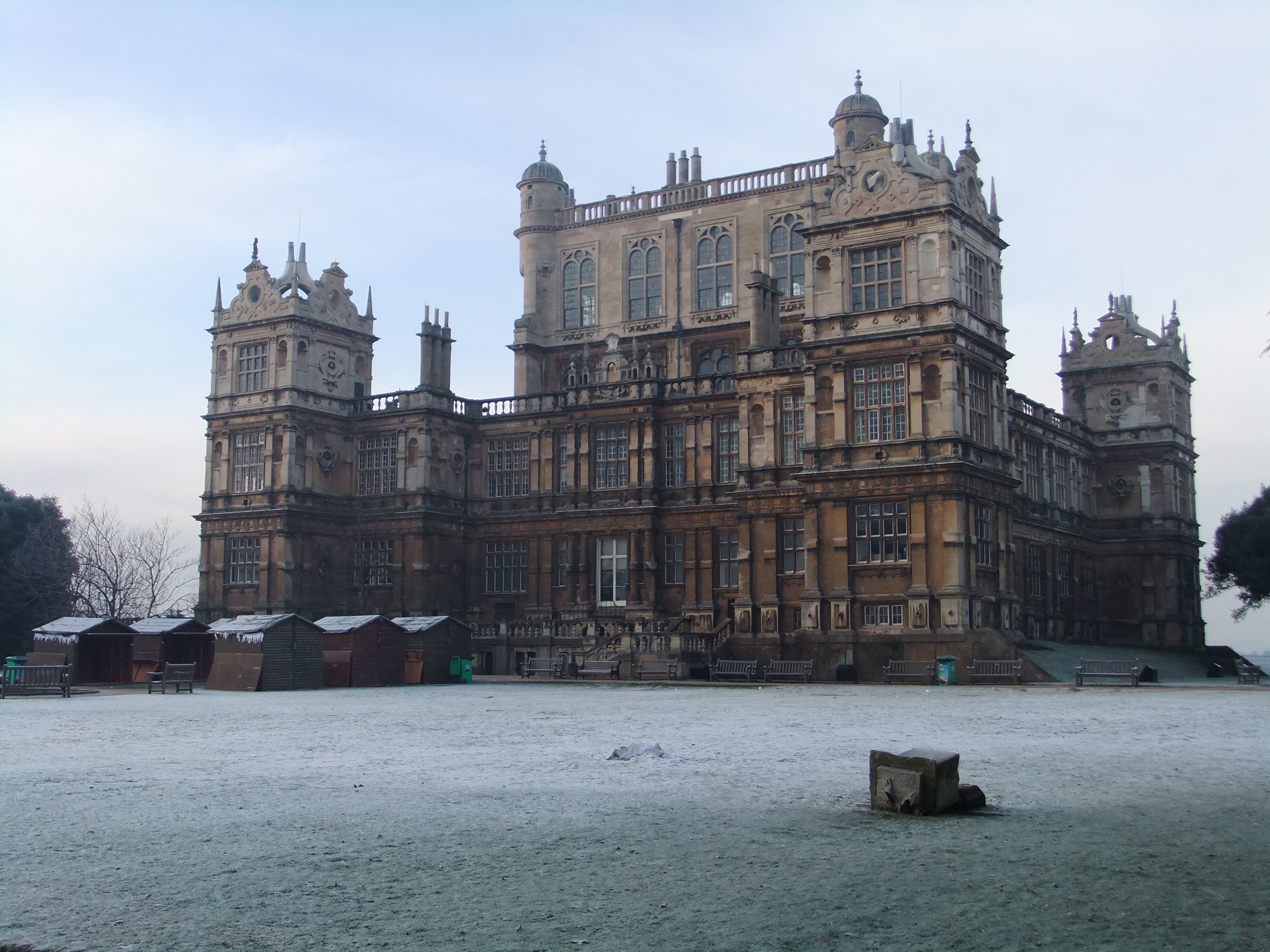
Wollaton Hall, in Nottingham, property of the Willoughbys, in-laws through Knight Simon Weston

David Yale married to Frances Lloyd, daughter of Admiralty Judge John Lloyd, member of the Griffiths of Cevn Amwlch, who rose to power following the struggles of the Wynns of Gwydir. Lloyd also cofounded the 1st protestant college at Oxford University with Queen Elizabeth named Jesus College. David's brother-in-law was Knight Simon Weston, a family member of the Willoughbys of Wollaton Hall.

David's niece, Countess Elizabeth Weston, was the sister-in-law of Sir Percival Willoughby's son, and aunt of Francis Willughby, father of Cassandra, Duchess of Chandos. She was of the family of Jane Austen, author of Pride and Prejudice, through her husband James Brydges, the 1st Duke.

David's uncles were Dr. Griffith Lloyd, Dr. Thomas Yale, Chancellor of the head of the church of England and Ambassador to Queen Elizabeth Tudor, Hugh Yale, Alderman of Oswestry, and Roger Lloyd, Secretary to Cardinal Thomas Wolsey, King Henry VIII's chief minister.

His aunt Katherine was a daughter of the Lord of Cymmer-yn-Edeirnion, William ap Griffith Vychan, and another family member, also named David Yale, had been Dean of Bangor Cathedral in 1502. Through his other aunt Jane, wife of Edward Trevor, Yale was the cousin of Sir Edward Trevor of Brynkinalt Hall, Marcus Trevor, 1st Viscount Dungannon, and Sir John Trevor. One of Yale's nephews, John Yale, was the Constable of Chirk for Sir Thomas Myddelton of Chirk Castle, and also served his kinsman Sir Edward Trevor.

His great-nephew, Thomas Yale, married Dorothy Hughes, daughter of Humphrey Hughes of the Hughes of Gwerclas, 14th Baron of Cymmer-yn-Edeirnion, and their daughter, Dorothy Yale, married the 16th Baron. Through this line, the Plas-yn-Yale estate would be inherited through multiple successions by Rev. John Yale, a Rector from Cambridge University, and descendant of the Bostocks of Bostock Hall.

=== American colonies ===
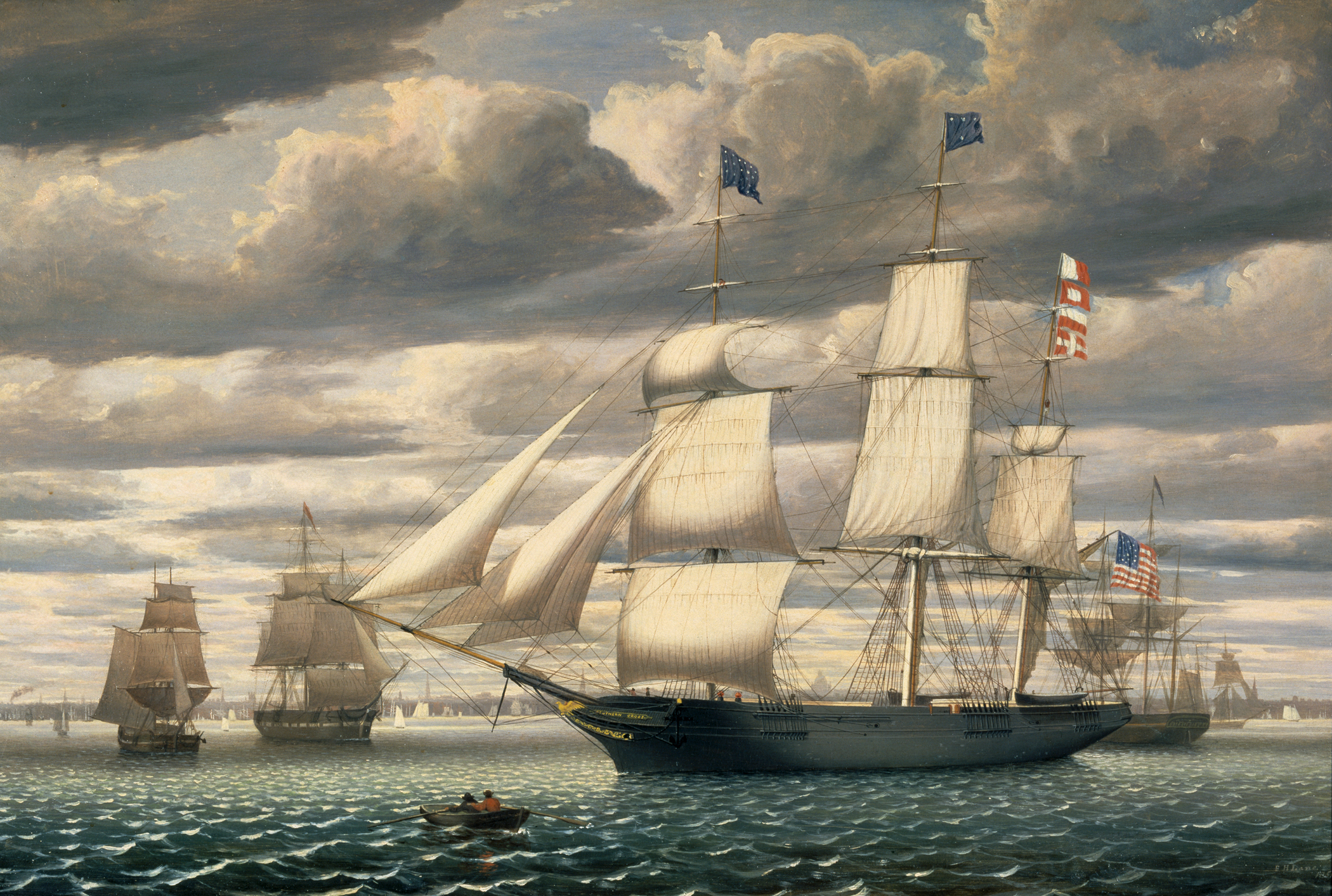
The Eaton/Yale family arrived in the New England Colonies in 1637, on the ship "Hector", departure from London

David's son, London merchant Thomas Yale II, married the daughter of Bishop George Lloyd of Chester, and after his death and her remarriage to Gov. Theophilus Eaton, she and her children emigrated to America as a reconstituted family. Eaton was at the time the English Ambassador to Danemark and Deputy Governor of the Eastland Company, representing King James I of England. Anne Lloyd's son, Capt. Thomas Yale, became one of the founders of New Haven Colony with his father-in-law, and another son, David Yale, became a wealthy merchant in Boston, attorney to Robert Rich, 2nd Earl of Warwick, and the father of Gov. Elihu Yale, benefactor of Yale College.

David Yale also became second sergeant of the Artillery Company in 1648, and acquired the past home of Governor John Endecott, consisting of two acres of land with a garden, from merchant Edward Bendall, and was located in Scollay Square, downtown Boston. Yale's estate was later sold by his attorney Capt. Thomas Lake, brother of Sir Edward Lake, 1st Baronet, and son-in-law of Deputy Governor Stephen Goodyear of the Goodyear family.

He later left Massachusetts Bay Colony for London with his brother-in-law, Gov. Edward Hopkins, a Lord of the Admiralty under Cromwell and nephew of Sir Henry Lello, English Ambassador to the Ottoman Empire for Queen Elizabeth Tudor and keeper of the Palace of Westminster. In London, David Yale became proprietor of a counting house (merchant bank), and helped his sons join the East India Company, ending with Elihu Yale eventually becoming President of Madras, and his brother, Thomas Yale, becoming Ambassador to the King of Siam.
