= Three Old Arches =

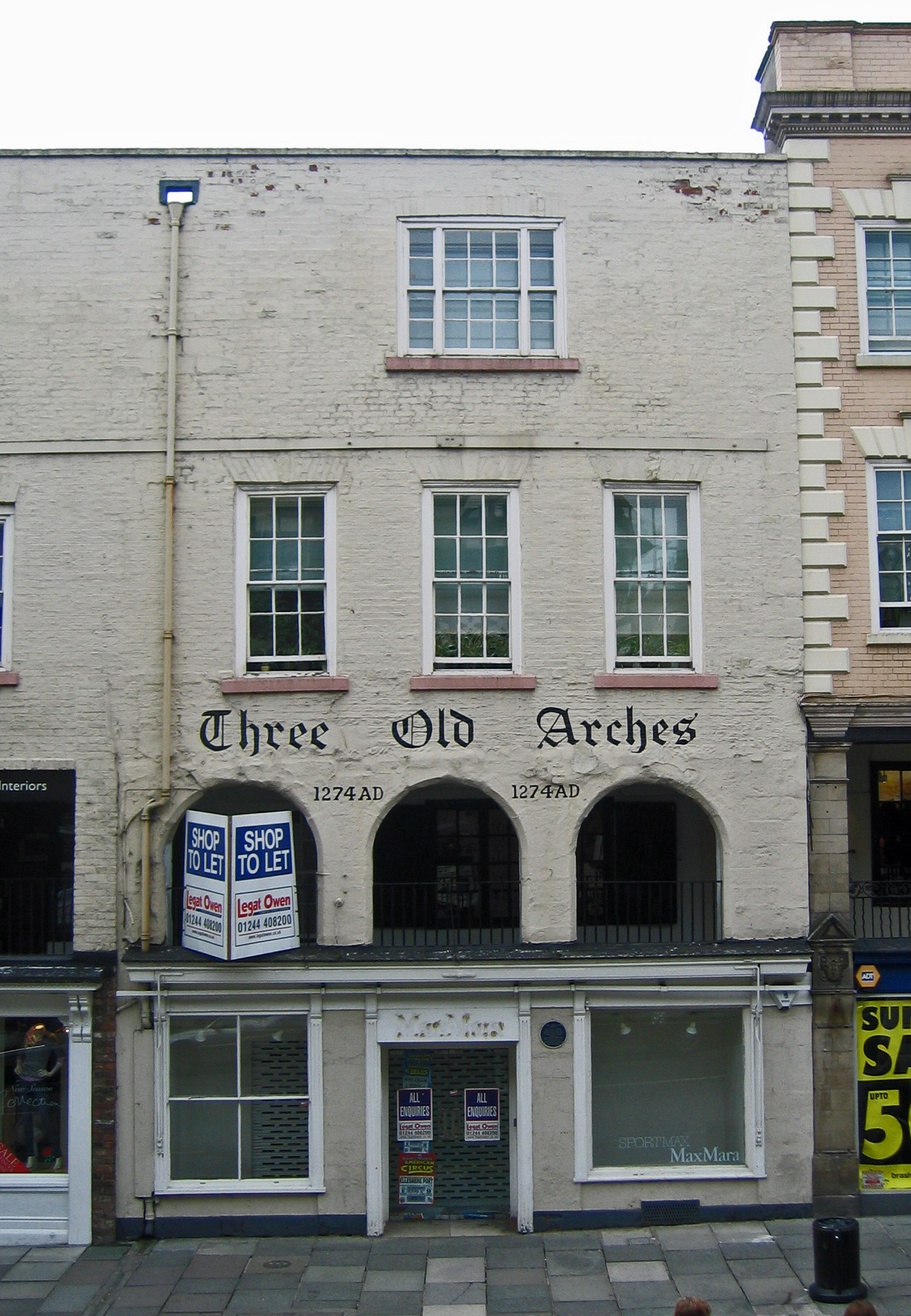
- Three Old Arches

- Location in Cheshire
- 53.1889°N 2.8913°W
- Location: 48 Bridge Street, Chester, Cheshire, England
- OS grid reference: SJ 405 661

History
- Built: 13th century

Listed Building – Grade I
- Official name: Nos.48 & 50 Street and Nos.48, 50 & 52 Row (Three Old Arches)
- Designated: 10 January 1972
- Reference no.: 1376095

Three Old Arches is a building at 48 Bridge Street, Chester, Cheshire, England. Together with the adjacent building at No. 50, it is recorded in the National Heritage List for England as a designated Grade I listed building. The buildings incorporate part of the Chester Rows. The stone frontage at the street and row levels of No. 48 is considered to be the earliest shop front still surviving in England. It was once the largest-known medieval town house in the Chester Rows, and the stone-walled hall at the row level extending to No. 50 was the largest hall set parallel to the rows in Chester.

== History ==
The building was constructed in the 13th century. During the 14th century it was extended to the south (into what is now No. 50), when the hall, set parallel to the rows, was built. During the 20th century part of the building was used by William Jones, a grocer. In the 1960s the business was taken over by the department store of Owen Owen, but this closed in 1999. The ground floor continues to be used as a shop.

== Architecture ==
=== Exterior ===
At the level of the row are three round-headed chamfered arches, the piers of which pass down to the ground level, at the sides of the windows and entrance of the shop at this level. Above the arches, in Gothic script, is the inscription "Three Old Arches". Duplicated at the tops of the piers, between the arches, is the date "1274 AD". Above the arches are three sash windows, each with 12 panes and, in the top storey is another sash window, this one being tripartite, with 4:12:4 panes.

=== Interior ===
In the undercroft of No. 48, the original stone pillars have been replaced by cast-iron columns. The undercroft of No. 50 retains its original stone arch. Much of the medieval stone hall remains at the level of the row, which extends between Nos. 48 and 50. It is the largest stone-walled hall set parallel with the row in Chester, measuring over 12m by over 8m, and it contains four medieval doorways. The hall also contains a 16th-century open fireplace with a 19th-century cast-iron range.

== See also ==
- Grade I listed buildings in Cheshire West and Chester
