= Bishop Lloyd's House =

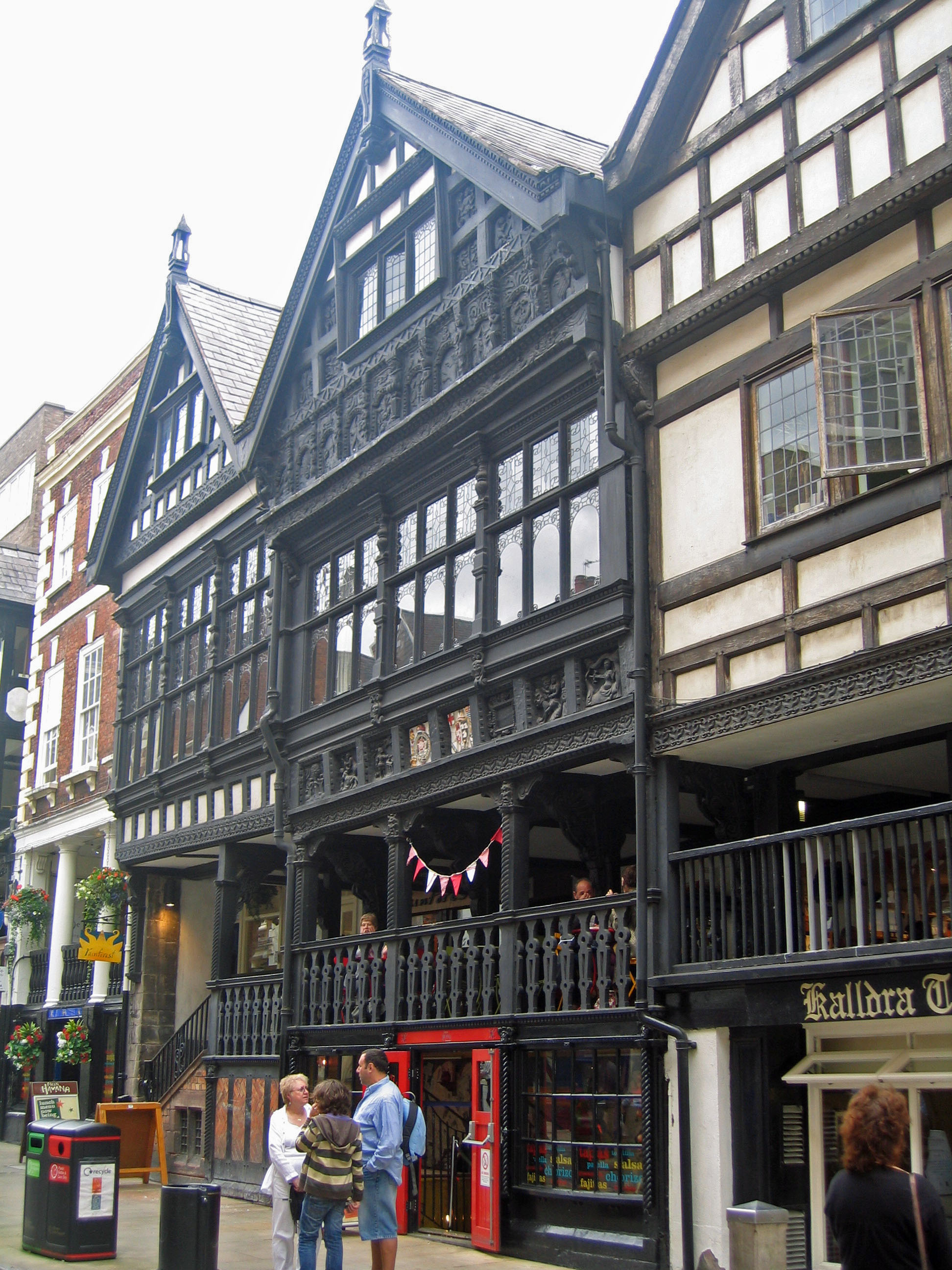
- Bishop Lloyd's House in 2009

- Location within Cheshire
- 53.1899°N 2.8934°W
- Location: 41 Watergate Street, and 51/53 Watergate Row, Chester, Cheshire, England
- OS grid reference: SJ 404 662

History
- Built: 13th–14th century
- Rebuilt: 17th century

Site notes
- Restored: 1890s, 1973–77
- Restored by: Thomas Lockwood (1890s)
- Governing body: Chester Civic Trust

Listed Building – Grade I
- Official name: No.41 Street and Nos.51 & 53 Row (Bishop Lloyd's House)
- Designated: 28 August 1955

Bishop Lloyd's House (or Bishop Lloyd's Palace) is at 41 Watergate Street, and 51/53 Watergate Row, Chester, Cheshire, England. It is recorded in the National Heritage List for England as a designated Grade I listed building. The architectural historian Nikolaus Pevsner considered it to be "perhaps the best" house in Chester.

The house is built on two stone medieval undercrofts with timber framing above. Its first floor incorporates a section of the Chester Rows. The house is now used as shops and meeting rooms and it includes the headquarters of Chester Civic Trust.

== History ==
The house originated as two town houses which were built on medieval undercrofts. It was rebuilt during the 17th century when the two buildings were converted into one. The rebuilt house broke with the medieval fashion of having the main residential accommodation in a great hall at the row level; instead the principal living accommodation was in two "elegant chambers" in the floor above the row. The house has been associated with George Lloyd, who was Bishop of Chester from 1605 to 1615, and his daughter Ann, who married Thomas Yale, son of the Chancellor of Chester David Yale, members of the Yale family of Yale University. In the early 18th century the east (left) house bore a panel inscribed "EDGAR'S ACADEMY". By the 19th century it had become run down, the carvings on its frontage had been covered with plaster, the house had been split into tenements, and it was becoming derelict. In the 1890s the house was heavily restored by Thomas Lockwood. He re-fronted the east house to more closely match the west house and added a flight of steps from the street to the level of the row on the east side. He also re-positioned the posts holding the structure above the row and replaced the 18th-century sash windows with mullioned windows. A further restoration was carried out between 1973 and 1977.

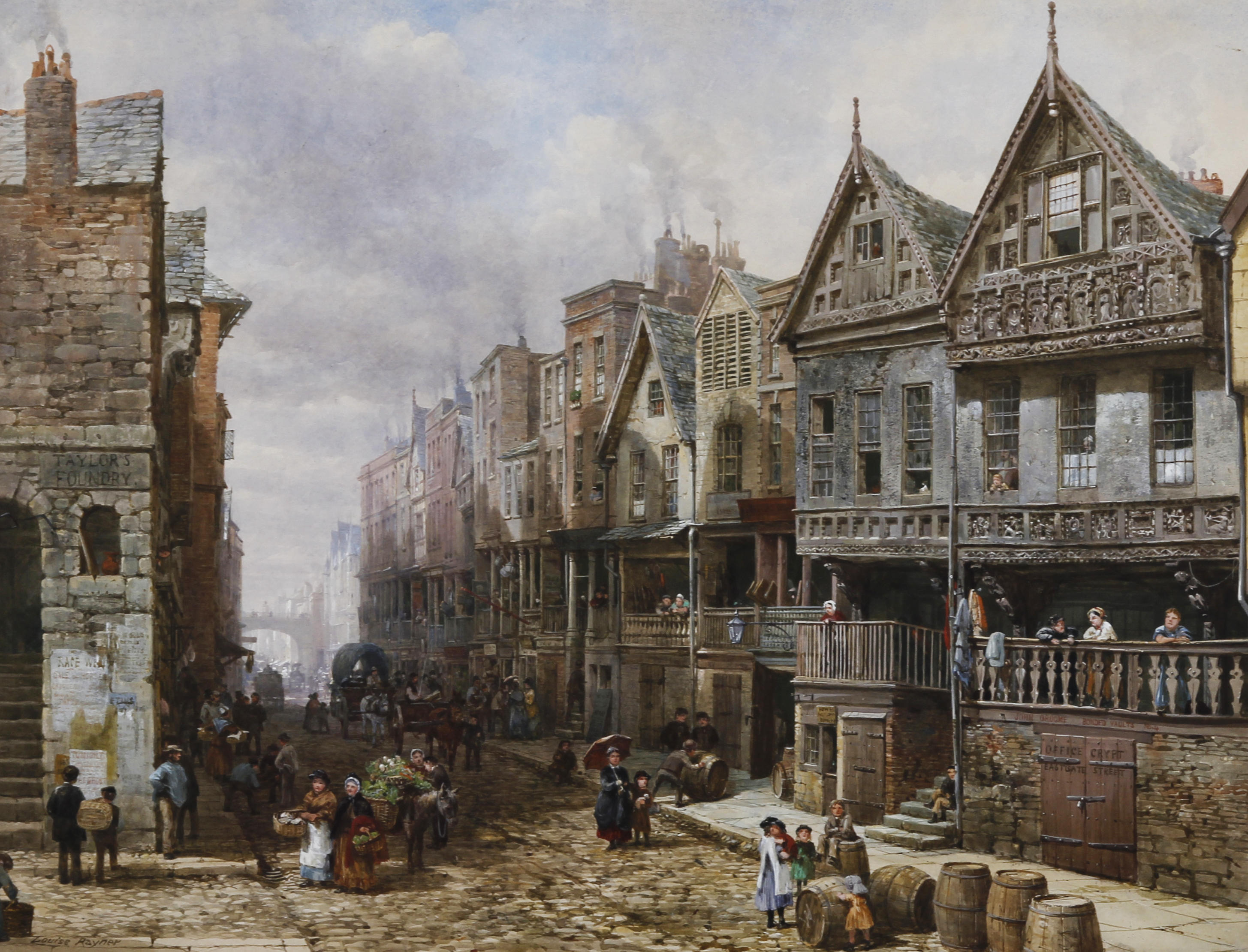
Bishop Lloyd's House on the right, before Lockwood's restoration

== Architecture ==
=== Exterior ===
The building has the appearance of two houses, each under a gable, with three storeys, and an attic in each gable. At the street level the east (left) house has a stone staircase with a wrought iron railing. At the row level is an oak handrail on balusters, behind which is a shop front. The brackets supporting the storey above are carved with bearded giants, beasts and an owl; there are also lighter brackets shaped as figures. On the outside, between the beam over the row and the windows above are ten square panels. The windows are divided into three bays by oak pilasters carved in Jacobean style, and further divided in each bay by two mullions and two transoms making a total of 27. Above the windows is a plaster band and in the attic is a three-light window surrounded by more square panels. The bargeboards have carved cornices with an ornate post between them.

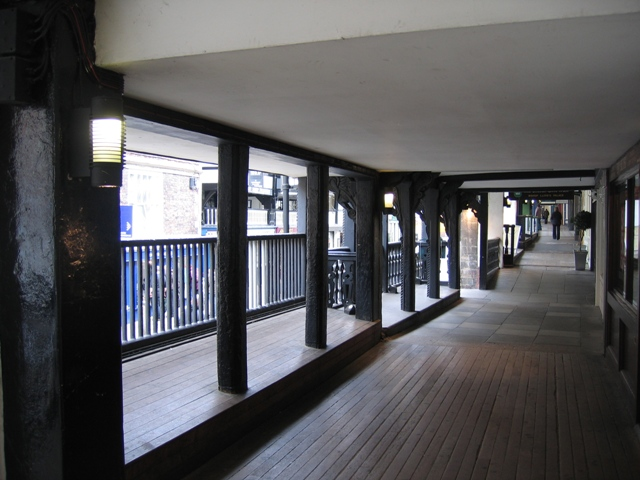
Row in front of Bishop Lloyd's House in 2008 showing the walkway and stallboard

The ground floor of the west house includes a shop with a central entrance. On each side are two piers and an 18-light bow window. At the row level is a wooden balustrade, and brackets with carvings similar to the east house. Above this level are eight recessed carved panels. The two centre panels contain the coat of arms of James I with an inscription, and the arms of Sodor and Man (George Lloyd was Bishop of Sodor and Man before he became Bishop of Chester) with the date 1615. To the left of these are three panels containing carvings of Adam and Eve, Cain and Abel, and Abraham and Isaac. To the right are another three panels, two of which contain carvings of biblical scenes. In the storey above are four oak pilasters dividing the windows into three bays, with two mullions and a transom further separating the windows - of which there is a total of 18. Above the windows is a carved beam and over this are ten arched panels which contain carvings of heraldic beasts. In the attic is a three-light window to each side of which are three panels containing carvings, and above the window are three plain panels. Again the bargeboards are carved with a post between them.

=== Interior ===
The two undercrofts have walls of red sandstone rubble, with brick barrel vaults which were probably added in the 18th century. Leading from the row level to the third storey is a Chinese Chippendale staircase. In the third storey are two rooms. The larger room has an ornate 17th-century plaster ceiling and a massive fireplace; it is thought that these were moved from the Bishop's Palace in Abbey Square after this was damaged in the Civil War. The smaller room also has a plaster ceiling, less ornate than in the other room. This includes motifs including Tudor roses, horses, and starfish. Around the room is a frieze containing sea-monsters. In this room is a smaller fireplace in the overmantel of which is a carving of Cupid riding on a lion.

== Today ==
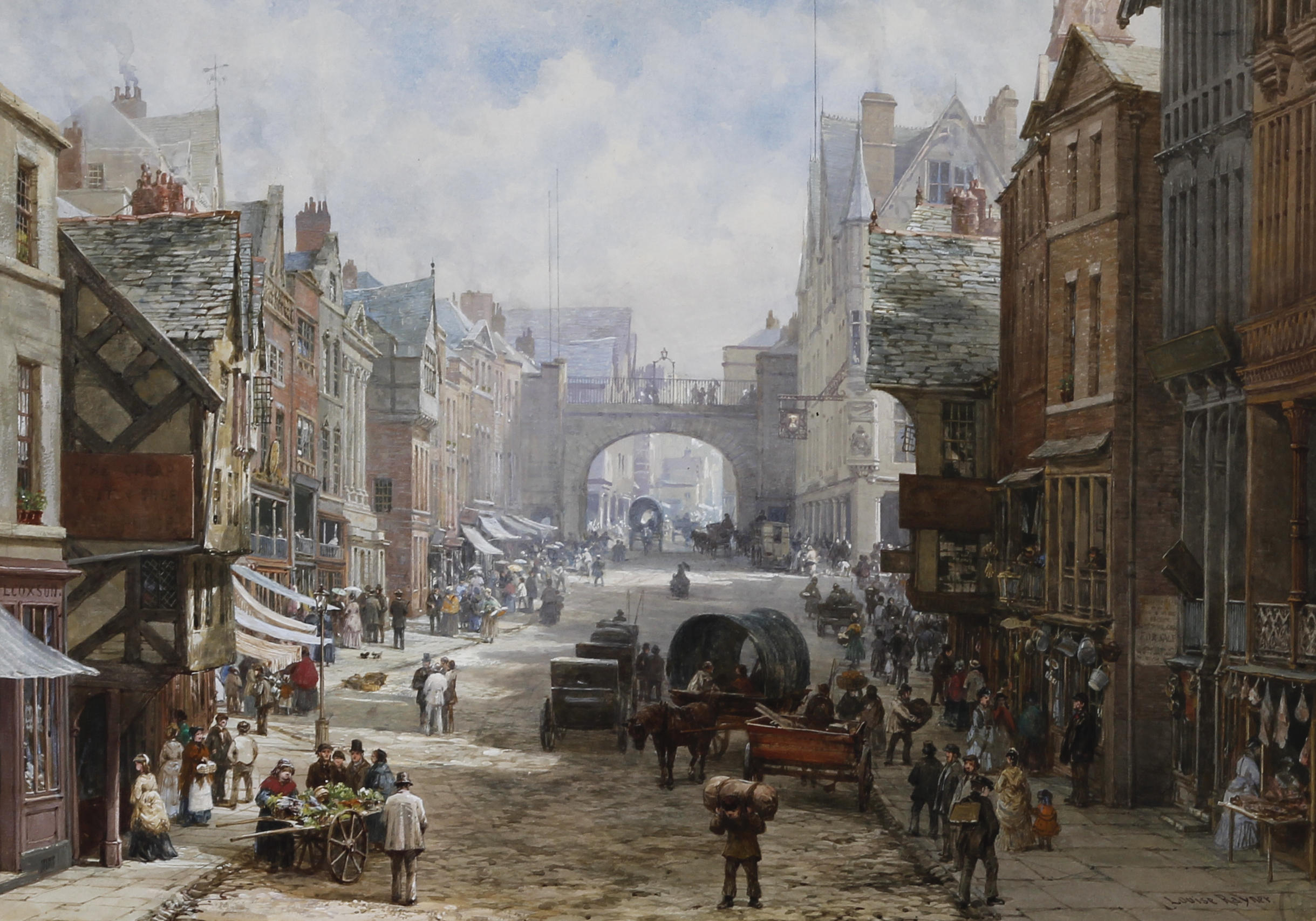
City of Chester

There are shops on the ground floor level and at the level of the row. The house above is open free of charge to visitors at advertised times. It has two large meeting rooms which are available to hire. The building contains the headquarters of the Chester Civic Trust.

== See also ==
- Grade I listed buildings in Cheshire West and Chester
