= Bishopscourt, Isle of Man =

Coordinates: 54°17′59″N 4°34′15″W

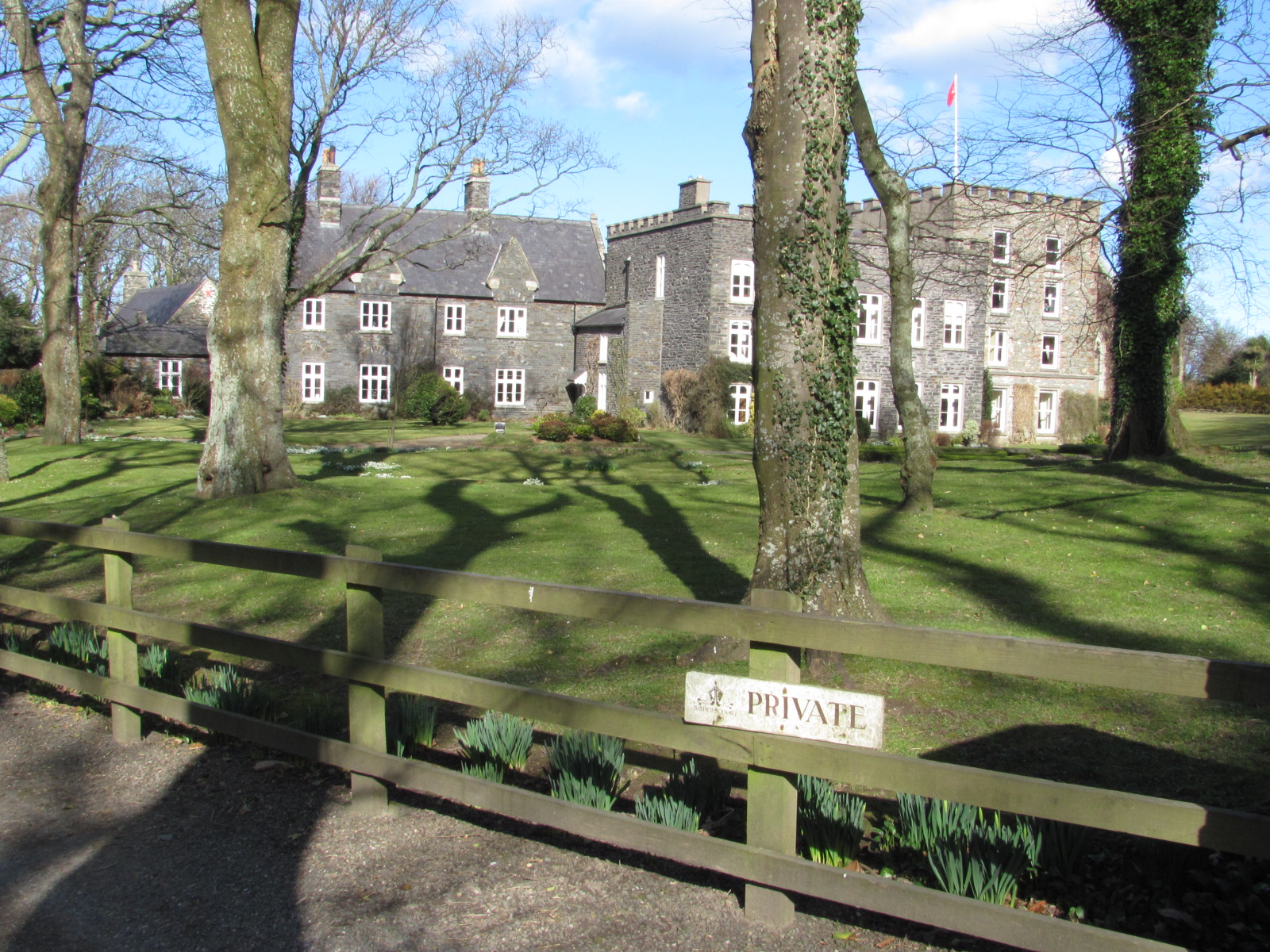
Bishopcourt House on the A3 Castletown to Ramsey Road, Isle of Man

Bishopscourt (previously known as Ballacurry, in Manx: the farm of McCurry or O'Curry) consists of a 17th-century mansion house, the St Nicholas (Private Chapel) in the Church of England Diocese of Sodor and Man, and the former estate of Ballachurry or Bishopscourt Manse.

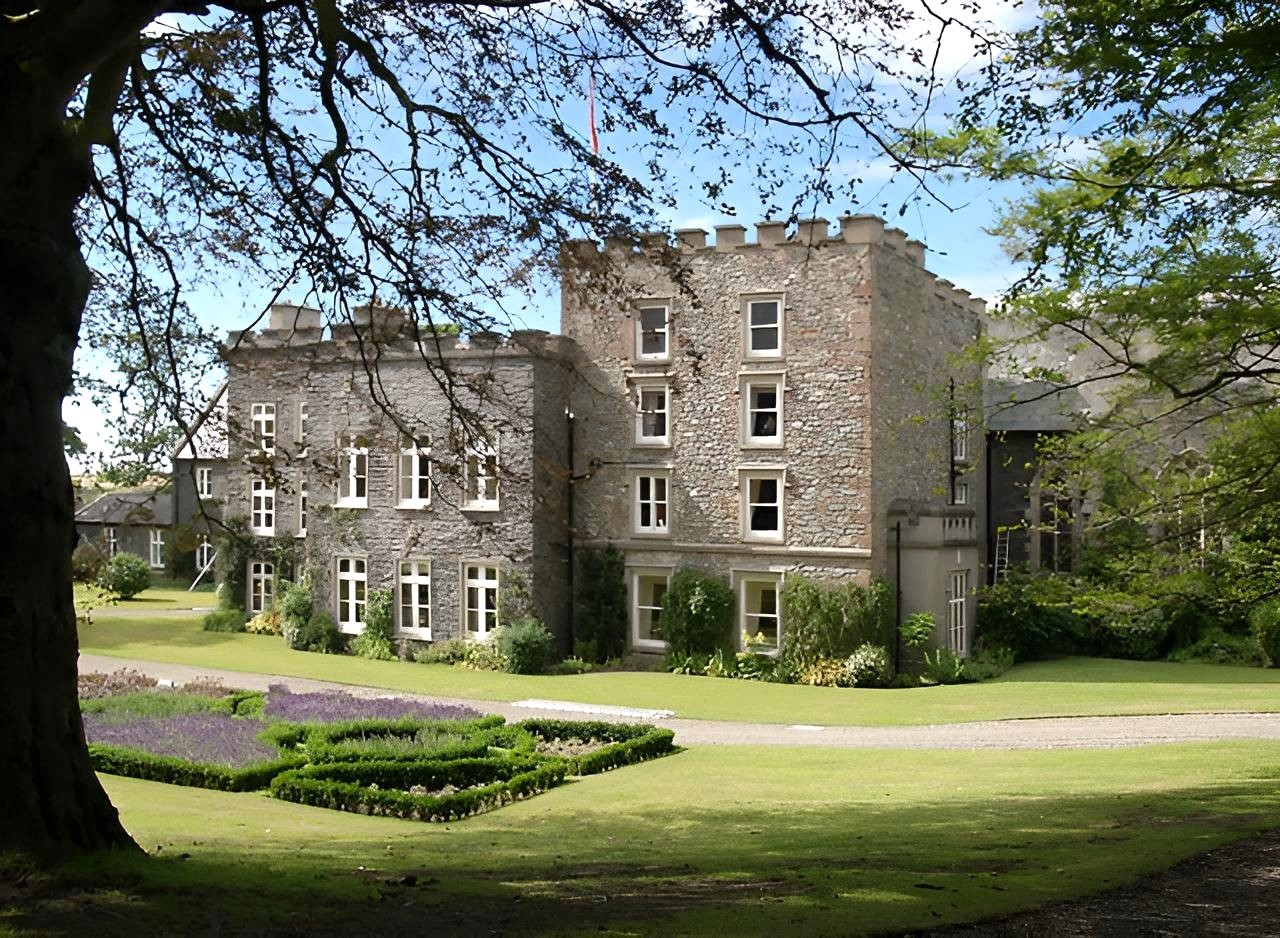
Palace's church on the right

== History ==
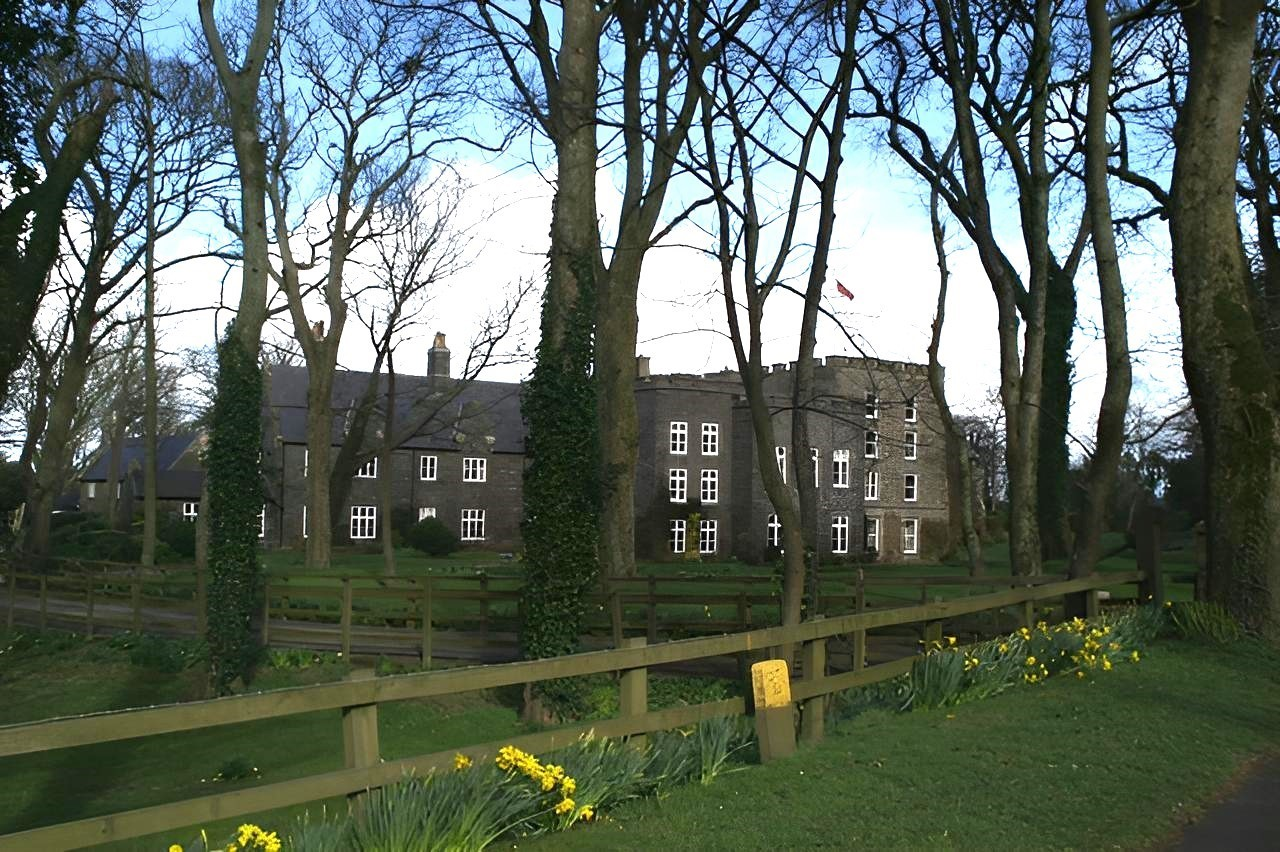
Bishopscourt, rear view

Previously the official residence of the Bishop of Sodor and Man, the current Bishopscourt House and estate are now in private ownership.

Bishopscourt is situated north of Kirk Michael on the primary A3 Castletown to Ramsey road and is known as a historic point in the TT races, adjacent to the 16th Milestone road-side marker of the Snaefell Mountain Course close to the tertiary C19 Orrisdale Loop Road junction.

The Bishopscourt Manse and the Bishop's Glen form part of the boundary of the parishes of Michael and Ballaugh. The bishop's Chapel of St Nicholas was the diocese's pro-cathedral from 1895 until the estate's sale in 1976. One of its former residents was Bishop George Lloyd, whose daughter married the son of Chancellor David Yale.

From 1643 to 1651, the 7th Earl of Derby, Lord of Mann and the grandson of the 17th Earl of Oxford, used the palace as his summer estate while the see was vacant. During the English Civil War under Cromwell, Commander-in-Chief Thomas Fairfax, 3rd Lord Fairfax of Cameron, appointed James Chaloner as Governor of the Isle of Man, and he used the palace as his primary residence.

The palace is over 700 years old and was sold around 2020 for about 6 million pounds.

== Description ==
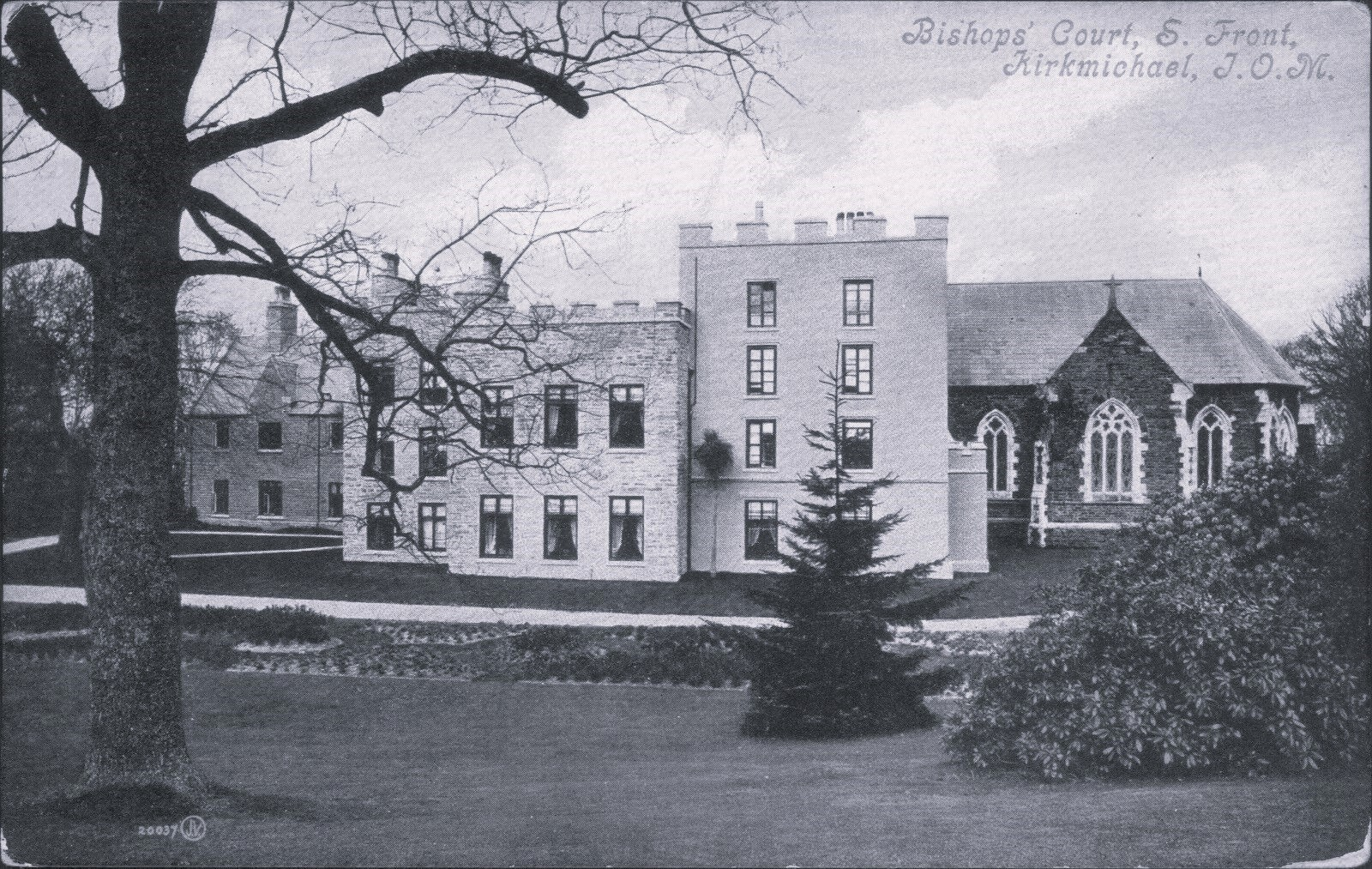
Bishopscourt postcard, 1920

The current residence dates from the 17th century; the former moated King Orry's Tower and previous timbered residence was rebuilt by Bishop Thomas Wilson from 1698 after finding the 'house in ruins nothing but a sentient tower and chapel remaining entire'.

Bishop Wilson rebuilt in the present castellated baronial style, and it was enlarged by Bishop Claudius Crigan from 1784 onwards. The King Orry's Tower was repaired and restored by Bishop Crigan in preparation 'to reside at Bishopscourt, to repair and even rebuild the ruins of which as all was ruins has cost a very severe expense'.

The chapel dating from 1651 adjacent to King Orry's Tower was demolished around 1815 and replaced by a Georgian Chapel on the same site, which itself was replaced by a Victorian Gothic Chapel of St. Nicholas on a slightly different site by Bishop Horatio Powys.

Further renovation occurred after a fire in 1893 destroyed the hall section of Bishopscourt house. A tree was planted in the garden by King George V in 1920 during a visit.
