= Gwyddelwern =

Village in Denbighshire, Wales

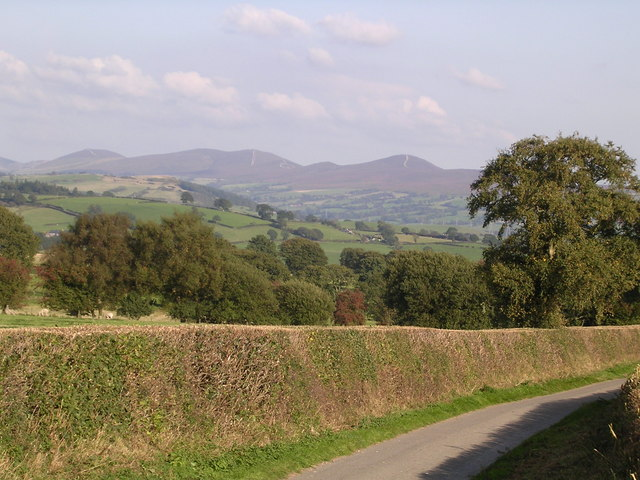
- Gwyddelwern, Denbighshire, Wales

- Location within Denbighshire
- Population: 500 (2011)
- OS grid reference: SJ075465
- Community: Gwyddelwern
- Principal area: Denbighshire
- Preserved county: Clwyd
- Country: Wales
- Sovereign state: United Kingdom
- Post town: CORWEN
- Postcode district: LL21
- Dialling code: 01490
- Police: North Wales
- Fire: North Wales
- Ambulance: Welsh
- UK Parliament: Clwyd West
- Senedd Cymru – Welsh Parliament: Clwyd West
- List of places UK Wales Denbighshire 53.009°N 3.379°W Map of the community

Gwyddelwern is a small village and community of 508 residents, reducing to 500 at the 2011 census, situated approximately 2 miles (3.2 km) north of Corwen in Denbighshire in Wales. Historically the village was part of the Edeyrnion district of Meirionnydd. Edeyrnion was part of the Glyndŵr district of Clwyd from 1974 to 1996, when the area became part of the principal area of Denbighshire. The village straddles the A494 road (trunk road).

== Etymology ==
The name is often "poetically", but incorrectly, translated as The Irishman's Alder Grove. Gwyddel being Irishman, wern usually referring to a damp or swampy area arising from run-off from surrounding hills. However, the name is derived from gwyddeli, meaning thickets, hence the correct translation would be alder marsh in the thickets. In colloquial speech the village is often referred to simply as Gwyddel.

== Geography ==
The outlook to the west of the village is dominated by the hills Mynydd-Rhŷd-Ddu and Bryn Gwenallt. To the south the view extends over the Dee Valley to the Berwyn Mountains and Arenig Fawr near Bala.

Besides farm work, local employers include a saw mill in the village and light manufacturing in Corwen and Cynwyd, further south.

== History ==
Shield of the Lord of Gwyddelwern

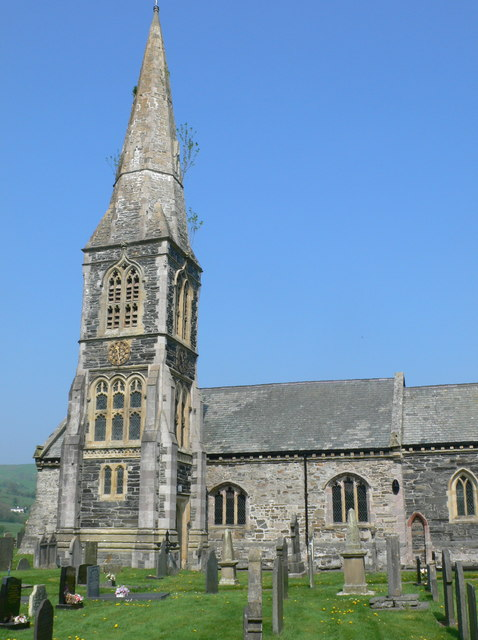
St Beuno's Church, Gwyddelwern

The nearby hamlet of Bryn Saith Marchog (53°02′25″N 03°22′45″W), features in the story of Branwen, daughter of Llyr, part of the Mabinogion, and is so named after Bendigeidfran (Bran the Blessed), who stationed seven princes or knights there (the Saith Marchog) to watch over his lands while he was away in Ireland.

The Lordship of Gwyddelwern was a junior title within the Princely House of Powys Fadog and was recorded in 1400 as being held by Tudur ap Gruffudd, son of Gruffydd Fychan II, who was the younger brother of Prince Owain Glyndŵr.

Tudur perished in battle during Glyndŵr's war of independence and the title became dormant. His grandson, Ellis ap Griffith, husband of Margaret, the heiress of Plas yn Yale, would later succeed Tudur to the Lordship of Gwyddelwern and become Baron of Gwyddelwern.

In 1550, Gwyddelwern absorbed the neighboring parish of Llanaelhaiarn (named after its founder and patron saint Aelhaiarn, who visited the region in the early 7th century with his master Saint Beuno); a small village at the site was long also known as Aelhaiarn but was eventually replaced by the small community of Pandy'r Capel.

During the English Civil War a significant part of the village sided with the Royalist Cause - or at least enough people for the village to be required to give financial retribution. At the end of 1649 at least 20 men from the village were fined by the Parliamentarian side for "delinquency" to pay for their involvement fighting for the king. This included a heavy fine of £28 for Peter Meyrick at Ucheldref Farm.

Quarrying was important to Gwyddelwern: the two local quarries being the Dee Clwyd Granite Quarry and Graig Lelo Quarry. There is still activity at Graig Lelo, which plays host to a vehicle breakers and a granite and marble finishing business.

=== The Coming and Going of the Railways ===
Gwyddelwern became the first full-operational railway station in the Vale of Edeyrnion, when services started on 22 September 22, 1864 with the opening of the Denbigh, Ruthin and Corwen Railway. The station generated much income from the two quarries, which both had their own sidings. The station also had a coal yard, horse loading bay and cattle pens with a weighing machine. There was a freight loop at Gwyddelwern, on the otherwise single track line.

Passenger services ended on 2 February 1953 and goods traffic on 2 December 1957.

=== Architecture ===
Gwyddelwern's historic architecture includes the much-rebuilt high spire of the parish church of St Beuno. The churchyard is circular, an indication of the age of the site, possibly to pre Christian times.

Which shares a boundary with the local inn - Tŷ Mawr, formerly the Rose and Crown. Parts of Tŷ Mawr date back to the 11th century and, during extensive renovation, a rare jeton or 15th century gaming token was found in one of the wall spaces.
