= George Lloyd (bishop of Chester) =

Bishop of Chester

The Right Reverend George Lloyd DD
- Bishop of Chester
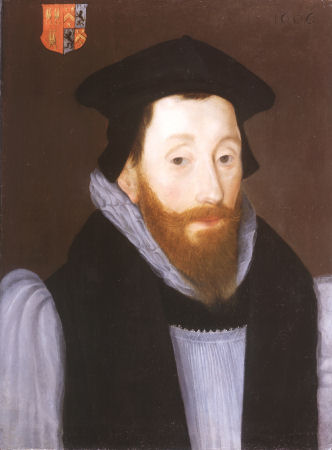
- Installed: 1605
- Term ended: 1615
- Predecessor: Richard Vaughan
- Successor: Thomas Morton
- Other posts: Bishop of Sodor and Man (1600–1605)

Personal details
- Born: 1560
- Died: 1615 (aged 54–55)
- Denomination: Anglican
- Spouse: Anne Wilkenson (1594–1615)
- Education: King's School, Chester; Jesus College, Cambridge

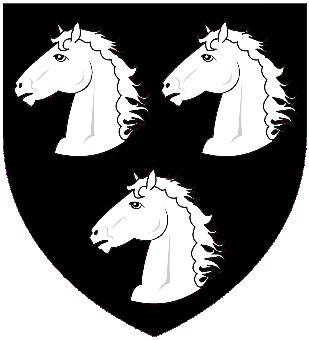
Arms: Sable three horses' heads couped Argent.

George Lloyd (1560– 1 August 1615) was born in Wales, and became Bishop of Sodor and Man, then Bishop of Chester. He is remembered for Bishop Lloyd's House in Chester, which he had built in the years before his death, and which is recorded in the National Heritage List for England as a designated Grade I listed building.

== Family and education ==
Lloyd was born in 1560 at Bryn Euryn, Llandrillo yn Rhos in Wales. His father was Meredith Lloyd of Llanelian-yn-Rhos, Denbighshire, and his mother Jonet Conwy.

He was educated at the King's School, Chester from 1575-1579. He then entered Jesus College, Cambridge. There he received his B.A. in 1583, M.A. in 1586, B.D. in 1593, and finally his Doctor of Divinity in 1598.

He married Anne Wilkenson in 1594 and they had six children who lived to adulthood.

His daughter Anne married the son of Chancellor David Yale, Thomas Yale, whose son David was father of Elihu Yale, benefactor of the college now named for him. David's brother was Capt. Thomas Yale.

Anne married secondly Theophilus Eaton, merchant, diplomat, and, later, one of the founders and the first governor of the New Haven Colony. The Eatons emigrated to New England in 1637, aboard the Hector of London, along with the Yale family.

== Ministry ==
Lloyd became a Fellow of Magdalene College, Cambridge around 1586. He was ordained as a curate for the church of St Peter Mancroft in Norwich by Bishop Edmund Scrambler of Norwich in January 1591.

He was rector of Llanrwst, and later that same year, rector of Heswall, Cheshire from 1597.

=== Bishop of Sodor and Man ===
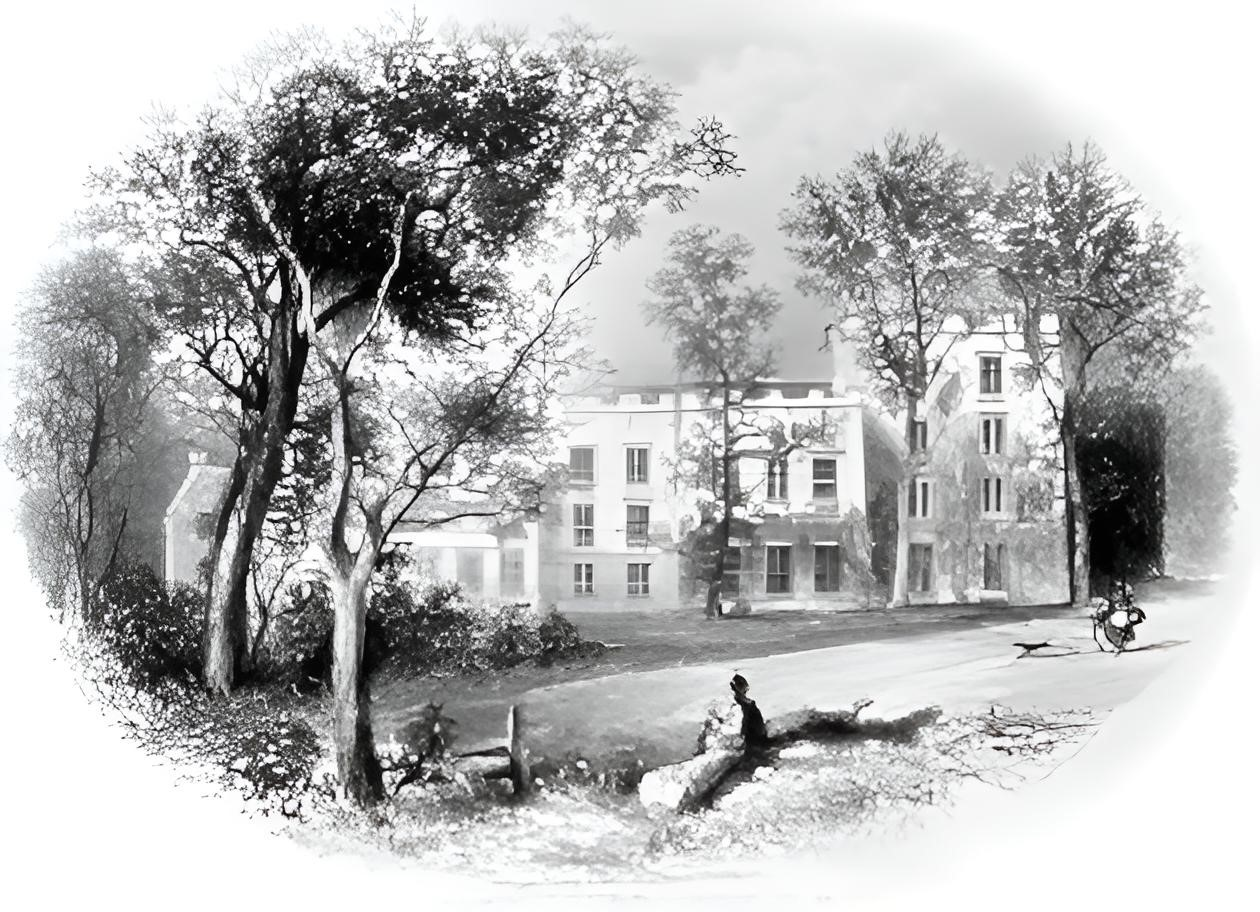
Bishopscourt, Isle of Man

He was consecrated as Bishop of Sodor and Man in 1600. Although this bishopric was not a lucrative one, and he even commented on the "smallness of the Bishopricke". Despite this, the appointment was a significant promotion and stepping stone to a more prominent position in England.

Like most of his predecessors, Lloyd rarely visited the Isle of Man and there is only one recorded visit in 1603 where he attended a Consistory Court where several offenders against the spiritual law were punished.

Although Lloyd did have a bishop's palace on the Isle of Man, some twenty miles north of the cathedral at Peel, he significantly refurbished a fashionable townhouse at Watergate Street in Chester, part of Chester Rows.

=== Bishop of Chester ===
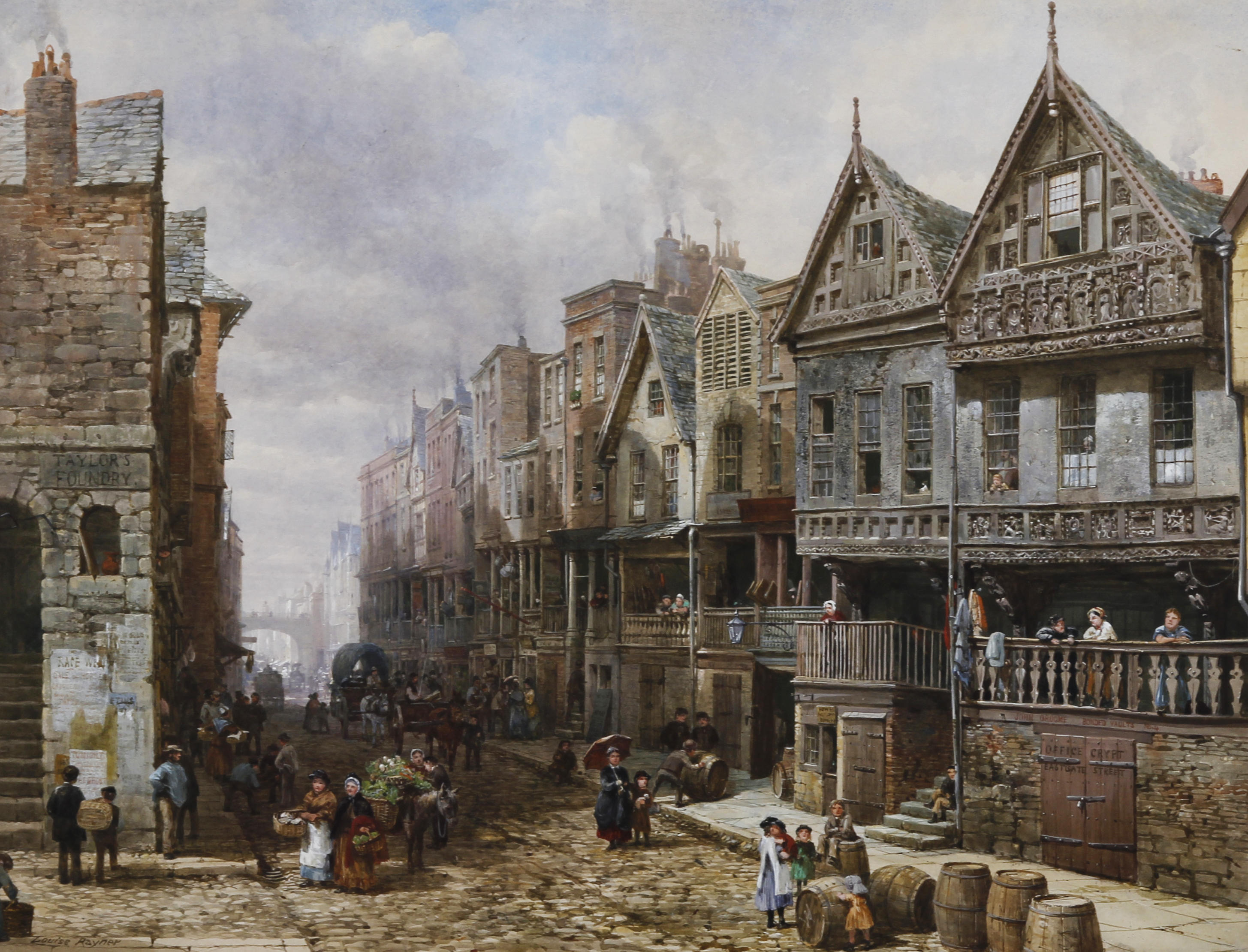
Bishop Lloyd's House, in the city of Chester, England

In 1605 he exchanged the seat of Sodor and Man for that of Chester, the Chester Cathedral and was consecrated in January. A former lecturer at Chester Cathedral, he was tolerant of Puritan views in his diocese.

During his tenure as Bishop of Chester, he reversed the anti-Puritan policies of his predecessor Richard Vaughan, who was Bishop of London. His successor as Bishop of Chester was Thomas Morton, who had residence at Durham Castle as Prince-Bishop of Durham, and later at Belvoir Castle under Roger Manners, 5th Earl of Rutland.

In local politics, he opposed Robert Whitby, a nominee of Lord Ellesmere, the Lord Chancellor, as clerk of the Pentice, who was building a family factional position in the city. His residence in Chester was at Bishop Lloyd's House.

He died 1 August 1615, and was buried in Chester cathedral, where he is commemorated by a mural inscription. In the year of his death he bought Pant Iocyn, near Wrexham, formerly the residence of the Almer family, which remained the home of his family till 1634.

The estate was from the Almers who married with the son of Sir William Gerard, a cousin of Sir Gilbert Gerard.

== Notes ==
Church of England titles
Preceded by John Meyrick	Bishop of Sodor and Man; 1600–1605	Succeeded by John Philips
Preceded by Richard Vaughan	Bishop of Chester; 1605–1615	Succeeded by Thomas Morton
