= The Falcon, Chester =

Grade I listed pub in Cheshire, England

The Falcon
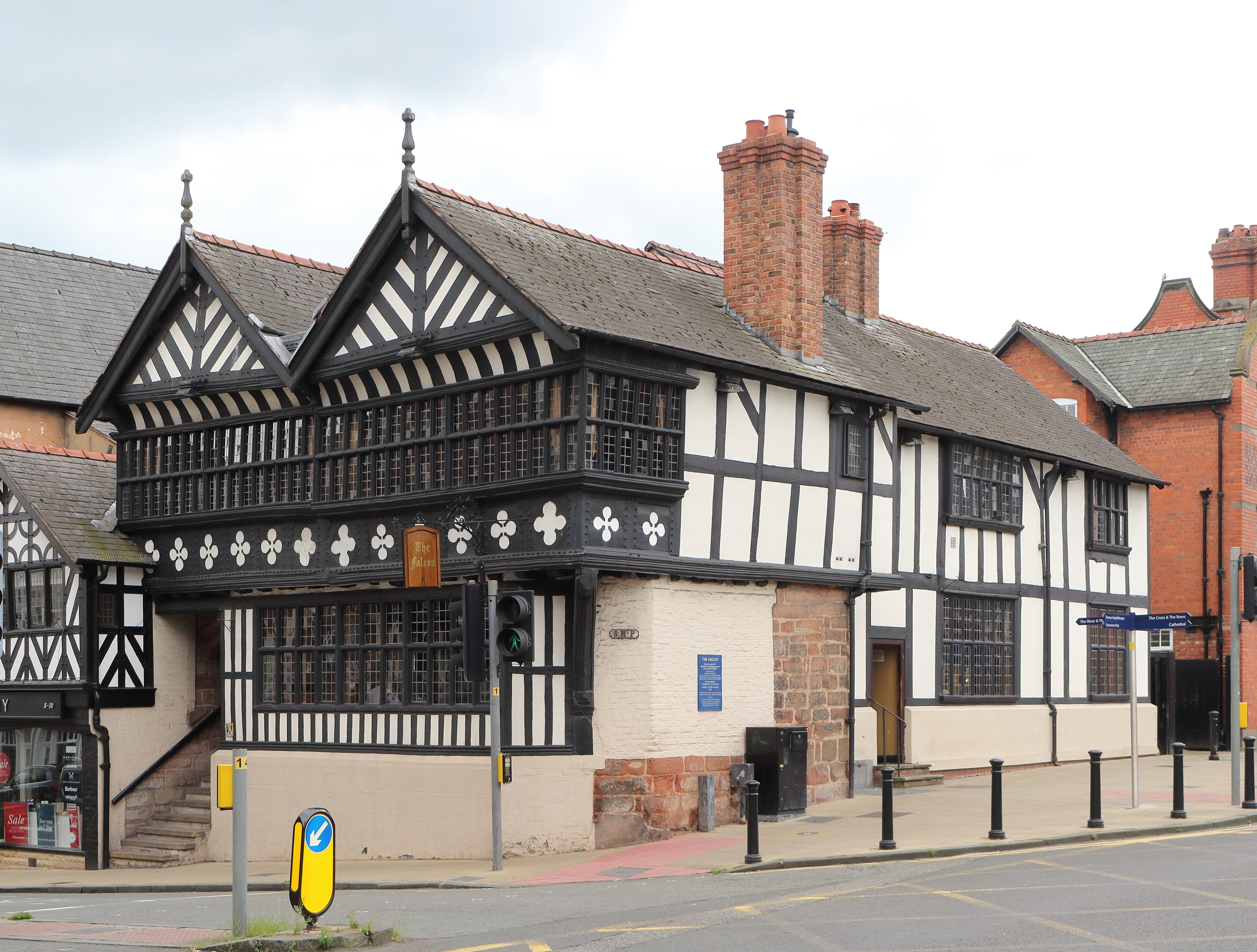
- The Falcon from the northeast

- Location in Cheshire
- 53.1883°N 2.8910°W
- Location: Chester, Cheshire, England

History
- Built: c. 1200
- Rebuilt: 13th century 16th–17th century

Site notes
- Architectural style: Timber framing
- Restored: 1643, c. 1879, c. 1886, 1979–82
- Restored by: John Douglas (c. 1879), Grayson and Ould (1886)

Listed Building – Grade I
- Official name: No.6 Falcon Inn
- Designated: 28 July 1955

The Falcon is a public house in Chester, Cheshire, England. It stands on the west side of Lower Bridge Street at its junction with Grosvenor Road. The Falcon is recorded in the National Heritage List for England as a designated Grade I listed building. The building formerly incorporated part of Chester Rows, but it was the first building to have its portion of the row enclosed in the 17th century.

== History ==
The building originated as a house in about 1200 and was later extended to the south along Lower Bridge Street, with a great hall running parallel to the street. During the 13th century it was rebuilt to incorporate its portion of the row. It was rebuilt again during the late 16th and early 17th centuries. The house was bought in 1602 by Sir Richard Grosvenor who extensively altered it some 40 years later to make it his town house. During the Civil War he moved his family here from his country home, Eaton Hall. In 1643 Sir Richard petitioned the City Assembly for leave to enlarge his house by enclosing the portion of the row which passed through his property. This was successful and it set a precedent for other residents of Lower Bridge Street to enclose their portion of the rows, or to build new structures which did not incorporate the rows.

In the late 18th century the building ceased to be the town house of the Grosvenor family. It continued to be owned by them, and between 1778 and 1878 it was licensed as The Falcon Inn. In about 1879 alterations were made by John Douglas. At this time it was known as The Falcon Cocoa House and it was re-opened as a temperance house. In 1886 Grayson and Ould carried out a restoration. By the 1970s the building had become virtually derelict. In 1979 the Falcon Trust was established, and the building was donated to the trust by the Grosvenor Estate. Between 1979 and 1982 the building was restored and in 1983 it won a Europa Nostra award. The building was donated to the Falcon Trust by the Grosvenor Estate, and was reopened by the Duke of Westminster in May 1992.

== Architecture ==
=== Exterior ===
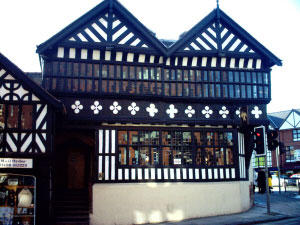
The Falcon from the east

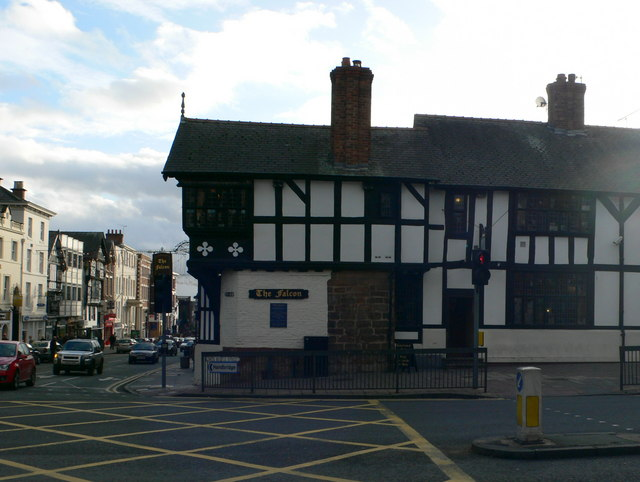
The Falcon from the north

The east face of The Falcon is on Lower Bridge Street and the north face on Grosvenor Road. The east face has two storeys on a sandstone plinth with two gables. Most of the sandstone is rendered. To the left is a staircase of nine steps leading from the street to the lower storey, which is the level of the enclosed row. The lower storey has close timber studding and an eleven-light leaded window. Above this is a row of twelve quatrefoil panels which slope slightly outwards over which is a continuous 34-light leaded window. The two gables are carried on brackets which curve outwards, and have herringbone struts, moulded bargeboards and shaped finials.

The north face give the appearance of two buildings. The older part is to the left (east) and the newer right (west) part was possibly added by Sir Richard Grosvenor in 1626. The eastern portion is a continuation of the east front. The street level and the lower storey are in sandstone, partly rendered, some of which has been replaced by brick. The upper storey has a window of six lights, which are continuous with those on the east face and two quatrefoils above. To the right of these is timber framing and a window. Above is a grey slate roof and a lateral shaped chimney in brick. The western portion has a rendered plinth with timber framing above. On the lower storey is a door and two windows, one with seven lights and the other with four. The upper storey has similar windows, plus a one-light window over the door.

=== Interior ===
The medieval undercroft is used as the beer cellar. It was originally a single three-bay chamber but has been divided by a brick wall into a two-bay north chamber and a single-bay south chamber. In the cellar are two octagonal stone piers and a massive central east–west oak beam. On the level of the row is a room along the east side, which is the enclosed portion of the row, and two rooms behind, with a further room in the west wing.

== See also ==
- Grade I listed buildings in Cheshire West and Chester
