= Chester Rows =

Buildings in Chester, England

Coordinates: 53.1902°N 2.8916°W

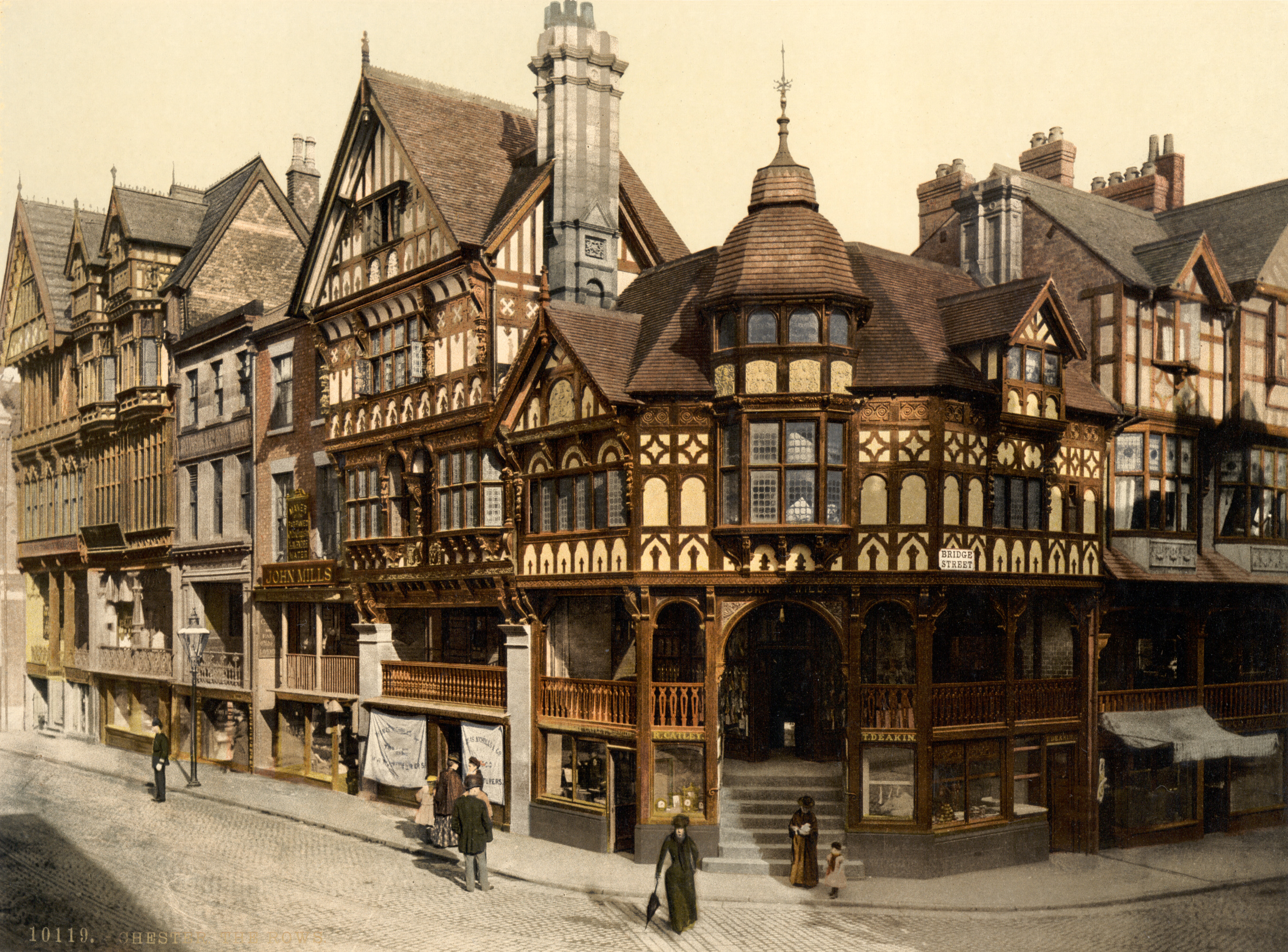
Photochrom of the Chester Rows as seen from the Cross, 1895

Chester Rows are a set of structures in each of the four main streets of Chester, in the United Kingdom, consisting of a series of covered walkways on the first floor behind which are entrances to shops and other premises. At street level is another set of shops and other premises, many of which are entered by going down a few steps. (Note: There are similar structures elsewhere, but not the same, nor on the scale of Chester; for example, on the south side of Gerechtigkeitsgasse, Bern, Switzerland, is a short stretch of covered elevated walkway with shops, but the level below is more of a half-storey containing lock-ups rather than full-sized premises.)

Dating from the medieval era, the Rows may have been built on top of rubble remaining from the ruins of Roman buildings, but their origin is still subject to speculation. In some places the continuity of the Rows has been blocked by enclosure or by new buildings, but in others modern buildings have retained the Rows in their designs. Undercrofts or "crypts" were constructed beneath the buildings in the Rows. The undercrofts are made from stone while most of the buildings in the Rows are timber.

Today about 20 of the stone undercrofts still exist, but at the level of the Rows very little medieval fabric remains. Many of the buildings containing portions of the Rows are listed and some are recorded in the English Heritage Archive. The premises on the street and Row levels are used for a variety of purposes; most are shops, but there are also offices, restaurants, cafés, and meeting rooms. Chester Rows are one of the city's main tourist attractions.

== Description ==
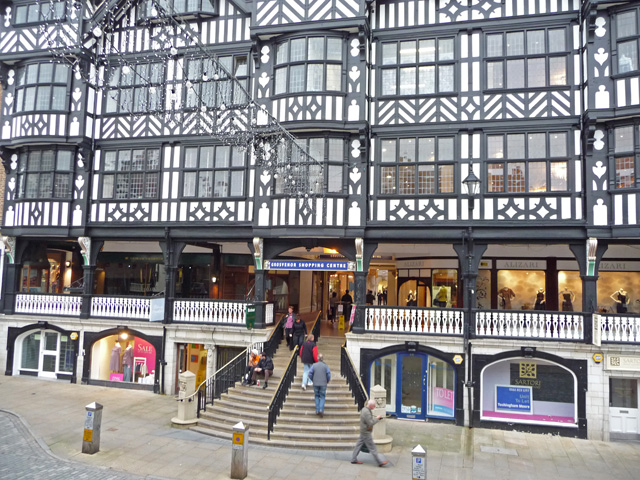
Bridge Street, showing shops both at street level and on the Row

At street level, the shops and other premises are similar to those found in other towns and cities, although many of the premises are entered by going down a few steps. On the first floor level are more shops and other premises, set back from the street, in front of which is a continuous walkway. The storey above this overlaps the walkway, which makes it a covered walkway, and this constitutes what is known as the "Row".

On the street side of the walkways are railings and an area which was used as shelves or stalls for the display of goods. The floors above the level of the Rows are used for commercial or domestic purposes, or for storage. The Rows are present, to a greater or lesser degree, in all the streets radiating from Chester Cross, namely Watergate Street, Northgate Street, Eastgate Street and Upper Bridge Street. They are continuous on both sides of Upper Bridge Street, along most of Watergate and Eastgate Street, but only for a short stretch along the east side of Northgate Street. Originally there were also Rows in Lower Bridge Street, but these were blocked during the 17th and 18th centuries.

As the ground floor buildings are usually lower than the street level, they are sometime known as "crypts". However, as the architectural historian Nikolaus Pevsner points out, this is not a strictly accurate description because the level of the floors of the buildings is a half-storey rather than a full-storey level below the street.

== Origins ==
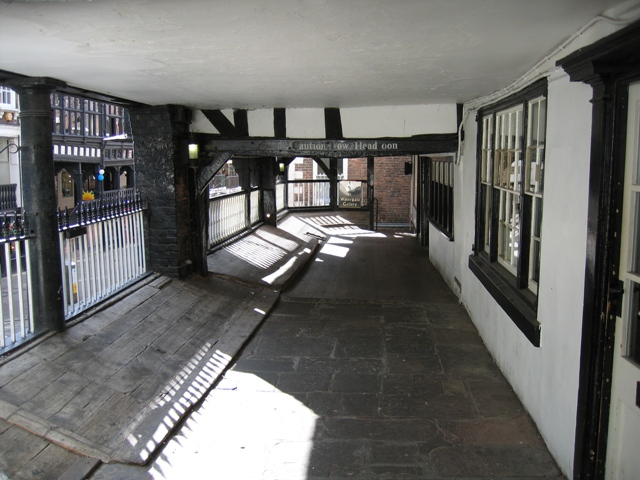
Inside Watergate Street Row, showing premises on the right and space for stalls and the railings overlooking the street on the left

Rows were built in the four main streets leading from Chester Cross, each of which originated during the settlement's early development. In the Roman period the main street, now Watergate Street and Eastgate Street, lay on an east–west axis. It was joined at what is now Chester Cross by the main road from the south, present-day Bridge Street.

During the Saxon period, a road to the north was added which is now called Northgate Street. Dendrochronological evidence shows that the Rows go back as far as the 13th century, but it is unlikely that they originated before 1200. The first record of the Rows appears in 1293, although it is uncertain whether it refers to a Row as it would be recognised today. The "earliest unambiguous instance" of the use of the term for an elevated walkway is in 1356.

Because the Rows are unique and their precise origins are unknown, they have been the subject of speculation. Chester has suffered from a series of fires. In 1278 the fire was so severe that almost the entire town within the walls was destroyed. It has been suggested that following this fire, the owners were ordered to make their ground floors fireproof, leading to the stone-lined undercrofts. From this, the suggestion has been made that there was "a general undertaking by the citizens of Chester ... to improve the commercial potential of their property by providing two-level access for customers".

Daniel Defoe, writing around 1724 in A tour thro' the whole island of Great Britain, describes the Rows of Chester as “long galleries, up one pair of stairs, which run along the side of the streets, before all the houses, though joined to them, and is pretended, they are to keep the people dry in walking along. This they do effectually, but then they...make the shops themselves dark, and the way in them is dark, dirty, and uneven.”

The 19th-century writer George Borrow makes the following claim in his book Wild Wales, published in 1862: "All the best shops in Chester are to be found in the rows. These rows, which you ascend by stairs up narrow passages, were originally built for the security of the wares of the principal merchants against the Welsh. Should the mountaineers break into the town, as they frequently did, they might rifle some of the common shops, where their booty would be slight, but those which contained the most costly articles would be beyond their reach; for at the first alarm the doors of the passages, up which the stairs led, would be closed, and all access to the upper streets cut off, from the open arches of which missiles of all kinds, kept ready for such occasions, could be discharged upon the intruders, who would soon be glad to beat a retreat."

Another theory links the Rows with the debris left from the Roman occupation of Chester. The rubble from the Roman buildings which had fallen into ruin was piled up alongside the streets. One theory suggests that in the medieval period buildings were constructed along the top of this debris. The buildings were set back from the street, a footpath passed in front of them, and wheeled vehicles passed along the street below. In time, the properties were improved and possibly during the 13th century, cellars or undercrofts were excavated in the debris beneath them.

When the buildings were further improved, upper storeys were built which overlapped the lower storey, providing a covered walkway. Stalls or shelves were added on the street side of the walkway for the display of goods, and so the system of Rows was developed. In a few places, for example at the corner of Eastgate Street and Northgate Street, another building was constructed between the walkway and the street. It is thought that, apart from a relatively small number of later buildings, the system of the Rows had reached its full extent by about 1350.

== Medieval period ==
During the medieval period, the Rows gave access to living accommodation. The doorway led into a hall, which was usually at right angles to the street. In some cases the front portion of the hall was used as a separate shop, and in other cases the whole hall was the shop. In the storey above the hall was the solar, a room providing private accommodation for the residents. In some cases, where the hall was larger, there were several shops on its frontage.

Below the Rows, at street level, were crypts or undercrofts. Many of these were stone-lined with ribbed vaults, and they were used for storage or for selling more valuable goods. Behind the hall, on the level of the Rows, was more domestic accommodation. Normally the kitchen was a separate building in the yard behind the house. The back yard was also used for cesspits and for the disposal of rubbish.

== Subsequent development ==
Although many of the Rows are still continuous, in some areas they have been blocked. In Lower Bridge Street there was originally a continuous Row; the first building to break the sequence was at the north end of the street, the public house now known as The Falcon.

In the 17th century, this was the town house of the Grosvenor family. It was rebuilt in 1626, maintaining its section of the Row. However, in 1643, during the Civil War siege of Chester, Sir Richard Grosvenor moved his family there from his country estate at Eaton Hall. In order to increase the size of the house he gained permission to enclose the Row. This set the fashion for other houses in Lower Bridge Street to enclose their sections of the Row. Later, completely new houses were constructed which did not incorporate the Row. One of these was Bridge House, built by Lady Calveley in 1676; it was the first house in Chester to be designed in neoclassical style.

In 1699 John Mather, a lawyer, gained permission to build a new house at 51 Lower Bridge Street, which also resulted in the loss of part of the Row. In 1728 Roger Ormes, rather than building a new house, enclosed the Row at his home, Tudor House, making it into an additional room.

During the Georgian era, more sections of the Rows were blocked, especially by commercial development on the north side of Watergate Street. In 1808, Thomas Harrison designed the Commercial Coffee Room in Northgate Street in neoclassical style, with an arcade at the ground-floor level, rather than continuing the Row on the first floor.

In 1859–60, Chester Bank was built in Eastgate Street, again obliterating its part of the Row. However other architects continued the tradition of maintaining the Rows in their designs; examples include the Georgian Booth Mansion of 1700 in Watergate Street, T. M. Penson's Gothic Revival Crypt Chambers of 1858 in Eastgate Street, and buildings in modern style constructed in Watergate Street in the 1960s.

== Today ==
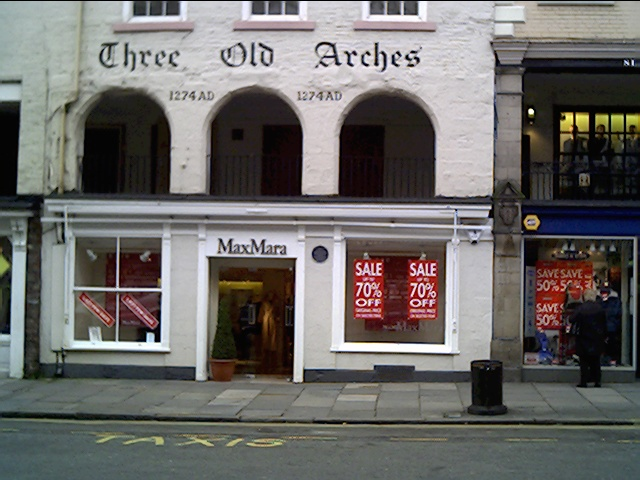
Three Old Arches

About 20 stone undercrofts still exist, some of them vaulted, dating from the 13th or early 14th century. One of the finest is Cowper House at No. 12 Bridge Street, with an undercroft of six bays built in sandstone rubble. It has plain rib-vaulting on plain corbels; the ribs are single-chamfered.

On the other side of Bridge Street, at No. 15, is another undercroft, this one having two double-chamfered arches. The Falcon, in Lower Bridge Street, has an undercroft which formerly had three bays but which has now been divided into two chambers. At No. 11 Watergate Street is a two-naved undercroft with four bays. Also in Watergate Street are undercrofts at Nos. 23 and 37, the latter having 5½ bays. Crypt Chambers, at No. 28 Eastgate Street, has a four-bay undercroft.

At the Row level, the medieval building was usually built in timber, and few examples remain. One which does remain is the building known as Three Old Arches. Consisting of three arches, the frontage of this shop is stone and is probably the earliest identified shopfront in England. The building also retains its undercroft and hall, the latter also built in stone.

According to the records in the English Heritage Archive, 14 buildings incorporate sections of Chester Rows. The records in the National Heritage List for England show that at least 95 of the buildings containing sections of the Rows are listed; 9 of these are listed as Grade I, 20 as Grade II*, and 66 as Grade II. The National Heritage List for England records the uses made by the premises at street level and in the Rows. Most of these are shops, but other uses include offices, restaurants and cafés, and private dwellings. The building at No. 1 Bridge Street has shops at both street and Row levels.

A department store occupies the street and Row levels (and the storey above) of Crypt Chambers. Bishop Lloyd's House in Watergate Street has a shop at the street level and above this there are meeting rooms, and the office of Chester Civic Trust.

The former St Michael's Church, which is now a heritage centre, includes part of Bridge Street Row in the lowest stage of its tower. A remaining example of a section of a Row with a building between the walkway and the street is No. 22 Eastgate Street.

Since 1995 access to the Rows has been improved by a pedestrianisation scheme, which affects all the streets containing Rows. Most vehicles are prohibited from using the area between 08:00 and 18:00, although unloading is allowed until 10:30 and from 16:30.

Chester Rows are a major tourist attraction in the city because of their unique nature, their attractive appearance and the covered shopping they provide.

On 7 July 2010 it was announced that Chester Rows were being considered as an applicant for the new United Kingdom Tentative List for World Heritage status by the Department of Culture, Media and Sport. This was a campaign pledge by local MP Samantha Dixon in her campaign in the 2022 City of Chester by-election.

== See also ==
- Grade I listed buildings in Cheshire West and Chester
- Loggia: a similar Italian architectural element
