= Square kilometre =

Unit of area

square kilometre
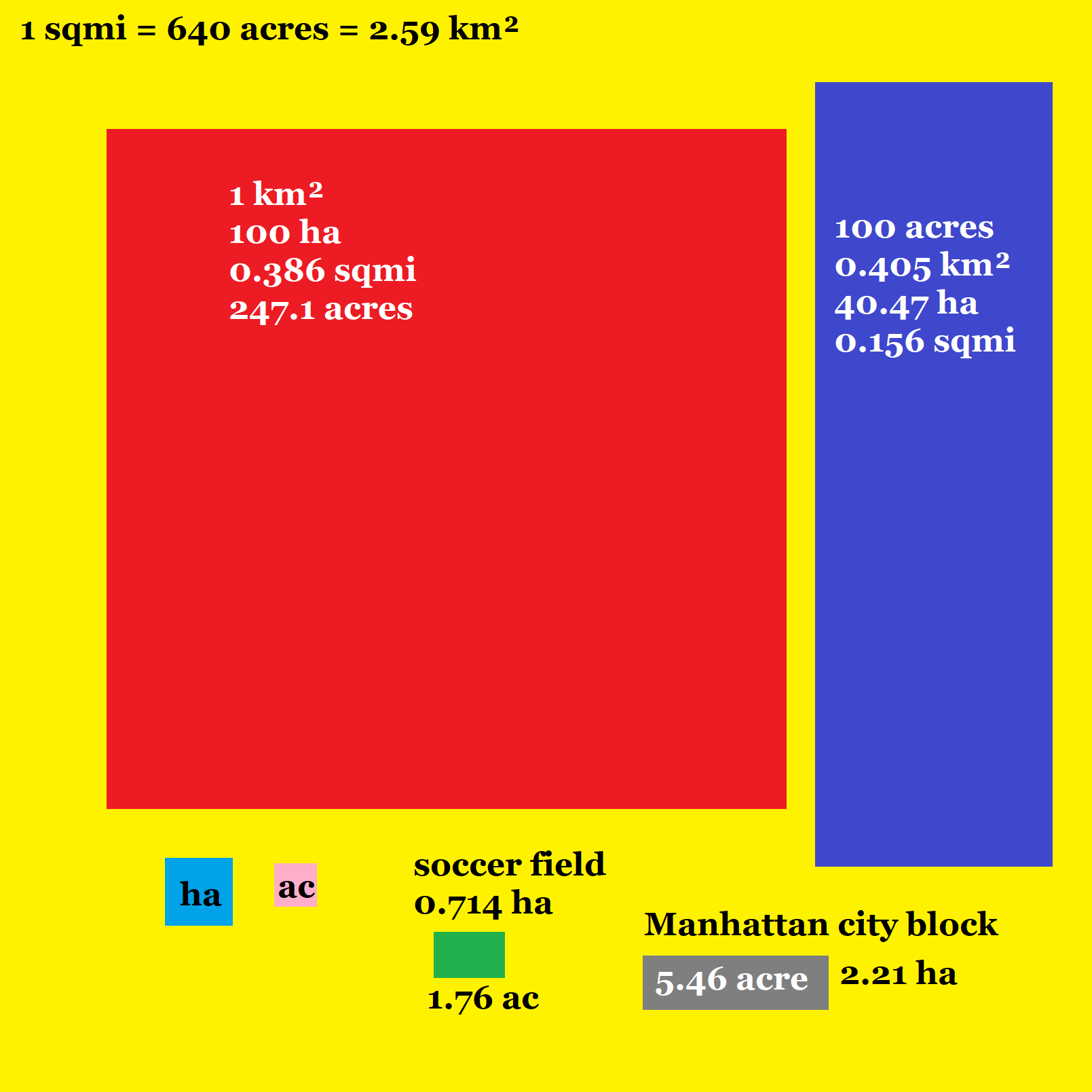
- The square kilometre (red square) compared to other areas, including a square mile (the entire yellow square)

General information
- Unit system: SI units
- Unit of: area
- Symbol: km^{2}

Conversions
1 km^{2} in ...	... is equal to ...
- SI units: 1000000 m^{2}; 100 ha
- Imperial/US: 0.3861 mi^{2}; 247.1 acres

The square kilometre (square kilometer in American spelling; symbol: km^{2}) is a multiple of the square metre, the SI unit of area or surface area. In the SI unit of area (m^{2}), 1 km^{2} is equal to 1M(m^{2}).

1 km^{2} is equal to:

- 1,000,000 square metres (m^{2})
- 100 hectares (ha)

It is also approximately equal to:

- 0.3861 square miles
- 247.1 acres

Conversely:

- 1 m^{2} = 0.000001 (10^{−6}) km^{2}
- 1 hectare = 0.01 (10^{−2}) km^{2}
- 1 square mile = 2.5899 km^{2}
- 1 acre = about 0.004047 km^{2}

The symbol "km^{2}" means (km)^{2}, square kilometre and not k(m^{2}), kilo–square metre. For example, 3 km^{2} is equal to 3×(1,000m)^{2} = 3,000,000 m^{2}, not 3,000 m^{2}.

== Examples of areas of 1 square kilometre ==
=== Topographical map grids ===
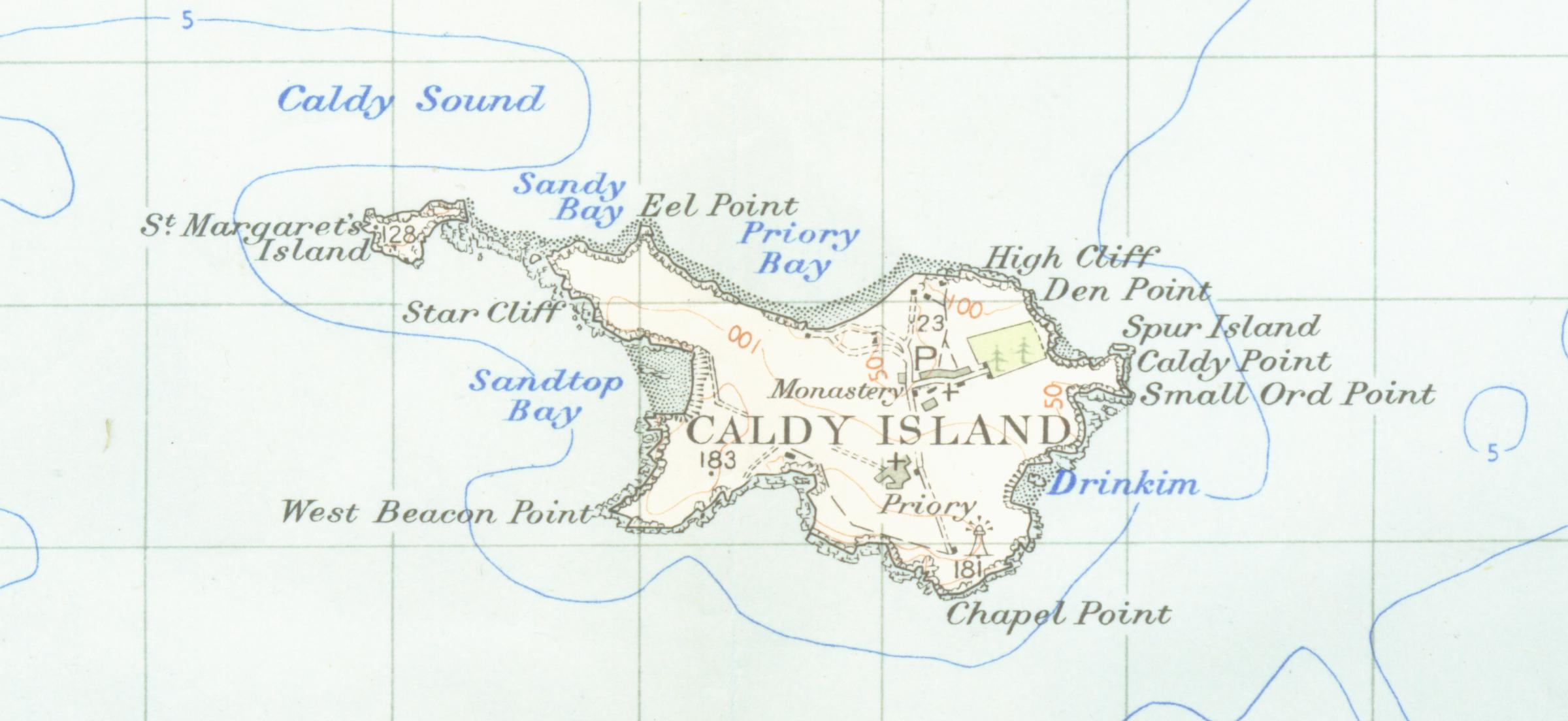
Part of an Ordnance Survey map of Caldey Island, published 1952. The grid lines are at one-kilometre intervals, giving each square an area of one square kilometre. The map shows that the area of the island is about two square kilometres.

Topographical map grids are worked out in metres, with the grid lines being 1,000 metres apart.

- 1:100,000 maps are divided into squares representing 1 km^{2}, each square on the map being one square centimetre in area and representing 1 km^{2} on the surface of the Earth.
- For 1:50,000 maps, the grid lines are 2 cm apart. Each square on the map is 2 cm by 2 cm (4 cm^{2}) and represents 1 km^{2} on the surface of the Earth.
- For 1:25,000 maps, the grid lines are 4 cm apart. Each square on the map is 4 cm by 4 cm (16 cm^{2}) and represents 1 km^{2} on the surface of the Earth.

In each case, the grid lines enclose one square kilometre.

=== Medieval city centres ===
Map of Delft, Netherlands, dated 1659. The walls enclosed an area of about 1 square kilometre.

The area enclosed by the walls of many European medieval cities were about one square kilometre. These walls are often either still standing or the route they followed is still clearly visible, such as in Brussels, where the wall has been replaced by a ring road, or in Frankfurt, where the wall has been replaced by gardens. The approximate area of the old walled cities can often be worked out by fitting the course of the wall to a rectangle or an oval (ellipse). Examples include:

- Delft, Netherlands (See map alongside) 52°0′54″N 4°21′34″E

The walled city of Delft was approximately rectangular.

The approximate length of rectangle was about 1.30 kilometres (0.81 mi).
The approximate width of the rectangle was about 0.75 kilometres (0.47 mi).
A perfect rectangle with these measurements has an area of 1.30×0.75 = 0.9 km^{2}

- Lucca (Italy) 43°50′38″N 10°30′2″E

The medieval city is roughly rectangular with rounded north-east and north-west corners.

The maximum distance from east to west is 1.36 kilometres (0.85 mi).
The maximum distance from north to south is 0.80 kilometres (0.50 mi).
A perfect rectangle of these dimensions would be 1.36×0.80 = 1.088 km^{2}.

- Bruges (Belgium) 51°12′39″N 3°13′28″E

The medieval city of Bruges, a major centre in Flanders, was roughly oval or elliptical in shape with the longer or semi-major axis running north and south.

The maximum distance from north to south (semi-major axis) is 2.53 kilometres (1.57 mi).
The maximum distance from east to west (semi-minor axis) is 1.81 kilometres (1.12 mi).
A perfect ellipse of these dimensions would be 2.53 × 1.81 × (π/4) = 3.597 km^{2}.

- Chester United Kingdom 53°12′1″N 2°52′45″W

Chester is one of the smaller English cities that has a near-intact city wall.

The distance from Northgate to Watergate is about 855 metres.
The distance from Eastgate to Westgate is about 589 metres.
A perfect rectangle of these dimensions would be (855/1000) × (589/1000) = 0.504 km^{2}.

=== Parks ===
Parks come in all sizes; a few are almost exactly one square kilometre in area. Here are some examples:

- Riverside Country Park, UK.
- Brierley Forest Park, UK.
- Rio de Los Angeles State Park, California, US
- Jones County Central Park, Iowa, US.
- Kiest Park, Dallas, Texas, US
- Hole-in-the-Wall Park & Campground, Grand Manan Island, Bay of Fundy, New Brunswick, Canada
- Downing Provincial Park, British Columbia, Canada
- Citadel Park, Poznan, Poland
- Sydney Olympic Park, Sydney, Australia, contains 6.63 square kilometres of wetlands and waterways.

=== Golf courses ===
Using the figures published by golf course architects Crafter and Mogford, a course should have a fairway width of 120 metres and 40 metres clear beyond the hole. Assuming a 6,000-metre (6,600 yd) 18-hole course, an area of 80 hectares (0.8 square kilometre) needs to be allocated for the course itself. (Note: Assume that each hole requires (6000÷18 + 40) = 373 metres in length. The area needed is (18 × 373 × 120 ÷ 10,000) = 80.64 ha (1 hectare = 10,000 square metres).) Examples of golf courses that are about one square kilometre include:

- Manchester Golf Club, UK
- Northop Country Park, Wales, UK
- The Trophy Club, Lebanon, Indiana, US
- Qingdao International Country Golf Course, Qingdao, Shandong, China
- Arabian Ranches Golf Club, Dubai
- Sharm el Sheikh Golf Courses: Sharm el Sheikh, South Sinai, Egypt
- Belmont Golf Club, Lake Macquarie, NSW, Australia

=== Other areas of one square kilometre or thereabouts ===
- The Old City of Jerusalem is almost 1 square kilometre in area.
- Milton Science Park, Oxfordshire, UK.
- Mielec Industrial Park, Mielec, Poland
- The Guildford Campus of Guildford Grammar School, South Guildford, Western Australia
- Sardar Vallabhbhai National Institute of Technology (SVNIT), Surat, India
- Île aux Cerfs, near the east coast of Mauritius.
- Peng Chau Island, Hong Kong

== See also ==
- Conversion of units
- SI prefix for the precise meaning of the prefix "k"
- Square Kilometre Array, a proposed radio telescope in both South Africa and Australia, which is intended to have a collecting area of approximately 1 km^{2}
