= Chester city walls =

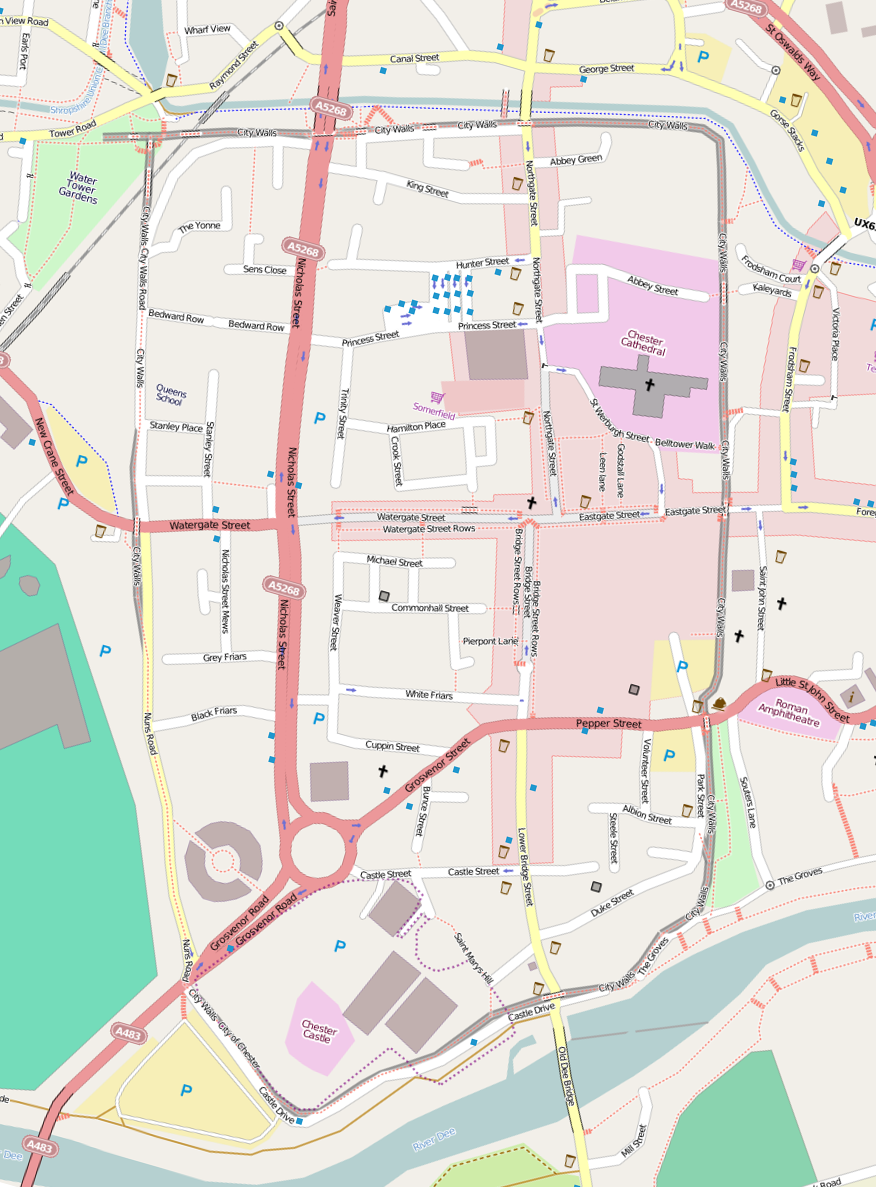
- The grey line indicates the present day city walls

General information
- Status: Open to the public
- Type: Fortification
- Architectural style: Medieval
- Location: Chester, England

Design and construction
- Designations: Scheduled monument with most of the walls, towers, and gates being Grade I listed

Website
- www.cheshirewestandchester.gov.uk

Chester city walls consist of a defensive structure built to protect the city of Chester in Cheshire, England. Their construction was started by the Romans when they established the fortress of Deva Victrix between 70 and 80 [CE]. It originated with a rampart of earth and turf surmounted by a wooden palisade. From about 100 CE they were reconstructed using sandstone, but were not completed until over 100 years later. Following the Roman occupation nothing is known about the condition of the walls until Æthelflæd refounded Chester as a burgh in 907. The defences were improved, although the precise nature of the improvement is not known. After the Norman conquest, the walls were extended to the west and the south to form a complete circuit of the medieval city. The circuit was probably complete by the middle of the 12th century.

Maintenance of the structure of the walls was an ongoing concern. They were further fortified before the Civil War, and were damaged during the war. Following this they ceased to have a defensive purpose, and were developed for leisure and recreation. The walls are now a major tourist attraction, and form an almost complete circuit of the former medieval city, with a total walkway length of 2.95 kilometres (1.8 mi). Upkeep and repair of the walls continues to be a problem.

== History ==
=== Military use ===
Chester city walls over two millennia

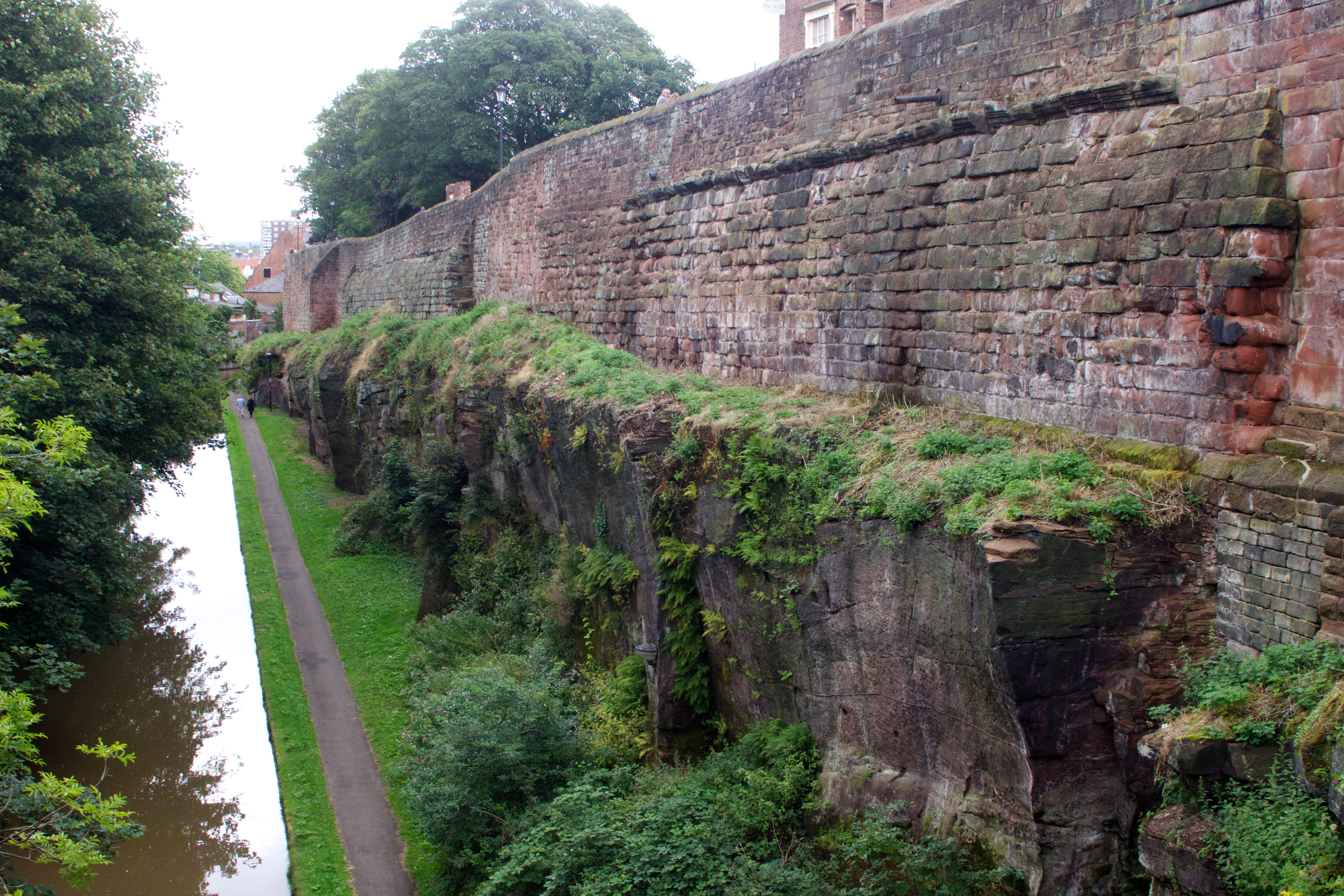
Original Roman walls along Chester Canal

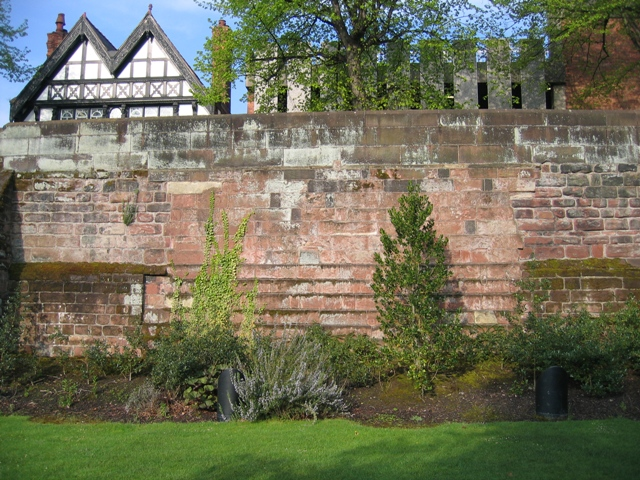
Walls repaired after the English Civil War

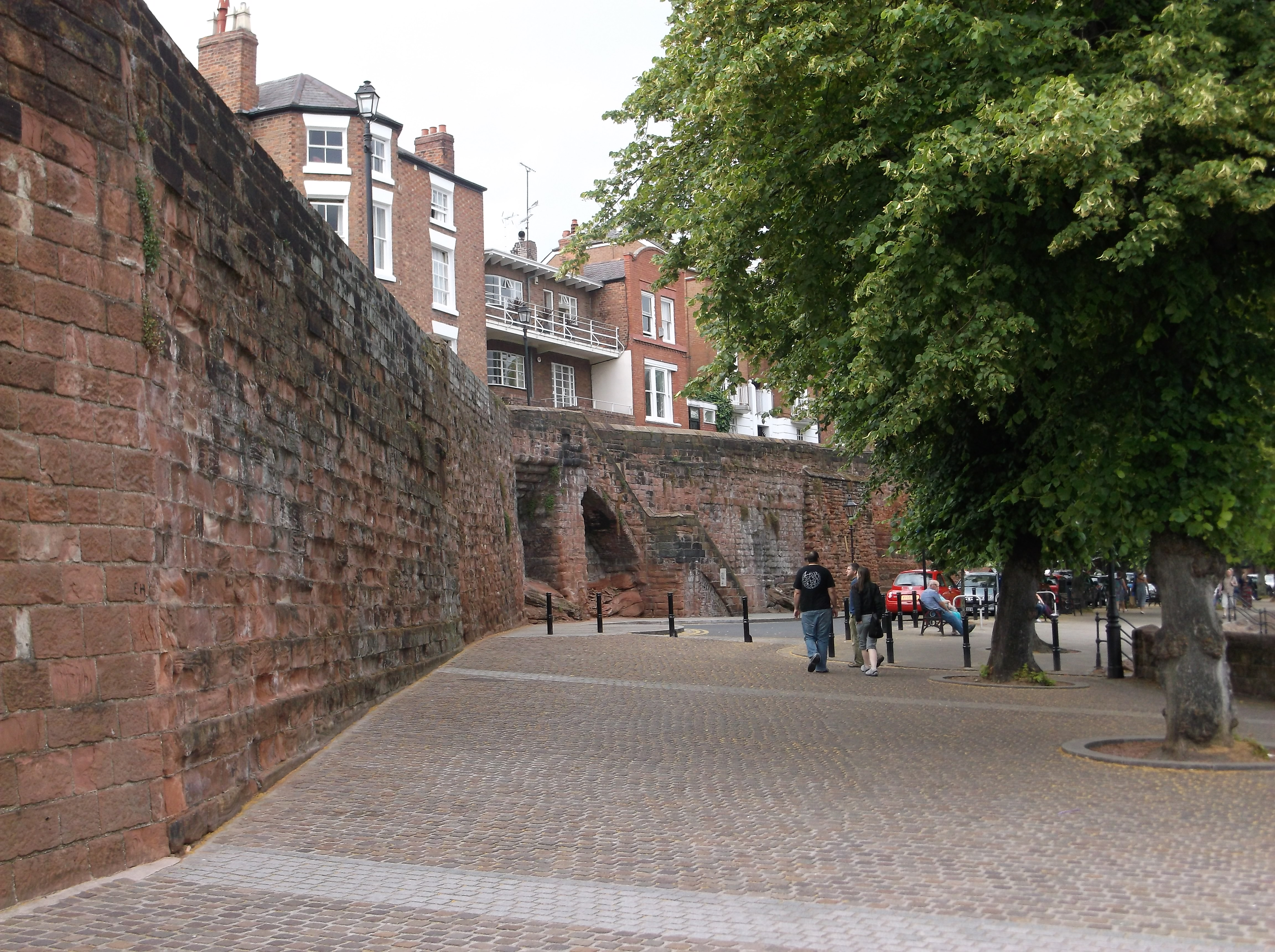
Georgian promenade walls near Bridgegate

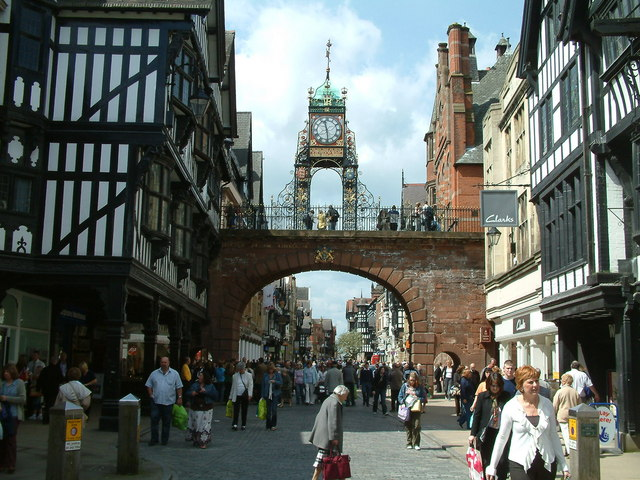
Victorian Eastgate Clock

In about 74 or 75 AD the Roman legion Legio II Adiutrix established a fortress in Chester. The fortress was initially defended by an earth rampart surmounted by a wooden palisade and surrounded by a ditch with a sharp V-shaped profile. It is likely that the rampart was about 3 m (10 ft) high on a base of about 6 m (20 ft). The earth for the rampart was obtained from digging the ditch. It was set on a base of logs and held together by branches and brushwood. At intervals of about 160 m (520 ft) along the ramparts were wooden towers with a square base of about 4.5 m (15 ft); they were probably about 7.5 m (25 ft) high. On each of the four sides was a main gate with timber towers. The gates on the north and east sides stood on the present sites of Northgate and Eastgate. From about 90 AD Chester was occupied by Legio XX Valeria Victrix, who started a programme of rebuilding, including the improvement of the walls. Starting in about 100 AD the earth walls were reconstructed using sandstone. A wall of stone was added to the earth rampart. This consisted of large square blocks of stone built on a chamfered plinth up to a walkway about 4.9 m (16 ft) above the base. It was surmounted by an elaborately carved cornice, and a parapet topped by capstones. The gates and towers were also rebuilt in stone. It is thought that the north gate was a single arch, while the others had twin portals. The east gate formed the main entry to the fortress, and was particularly impressive, possibly with three storeys. The stone was quarried locally from the immediate area of the fortress. Although started in about 100 AD, the rebuilding of the walls was abandoned in the early part of the 2nd century, perhaps with the walls incomplete, and was not finished until over 100 years later. The walls continued to be maintained throughout the Roman occupation, with major repairs undertaken during the 4th century.

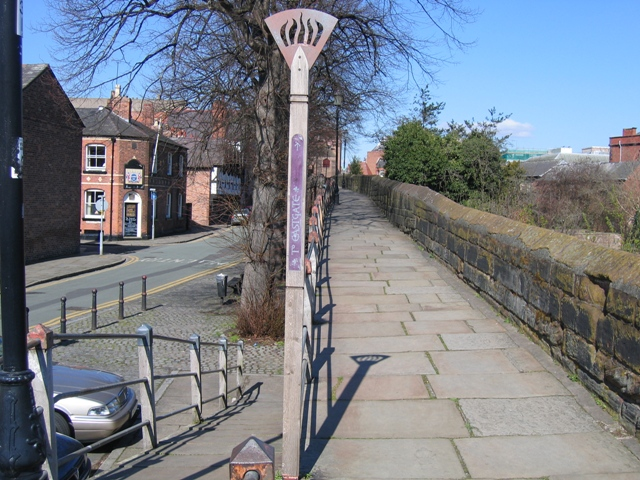
The south east section of the medieval walls by Barnaby's Tower

Nothing is known about the condition of the walls between the end of the Roman occupation in the late 4th century and the refounding of Chester by Æthelflæd as a burgh in 907 as part of the reconquest of Mercia by the Anglo-Saxons. Parts of the Roman walls were still present, as they continue to stand today. The Anglo-Saxons certainly repaired the northern and eastern sections of the Roman walls. At some time Roman stones, including tombstones, were used in repairs, but it is uncertain whether this was during this period or later. There is evidence, including the discovery of a Saxon U-shaped ditch, that the wall was extended from the southeast corner of the Roman wall to the river, forming an L-shaped defence, but whether this would have been a stone or an earth defence is unknown. There is a reference to repairing the walls in the Domesday Survey. Following the Norman conquest the army of William the Conqueror arrived in Chester in 1069–70, and the king ordered that a castle should be built. This was constructed outside the site of the Roman fortress, to the southwest in an elevated position overlooking the River Dee. This necessitated the extension of the walls to the west and south to incorporate the castle, leading to the circuit of the walls currently present. Three new gates were built, the Watergate in the west wall, and the Shipgate and Bridgegate. The latter two gates were certainly built by the 1120s, and it is thought that the medieval circuit of the walls was complete by 1162. They then consisted of the curtain wall itself, gates, towers and a ditch. The Saxon ditch has been filled in, and the medieval ditches were dug further from the walls. The earlier ditch had been shallow, probably no more than 1 m (3 ft) deep. However, following a siege of Chester Castle during the Second Barons' War in 1265, a larger ditch was dug, this one being over 2 m (6 ft) deep.

The finance required for the upkeep of the walls was mainly by a series of murages granted by the king, duties levied on merchandise passing into and out of the city. The main gates were under the control of hereditary sergeants who collected tolls and organised watches on the walls. During the 15th century the granting of murages was delegated to the city authorities, but keeping up with the necessary repairs was a continuing problem. Breaches occurred in 1569, 1608 and 1629, and in both 1589 and in 1641 the walls were described as being "ruinous". In the expectation of the coming Civil War, repairs were carried out in the early 1640s, and further fortifications were added to the walls and in the outer suburbs. The walls were heavily damaged during the siege of the city by Parliamentarian forces in 1645, this included two major breaches.

=== Recreational use ===
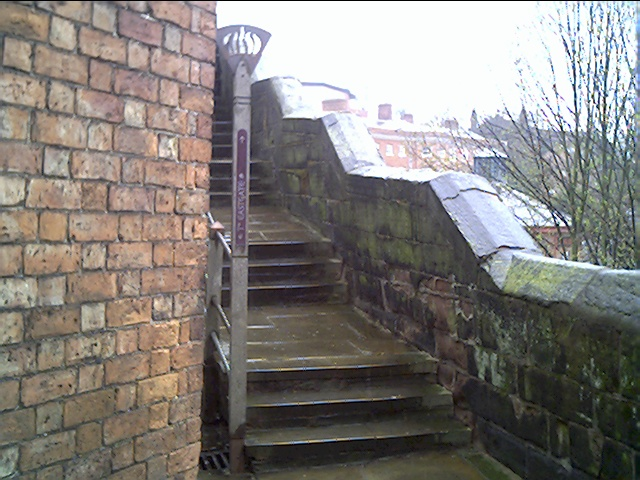
The Wishing Steps in the south east corner of the city walls

After the end of the Civil War, the walls ceased to have any military or defensive function, and increasingly became used for recreational purposes. In 1707 the City Assembly made a grant of £1,000 (equivalent to £210,000 in 2025) to repair and re-flag the walls to make a walkway with an unfortified parapet. Notable people walking the walls in the early 18th century included John Wesley and Samuel Johnson. By this time the main gates were too narrow for the increasing traffic, so they were all rebuilt with wider arches. The gates had also prevented an unobstructed perambulation of the walls, and the opportunity was taken to carry the walkway over the new gates. Eastgate was replaced in 1768, Bridgegate in 1781, and Watergate in 1788. Other measures were taken to improve the accessibility for walkers; these included the building of Recorder's Steps in 1720 on the southern part of the walls, and the Wishing Steps in 1785 on a steeply inclined section to the east of the Recorder's Steps. Between 1808 and 1810 Northgate was rebuilt. This gate had contained the city jail, and a new jail was built in the south of the city. The jail yard extended southwards towards the river and this necessitated removing Shipgate, thus creating a permanent breach in the wall.

Improvements in transport in the 19th and 20th centuries have resulted in further alterations to the walls. Until the early 19th century the only bridge over the Dee had been the Old Dee Bridge immediately to the south of Bridgegate. In the 1820s Grosvenor Bridge was built, passing through the walls at the southwest corner. In 1846 the Chester and Holyhead Railway was built, cutting the walls and passing through arches under the northwest corner. By the 1930s road traffic had increased and was causing severe congestion in the middle of the city, particularly at Chester Cross. A new road was created to the south of the centre of the city, breaching the east wall to the west of the Amphitheatre. Newgate was built to allow the traffic to pass and to take the walkway over the road; this opened in 1938. Following the Second World War traffic increased further and in the 1960s the Inner Ring Road was built to take traffic from Grosvenor Bridge to the west of the city centre, causing a substantial breach in the walls. Where it breached the north wall a concrete footbridge, named St Martin's Gate, was built and opened in 1966.

== Conservation ==
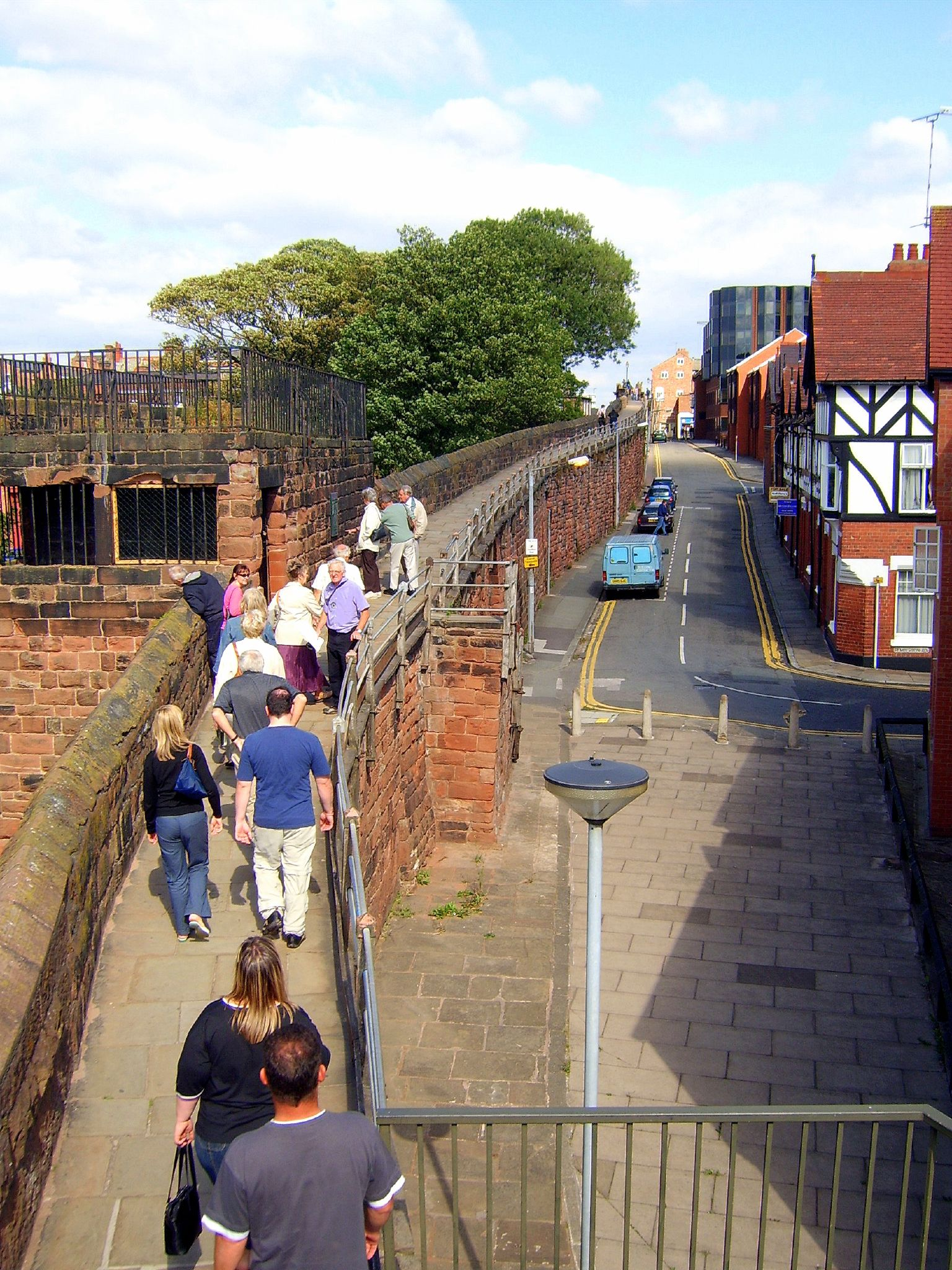
Morgan's Mount, on the northern section of walls, was built for Royalist cannons during the English Civil War (pictured from St Martin's Gate).

Chester city walls comprise the most complete Roman and medieval defensive town walls in Britain. The circuit, which measures almost 2 miles (3.2 km) in circumference, is now a major tourist attraction for visitors to the city. The walls are recognised as a Scheduled Monument, and almost every section of the walls is recorded in the National Heritage List for England as a designated Grade I listed building, the only exception being the section between Bridgegate and the County Hall (listed at Grade II*).

The walk is approximately rectangular in plan, on a continuous elevated walkway, apart from a short section on the south of the city. It incorporates medieval structures, including Bonewaldesthorne's Tower, attached to the Water Tower at the northwest corner, Pemberton's Parlour and Morgan's Mount on the north section of the walls, Phoenix Tower, Thimbleby's Tower and Barnaby's Tower on the east section of the walls, and the base of a drum tower on the south section. It crosses roads on the four major medieval gates to the city, Northgate, Eastgate, Bridgegate, and Watergate, and more modern roads on Newgate and St Martin's Gate. The walk also crosses Kaleyard Gate on the eastern section of the walls, and passes the Recorder's Steps on the south section.

Upkeep and repair of the walls is an ongoing conservation project. In 2008 part of the wall collapsed near the Eastgate. After repairs, the section was reopened in 2010. There have been several fatal accidents of people falling from the walls. Since 2011, a section of wall between Morgan's Mount and Northgate Bridge has been closed because it was found to be moving and had to be propped up. In January 2020 a SE section of wall collapsed while development work was being carried out nearby.

== See also ==
- List of sections of Chester city walls and associated structures
- Grade I listed buildings in Cheshire West and Chester
- Grade II* listed buildings in Cheshire West and Chester
- List of cities with defensive walls
- List of town walls in England and Wales
