= List of sections of Chester city walls and associated structures =

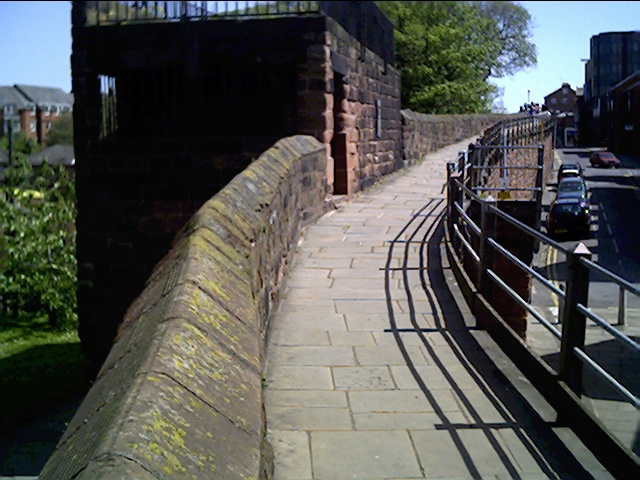
Part of the north wall showing Morgan's Mount

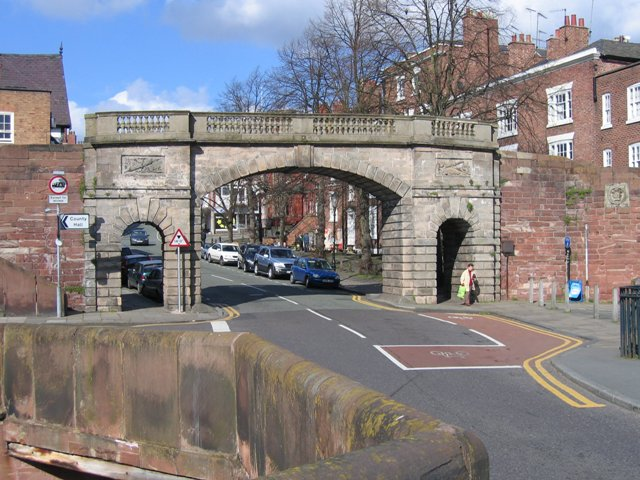
Bridgegate in the south wall

Chester, showing the sections of the Medieval City walls and structures in the list below

The Chester city walls surround what was the extent of the English city of Chester in the medieval period. They started as a defensive structure for the fortress of Deva Victrix during the Roman occupation of Britain. Originating between 70 and 90 AD, they consisted of earth ramparts surmounted by wooden palisades. At intervals there were wooden gates and towers. Following the arrival of the Legio XX Valeria Victrix at the end of the 1st century the walls were reconstructed in sandstone, and building work continued, with interruptions, until the Roman circuit of the walls was completed over 100 years later. During the same period the towers and gates were rebuilt in stone. Repairs were carried out on the walls throughout the Roman occupation. Chester was refortified in 907 by Æthelflæd, but how this affected the walls is not precisely known. The north and east Roman walls were certainly used in the fortification, as they are still in existence today, but it is possible that they were extended to the west and south to meet the River Dee.

The full circuit of the walls as they are today was completed by the end of the 12th century. The north and east walls were extended, the west and south walls were built, and the towers and gates were incorporated. Only the north and east walls contain towers, as the river was thought to be a sufficient defence on the southern and western sides. Repair of the walls was an ongoing problem during the medieval period, and at some time 3rd-century Roman altars and tombstones were used as raw materials; some of the tombstones are on display in the Grosvenor Museum. The wall and its towers were damaged during the English Civil War, particularly in the sieges of the city between 1644 and 1646. Further rebuilding and repairs were carried out following the war, but it was a constant struggle to cope with the scale of the necessary repairs.

By the 18th century the walls had outlived their purpose as a defensive structure, and were becoming popular as a promenade. In 1707, the city Assembly spent £1,000 (equivalent to £210,000 in 2025) to repair the walls and to flag the footway. Distinguished visitors who walked the walls around that time included John Wesley and Samuel Johnson. The four major gates were replaced, Eastgate, Bridgegate and Watergate during the 18th century and Northgate, with its associated gaol, in 1808–10. Shortly after 1810, part of the southern section of the walk was demolished to accommodate the yard for the new gaol. In 1846, the northeastern corner of the walls was breached by the Chester and Holyhead Railway. Newgate was opened in 1938 to bridge a new road built to relieve traffic congestion in the city centre, and in 1966 St Martin's Gate was built across the Inner Ring Road.

The "walls, tower, gates and posterns of the City of Chester" are recognised as a scheduled monument. All the towers associated with the walls are designated as Grade I listed buildings and all walls are Grade I, except for the wall between Bridgegate and the former County Hall. The gates are all designated Grade I except for Old Newgate, Newgate, and St Martin's Gate.

The circuit of the walls extends for 2 miles (3 km), rises to a height of 40 feet (12.2 m), and "is the most complete circuit of Roman and medieval defensive town wall in Britain". The editor of the Victoria County History states "the walls still in 2000 formed an almost unbroken pathway and a delight to visitors".

This list starts in the northwest corner with Bonewaldesthorne's Tower, and includes the Water Tower, which is outside the circuit of the walls, but connected by a spur wall to Bonewaldesthorne's Tower. It then continues in a clockwise direction, starting with the north wall.

== Structures ==
Key to heritage status
Status	Criteria
I	Grade I listed. Building of exceptional interest, sometimes considered to be internationally important
II*	Grade II* listed. Particularly important building of more than special interest
II	Grade II listed. Building of national importance and special interest

List of the sections of the walls, associated structures and locations
Name	Location	Heritage status	Photograph	Notes
1 Bonewaldesthorne's Tower	53.19267°N 2.89892°W	I		The tower stands at the northwest corner of the city walls. It was first recorded in 1249, and in the following century became the gatehouse to the Water Tower. During the 19th and the earlier part of the 20th century, in association with the Water Tower, it was used as a museum. Historic England List Entry Number: 1376128
2 Spur Wall and Water Tower	53.19257°N 2.89957°W	I		The Water Tower is outside the northwest corner of the walls, and is joined to Bonewaldesthorne's Tower by a spur wall. It was built between 1322 and 1325, at which time it stood in the River Dee. In the 19th and early 20th century it was used, together with Bonewaldesthorne's Tower, as a museum. Due to silting of the river, it now stands some 200 yards (183 m) inland. Historic England List Entry Number: 1376129
3 Wall between Bonewaldesthorne's Tower and Pemberton's Parlour	53.19288°N 2.89780°W	I		This section of the wall is 755 feet (230 m) long, and approximately 7 feet (2 m) wide. It dates from the late 11th or early 12th century; the raised promenade was added between 1701 and 1708. In 1846 it was pierced to allow the Chester and Holyhead Railway to pass through. Historic England List Entry Number: 1376130
4 Pemberton's Parlour	53.19300°N 2.89723°W	I		Originally built as a circular tower, it was converted into a semicircular tower in the early 18th century, and reconstructed in 1894. It is named after a former mayor of Chester who owned a nearby ropewalk, standing on which he is said to have supervised the conversion work. Historic England List Entry Number: 1376131
5 Wall between Pemberton's Parlour and St Martin's Gate	53.19307°N 2.89684°W	I		This section of the walls, about 262 feet (80 m) long, with a walkway almost 7 feet (2 m) wide, was built in the late 11th or the early 12th century. The raised walkway was added between 1702 and 1708. Historic England List Entry Number: 1376132
6 St Martin's Gate	53.19319°N 2.89633°W	No listing		In the 1960s the Inner Ring Road, breaching the walls, was built. St Martin's Gate consists of a concrete arch, opened in 1966, to carry the wall walk over the road.
7 Wall between St Martin's Gate and Morgan's Mount	53.19319°N 2.89603°W	I		This short section of the wall is 100 feet (30 m) long. The northeast tower of the Roman wall stood within this section, its site marked by setts let into the pavement. Opposite Morgan's Mount are two flights of steps that may mark the position of a former tower. Historic England List Entry Number: 1376133
8 Morgan's Mount	53.19328°N 2.89588°W	I		Morgan's Mount was built in 1645 during the English Civil War as an observation platform and gun emplacement. It is a rectangular structure with a chamber at the level of the walkway. Steps lead up to a platform with a parapet surmounted by a railing. Historic England List Entry Number: 1376134
9 Wall between Morgan's Mount and Northgate	53.19351°N 2.89474°W	I		This section is about 1,038 feet (316 m) long, and incorporates between five and eight courses of Roman masonry in its lower part. The section contains two segmental-arched openings. Historic England List Entry Number: 1376135
10 Northgate	53.19380°N 2.89333°W	I		Northgate stands on the site of the northern entrance to the Roman fortress. The present structure replaces an earlier medieval gatehouse. It was designed by Thomas Harrison and is constructed in sandstone. It consists of a central arch for the road, flanked by smaller rectangular portals for the pavements. Historic England List Entry Number: 1376370
11 Wall between Northgate and Phoenix Tower	53.19410°N 2.89153°W	I		This section of the wall contains two full-height parts of the Roman wall surmounted by a moulded Roman cornice. The western part rises from the bedrock, and is up to 13 courses high and 35 stones long; that to the east is up to 11 courses high and 42 stones long. The whole section measures about 1,230 feet (375 m). Historic England List Entry Number: 1376136
12 Phoenix Tower	53.19416°N 2.89041°W	I		The tower was used as a meeting place by two of the city guilds from the 16th to the 18th century. The phoenix was the emblem of one of the guilds, and is carved on a plaque on the tower. The tower was damaged in the English Civil War during the siege of Chester in 1645. Since the 19th century it has been promoted as a tourist attraction. Historic England List Entry Number: 1376157
13 Wall between Phoenix Tower and Kaleyard Gate	53.19363°N 2.89014°W	I		This section of the wall contains Roman and medieval masonry, and is about 1,198 feet (365 m) long. Slightly to the north of Kaleyard Gate, on the west side, is a flight of 11 steps, probably dating from the 18th century, leading to Abbey Street. Historic England List Entry Number: 1376158
14 Kaleyard Gate	53.19260°N 2.88963°W	I		Kaleyard Gate is a postern (secondary) gate in the walls. It was built in the 13th century following a petition to Edward I by the monks of St Werburgh's Abbey to give them direct access to their vegetable garden. Historic England List Entry Number: 1376161
15 Wall between Kaleyard Gate and Eastgate	53.19140°N 2.88907°W	I		Two portions of Roman masonry are incorporated in this section, which measures about 1,215 feet (370 m). Leading from this section are a ramp on the west side, parallel to the wall, leading up from Abbey Street; steps on the east side leading to Frodsham Street, at the site of a former drum tower; and modern stone steps on the west side leading to St Werburgh Street. Historic England List Entry Number: 1376162
16 Eastgate	53.19087°N 2.88880°W	I		The gate was built in 1768, replacing earlier gates on the site of the original eastern entry to the Roman city. The wrought iron clock tower, designed by the local architect John Douglas, was added in 1899 to celebrate the diamond jubilee of Queen Victoria. The clock mechanism was made by J. B. Joyce and Company of Whitchurch, Shropshire. Historic England List Entry Number: 1376249
17 Wall between Eastgate and Thimbleby's Tower	53.18998°N 2.88845°W	I		This section of the walls contains Roman material. On the east side an L-shaped stone stairway of 14 plus 20 steps leads down towards St Johns Street. On the other side a 1960s concrete footbridge leads into the Grosvenor Shopping Centre. In 2008 part of this section of the wall collapsed and 98 feet (30 m) of the walkway was closed to pedestrian access. Following repair it re-opened in 2010. Historic England List Entry Number: 1376163
18 Thimbleby's Tower	53.18940°N 2.88816°W	I		Formerly a drum tower, this was partly demolished during the siege of Chester, losing its upper storeys. It was modified when the walkway was created in the 18th century. In the 1990s a steeply pitched gabled roof, hung with tiles, was added. Historic England List Entry Number: 1376164
19 Wall between Thimbleby's Tower and Old Newgate	53.18927°N 2.88822°W	I		A section of the walls about 198 feet (60 m) long, it is angled to follow the line of the inner rampart at the southeast corner of the Roman fortress. Historic England List Entry Number: 1376165
20 Old Newgate	53.18918°N 2.88831°W	II*		Dating from the early part of the 17th century, this is the earliest surviving post-medieval gateway in the city walls. It is constructed in sandstone, and contains a wrought iron gate with side-screens and an overthrow. Historic England List Entry Number: 1376378
21 Newgate	53.18902°N 2.88819°W	II		This was built in 1938 for the passage of a new road to ease traffic congestion in the city centre. The bridge carries the walkway above the road, accessed by two flights of steps. It was designed by Sir Walter Tapper and his son, Michael. Historic England List Entry Number: 1376379
22 Wall between Newgate and Barnaby's Tower	53.18860°N 2.88797°W	I		This section forms the extension to the south of the eastern wall added in the 11th–12th century. It is approximately 950 feet (290 m) long. Historic England List Entry Number: 1376167
23 Barnaby's Tower	53.18763°N 2.88750°W	I		Dating from the 13th century, the tower was damaged in the English Civil War. When the walkway was created in the 18th century it was converted to form a feature at the southeast corner of the walls, making its top level with the walkway. It is decorated with mock crenellation. Historic England List Entry Number: 1376168
24 Wall between Barnaby's Tower and the Drum Tower	53.18712°N 2.88781°W	I		Built partly on outcropping bedrock, this section of the walls is about 900 feet (274 m) long. It forms an embankment wall; the ground level on the north side is at the level of the walkway, and 24 feet (7 m) lower on the south side. Its eastern end is angled and contains six flights of three steps, known as the Wishing Steps. The Recorder's Steps lead down from this section. Historic England List Entry Number: 1376169
25 Recorder's Steps	53.18733°N 2.88746°W	I		The stairway consists of two flights of steps leading down the outside of the walls from the walkway to the Groves. They were built in 1720. An attached plaque erroneously states that they were constructed in 1700 for the Recorder of the time. Historic England List Entry Number: 1376170
26 Drum Tower	53.18637°N 2.88869°W	I		This is a semicircular projection from the walls to the south decorated with mock crenellation. It consists of the outer half of a former drum tower that was reduced in height to the level of the walkway in 1876–77. Historic England List Entry Number: 1376171
27 Wall between the Drum Tower and Bridgegate	53.18629°N 2.88896°W	I		Also forming an embankment wall, this short section is only about 165 feet (50 m) long. Historic England List Entry Number: 1376172
28 Bridgegate	53.18621°N 2.88928°W	I		Formerly the site of the gatehouse at the southern entrance to the medieval city, this bridge was built in 1781-82 in Neoclassical style. The design was by Joseph Turner. Immediately to the south the Old Dee Bridge crosses the River Dee. Bridgegate consists of a segmental arch over a central carriageway, with a round pedestrian archway in each abutment. Along its top are balustraded parapets on each side of the walkway. Historic England List Entry Number: 1376320
29 Wall between Bridgegate and the former County Hall	53.18606°N 2.88970°W	II*		This section of the walls leads down from the top of the Bridgegate to pavement level about 230 feet (70 m) to the west. It was built in 1781 when the old fortified gatehouse and a water tower were demolished. It was designed by Joseph Turner. In the 1830s it was realigned to improve the land around the county gaol. Historic England List Entry Number: 1376173
30 Wall between former County Hall and Grosvenor Road	53.18496°N 2.89345°W	I		A longer section, measuring about 1,640 feet (500 m), this contains the southwest angle of the walls. At the east end it was realigned with a section turning to the south, sloping down and carried over eleven arches to pavement level. This diversion was built in 1808–10 to accommodate the county gaol. At the other end, between the southwest angle and Grosvenor Road, is a round-arched opening containing a wrought iron gate constructed in 1885. Historic England List Entry Number: 1376174
31 Wall between Grosvenor Road and Watergate	53.18714°N 2.89599°W	I		On the east side of this section, the walkway is at the level of the adjoining road. The west side overlooks the Roodee and stands on a grassy embankment, with between 8 and 25 courses of masonry visible. Towards the north of this section is a 19th-century turret projecting to the west containing a stairway leading down to the racecourse. Immediately to the south of the Watergate is a double embrasure, perhaps part of the south tower of a former Watergate. Historic England List Entry Number: 1376175
32 Watergate	53.18936°N 2.89739°W	I		The Watergate was built between 1788 and 1790 for Chester City Council, replacing a medieval gate. It was designed by Joseph Turner. The bridge consists of a basket arch of short rusticated voussoirs. It has a parapet of stone balusters interspersed with panels. A drinking fountain dated 1857 is fixed to the north abutment. Historic England List Entry Number: 1376468
33 Wall between Watergate and Bonewaldesthorne's Tower	53.19086°N 2.89793°W	I		For much of its length this section of the walls is level with the walkway to the east. On the east side the stonework is approximately 18 courses high. Towards the north of the section, the wall was breached in the middle of the 19th century to form a bridge over the Chester and Holyhead Railway. Historic England List Entry Number: 1376176
