= Bridgegate, Chester =

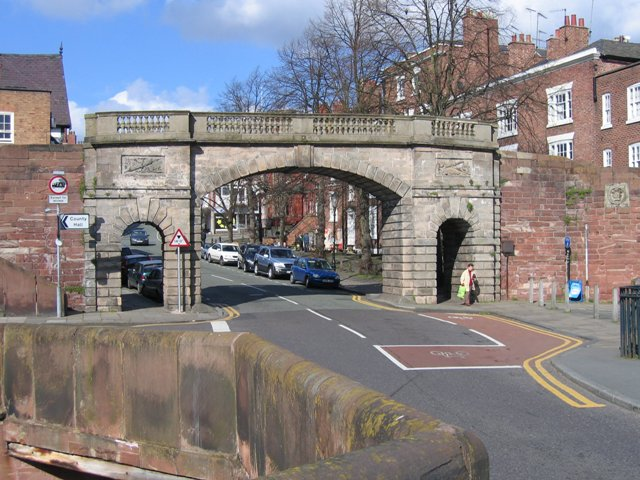
- Bridgegate from the south

- Location in Cheshire
- 53.1862°N 2.8893°W
- Location: Between Lower Bridge Street and the Old Dee Bridge, Chester, England
- OS grid reference: SJ 406 658

History
- Built: 1781
- Built for: Chester City Corporation

Site notes
- Architect: Joseph Turner
- Architectural style: Neoclassical

Listed Building – Grade I
- Designated: 28 July 1955
- Reference no.: 1376320

Bridgegate in Chester, Cheshire, England, forms part of the city walls. It is recorded in the National Heritage List for England as a designated Grade I listed building.

== History ==
The Roman city walls were extended to the south in the 12th century with a wall parallel to the north bank of the River Dee. This section of the wall incorporated the original Bridgegate which must have been built by the 1120s, as the office of sergeant of the gate was recorded in that decade. The gate guarded the southern entrance to the town; the road from North Wales ran through the gateway directly after crossing the Old Dee Bridge. It is possible that the gateway was rebuilt at the time the bridge was rebuilt in the later part of the 14th century. Between 1521 and 1624 the bridge tolls were controlled by the Talbot family, the Earls of Shrewsbury, whose town house, now the Bear and Billet, was nearby.

At the end of the 15th century the bridge consisted of a Gothic arch with a tower on each side. In 1600–01 a square tower was added which contained machinery for lifting river water into the town. This was known as John Tyrer's Water Tower, after its builder, but the tower was destroyed in the siege of Chester in 1644–65. The present bridge was built in 1781 for Chester City Corporation, the architect being Joseph Turner.

Map of central Chester, showing the line of the city walls and the gates, towers and wall sections of the medieval and post-medieval city.
[Hide/Show the list of Gates, Towers and Wall sections]
1 Bonewaldesthorne's Tower
2 Spur Wall and Water Tower
3 Wall between Bonewaldesthorne's Tower and Pemberton's Parlour
4 Pemberton's Parlour
5 Wall between Pemberton's Parlour and St Martin's Gate
6 St Martin's Gate
7 Wall between St Martin's Gate and Morgan's Mount
8 Morgan's Mount
9 Wall between Morgan's Mount and Northgate
10 Northgate
11 Wall between Northgate and Phoenix Tower
12 Phoenix Tower
13 Wall between Phoenix Tower and Kaleyard Gate
14 Kaleyard Gate
15 Wall between Kaleyard Gate and Eastgate
16 Eastgate
17 Wall between Eastgate and Thimbleby's Tower
18 Thimbleby's Tower
19 Wall between Thimbleby's Tower and Old Newgate
20 Old Newgate
21 Newgate
22 Wall between Newgate and Barnaby's Tower
23 Barnaby's Tower
24 Wall between Barnaby's Tower and the Drum Tower
25 Recorder's Steps
26 Drum Tower
27 Wall between the Drum Tower and Bridgegate
28 Bridgegate
29 Wall between Bridgegate and the former County Hall
30 Wall between former County Hall and Grosvenor Road
31 Wall between Grosvenor Road and Watergate
32 Watergate
33 Wall between Watergate and Bonewaldesthorne's Tower

== Architecture ==
Bridgegate is built in yellow sandstone ashlar in neoclassical style and consists of a segmental arch over the carriageway with a round pedestrian archway in each abutment. Along its top are balustraded parapets on each side of the footpath.

== See also ==
- Grade I listed buildings in Cheshire West and Chester
- Northgate, Chester
- Watergate, Chester
- Eastgate, Chester
