= Eastgate, Chester =

Grade I listed gate in Chester, England

Coordinates: 53°11′27″N 2°53′20″W

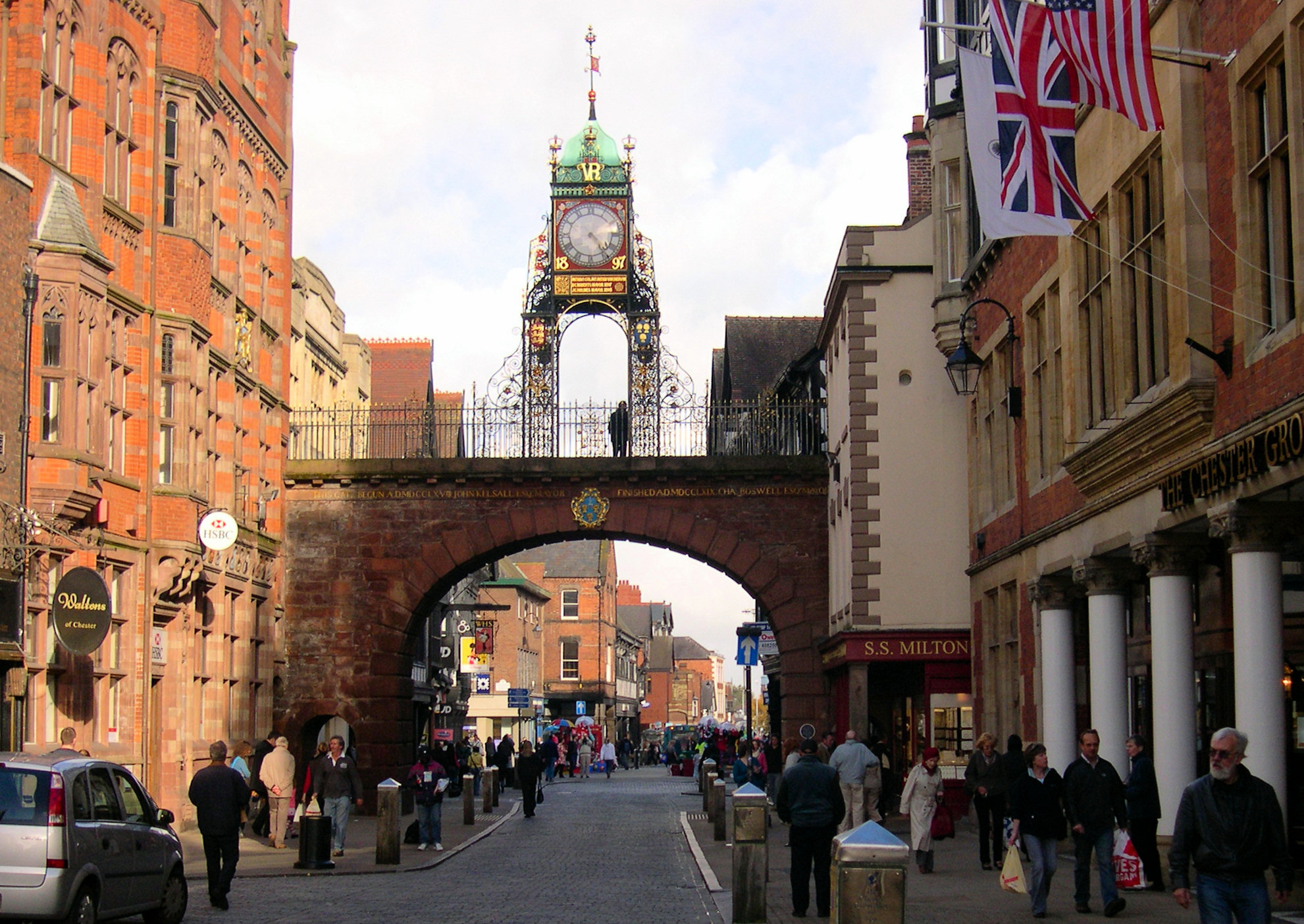
Eastgate and Eastgate Clock in 2007

Eastgate is a permanently open gate through the Chester city walls, on the site of the original entrance to the Roman fortress of Deva Victrix in Chester, Cheshire, England. It is a prominent landmark in the city of Chester and the Eastgate clock on top of it is said to be the most photographed clock in England after Big Ben.

The original gate was guarded by a timber tower which was replaced by a stone tower in the 2nd century, and this in turn was replaced probably in the 14th century. The present gateway dates from 1768 and is a three-arched sandstone structure which carries the walkway forming part of Chester city walls. In 1899 a clock was added to the top of the gateway to celebrate the diamond jubilee of Queen Victoria two years earlier. It is carried on openwork iron pylons, has a clock face on all four sides, and a copper ogee cupola. The clock was designed by the Chester architect John Douglas. The whole structure, gateway and clock, was designated as a Grade I listed building on 28 July 1955.

== Eastgate ==
=== History ===
Eastgate and Eastgate Clock
Map of central Chester, showing the line of the city walls and the gates, towers and wall sections of the medieval and post-medieval city.

[Hide/Show the list of Gates, Towers and Wall sections]
1 Bonewaldesthorne's Tower
2 Spur Wall and Water Tower
3 Wall between Bonewaldesthorne's Tower and Pemberton's Parlour
4 Pemberton's Parlour
5 Wall between Pemberton's Parlour and St Martin's Gate
6 St Martin's Gate
7 Wall between St Martin's Gate and Morgan's Mount
8 Morgan's Mount
9 Wall between Morgan's Mount and Northgate
10 Northgate
11 Wall between Northgate and Phoenix Tower
12 Phoenix Tower
13 Wall between Phoenix Tower and Kaleyard Gate
14 Kaleyard Gate
15 Wall between Kaleyard Gate and Eastgate
16 Eastgate
17 Wall between Eastgate and Thimbleby's Tower
18 Thimbleby's Tower
19 Wall between Thimbleby's Tower and Old Newgate
20 Old Newgate
21 Newgate
22 Wall between Newgate and Barnaby's Tower
23 Barnaby's Tower
24 Wall between Barnaby's Tower and the Drum Tower
25 Recorder's Steps
26 Drum Tower
27 Wall between the Drum Tower and Bridgegate
28 Bridgegate
29 Wall between Bridgegate and the former County Hall
30 Wall between former County Hall and Grosvenor Road
31 Wall between Grosvenor Road and Watergate
32 Watergate
33 Wall between Watergate and Bonewaldesthorne's Tower

Chester was first established as a Roman fortress and town, known as Deva Victrix, in about AD 74 or 75. The fortress was in the shape of a rectangle with rounded corners. This was protected by a turf and earth rampart on which was a timber palisade, and outside this was a V-shaped ditch. On each of the sides was a gate; the gate on the east side has survived as the Eastgate. It was defended by a timber tower. The road running through the gate led to Manchester, then across the Pennines to York. It is thought that outside the fortress this road was lined by timber buildings that were used as shops or for other kinds of commercial activities. Just outside the gate, to the north, was a large open area used as a parade ground. From about AD 100 the defences of the fortress were reinforced by a sandstone wall and at this time the gates and their towers were rebuilt in stone.

In 907 the Saxon kings of Wessex refounded Chester as a burh. It is likely that at this time the Roman Eastgate was still present. By the medieval period the Eastgate was the most important entrance to the city. The Roman Eastgate had been replaced but the date of the replacement is not known. Its design was possibly influenced by Caernarvon Castle, which makes the early 14th century the most likely date for its construction. It consisted of a tall rectangular tower with octagonal corner turrets. At its flanks were lower towers that also had octagonal turrets. During an excavation in 1971 a portion of the northern flanking turret was found, consisting of cream-coloured sandstone (in contrast to the red sandstone normally used in Chester).

Outside the Eastgate, excavations in 1991 revealed the presence of three ditches. The ditch made during the Saxon period was wide but shallow, being only a little over 3 feet (1 m) in depth. It had been filled with rubble and masonry. The next ditch was deeper, 7.5 feet (2 m) deep, and this may have been constructed when the new Eastgate was built, probably in the 14th century. The third ditch was built during the later medieval period, probably to assist with drainage. The two later ditches were later used for the disposal of rubbish and became waterlogged, so that they contained organic materials that do not normally survive well in Chester.

By the 18th century the city walls were no longer needed for defensive purposes and so, rather than being pulled down, they were converted into walkways. The medieval gateways were obstructing the traffic into the city and were replaced by wider-arched gateways with balustraded parapets. The first gateway to be replaced was Eastgate in 1768, which was rebuilt as an "elegant arch". It was built at the expense of Richard Grosvenor, 1st Earl Grosvenor, and designed by Mr Hayden (or Heyden), the earl's surveyor of buildings.

=== Architecture ===
Eastgate is built in red sandstone and consists of a wide central arch, with rusticated jambs and voussoirs, and a small pedestrian arch on each side. On the inner keystone are the arms of the county palatine, a sword of justice and three sheaves. On this side of the gateway is a frieze-band with an inscription reading "THIS GATE BEGUN MDCCLXVIII JOHN KELSAL ESQ. MAYOR: FINISHED MDCCLXIX CHA. BOSWELL ESQ. MAYOR". The outer keystone has the arms of Richard Grosvenor with the motto "NOBILITATE VIRTUS NON STEMMA CHARACTER". The frieze-band inscription reads "ERECTED AT THE EXPENCE OF RICHARD LORD GROSVENOR A:D:MDCCLXIX". The walkway that forms part of the circuit of the city walls crosses the top of Eastgate, which is surmounted by the Victorian clock.

== Eastgate Clock ==
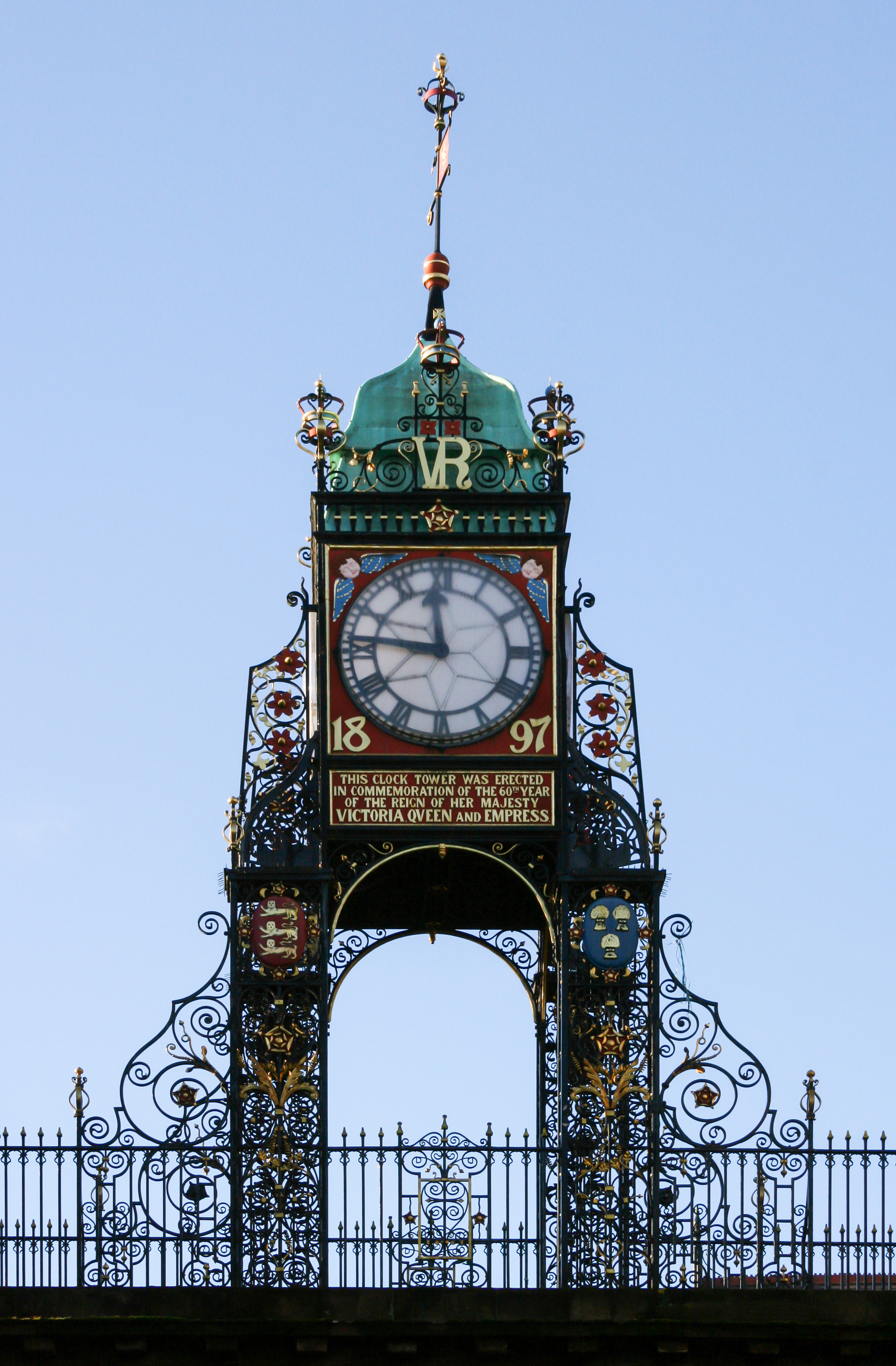
Eastgate Clock

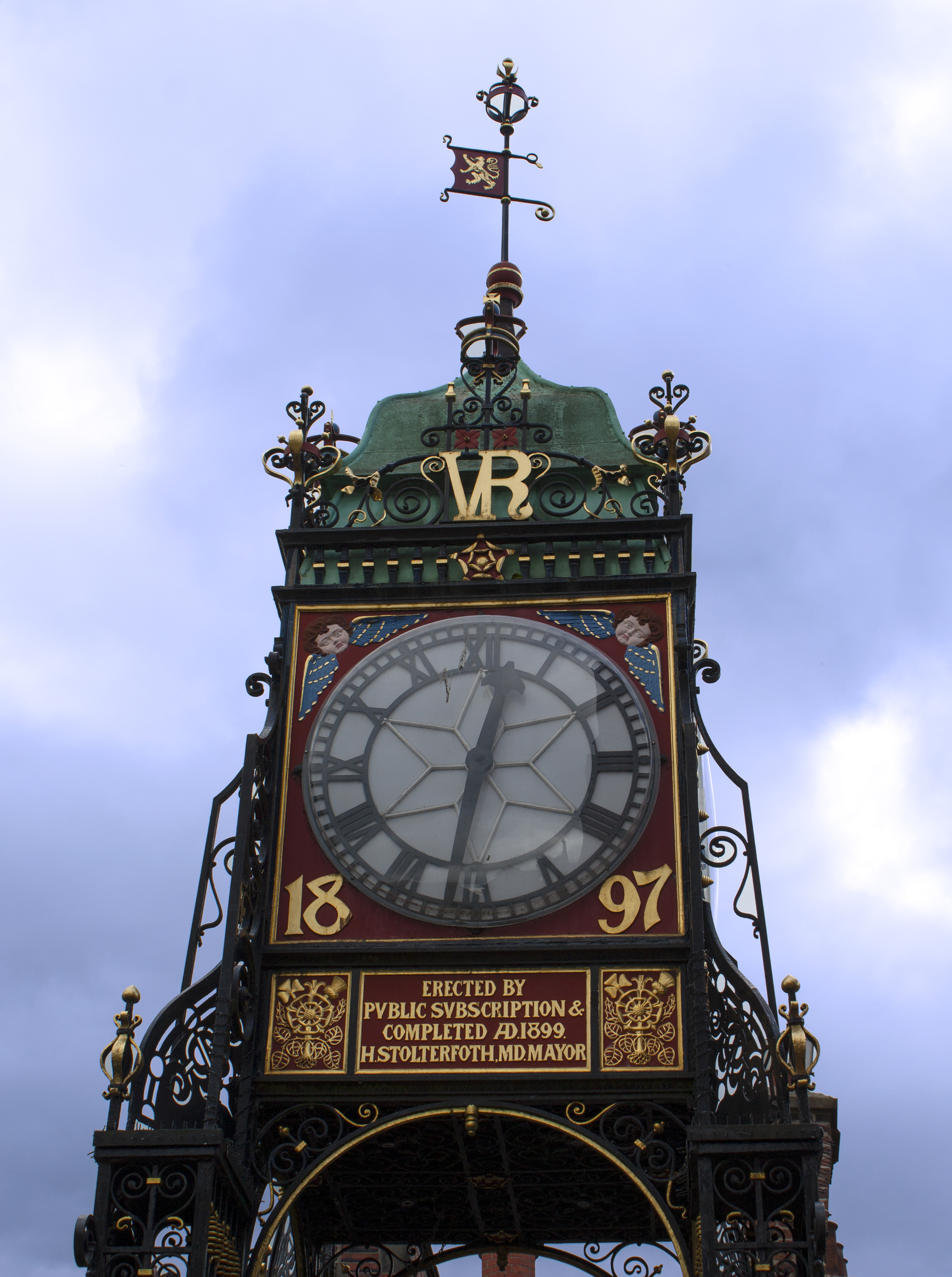
Closeup of Eastgate Clock

=== History ===
The first scheme to enhance Eastgate came following the visit of the Prince of Wales to the city in 1869. In 1872 Hugh Grosvenor, who was at that time the 3rd Marquess of Westminster, asked the local architect John Douglas to prepare a number of designs. The Marquess offered to pay half the cost of the project but the Chester Improvement Committee would not allow any council funds for it, and the scheme came to nothing. The idea was revived to celebrate the diamond jubilee of Queen Victoria in 1896. At this time the 1st Duke of Westminster suggested that the city should support Queen Victoria's Jubilee Institute of Nurses. Other ideas suggested at the time were a statue of Queen Victoria in the Town Hall square, or a clock in the Town Hall tower.

A committee was set up and, despite early support for the Queen's Institute and for general festivities, it was finally decided to erect a memorial tower and clock on Eastgate. John Douglas was again invited to prepare a design. His first design was for a stone structure costing £1,000 (equivalent to £143,000 in 2023). However, a wooden model showed that this would restrict the daylight to the neighbouring properties. In October 1897 a meeting of the subscribers to the fund (who had by that time raised nearly £651 (equivalent to £93,000 in 2023) carried a motion to erect a light iron-work structure containing a clock. John Douglas prepared a new design, which was approved in March 1898.

The clock's faces and mechanism were paid for by Edward Evans-Lloyd, a local solicitor and freeman of the city, while the cost of the tower was financed by public subscription, and the city corporation were to pay for its subsequent maintenance. The clock mechanism was made in 1897 by J. B. Joyce & Company of Whitchurch, Shropshire, who until 1974 supplied a technician to travel to Chester each week to wind it. The cast iron inscriptions on the clock were made by the Coalbrookdale Iron Company. The ironwork for the tower was made by the firm of James Swindley of Handbridge; James Swindley was John Douglas's cousin. The official opening of the clock was performed on 27 May 1899, Queen Victoria's 80th birthday.

After souvenir-hunters stole the hands of the clock, the city council glazed the clock faces in 1988. In 1992 an electric mechanism replaced the original wind-up mechanism. In 1996 the clock faces were restored with their original colours. It is said to be the most photographed clock in England after Big Ben.

=== Architecture ===
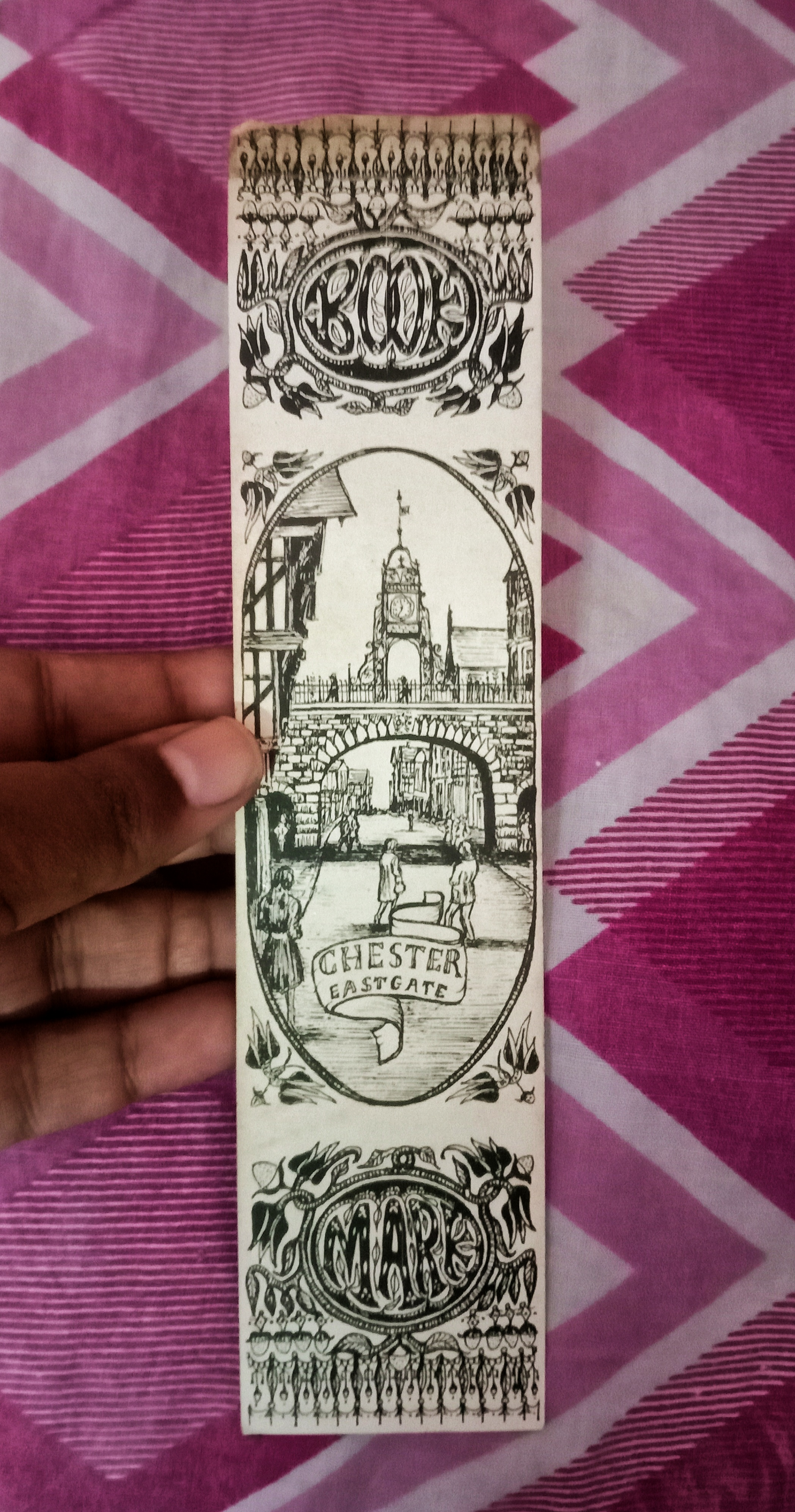
A vintage book mark commemorating the historic Chester Eastgate of Cheshire

The clock has a face on each of its four sides, and is supported on an open-work wrought iron pavilion on pylons with a round arch on each side. Its plinth is inscribed on each face. The inscription on the east side reads "THIS CLOCK TOWER WAS ERECTED IN COMMEMORATION OF THE 60TH YEAR OF THE REIGN OF VICTORIA, QUEEN AND EMPRESS", on the west side "ANTIQUI COLANT ANTIQUUM DIERUM: B.C. ROBERTS, MAYOR 1897; J.C. HOLMES, MAYOR 1898", on the south side "THIS CLOCK WAS ERECTED BY EDWARD EVANS-LLOYD CITIZEN AND FREEMAN 1897", and on the north side "ERECTED BY PUBLIC SUBSCRIPTION & COMPLETED A.D. 1899 H. STOLTEFORTH MAYOR". Beneath each clock face in gilt is the date 1897, and above each face, again in gilt, the initials "VR". Over the clock is a copper ogee cupola which is surmounted by a weather vane with lions rampant or on gules background.

== See also ==
- Grade I listed buildings in Cheshire West and Chester
- List of non-ecclesiastical and non-residential works by John Douglas
- Northgate, Chester
- Bridgegate, Chester
