= Watergate, Chester =

Bridge in Chester, Cheshire, England

Watergate
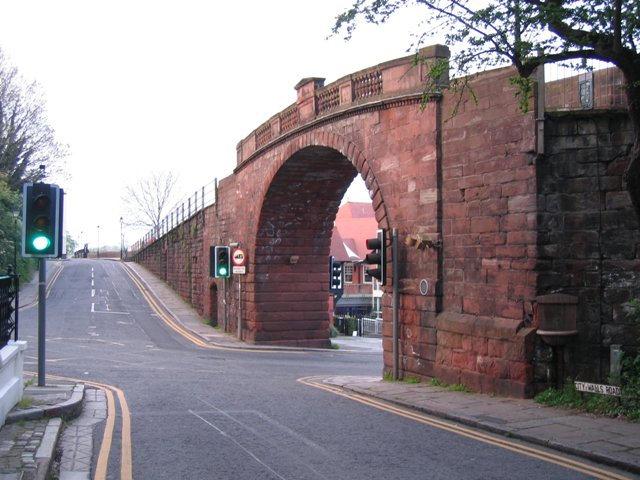
- Watergate
- Coordinates: 53.1894°N 2.8974°W
- Carries: City wall
- Crosses: A458
- Locale: Chester, Cheshire
- Heritage status: Grade I listed

Characteristics
- Design: Arch bridge
- Material: Sandstone

History
- Designer: Joseph Turner
- Opened: 1790

Statistics
- Toll: None

Listed Building – Grade I
- Official name: The Watergate
- Designated: 28 July 1955
- Reference no.: 1376468

Location
- Interactive map of Watergate

The Watergate is in Chester, Cheshire, England and spans the A548 road between Watergate Street and New Crane Street (grid reference SJ402662). It forms part of the city walls and carries a footpath over the road. It is recorded in the National Heritage List for England as a designated Grade I listed building.

Watergate was built between 1788 and 1790 for Chester City Council and replaced a medieval gate that had been damaged during the siege of Chester. The architect was Joseph Turner. It is built in red sandstone ashlar and consists of a basket arch of short rusticated voussoirs. The parapet consists of stone balusters interspersed with panels. A drinking fountain, which is now dry, is fixed to the north abutment and is dated 1857.

Map of central Chester, showing the line of the city walls and the gates, towers and wall sections of the medieval and post-medieval city.
[Hide/Show the list of Gates, Towers and Wall sections]
1 Bonewaldesthorne's Tower
2 Spur Wall and Water Tower
3 Wall between Bonewaldesthorne's Tower and Pemberton's Parlour
4 Pemberton's Parlour
5 Wall between Pemberton's Parlour and St Martin's Gate
6 St Martin's Gate
7 Wall between St Martin's Gate and Morgan's Mount
8 Morgan's Mount
9 Wall between Morgan's Mount and Northgate
10 Northgate
11 Wall between Northgate and Phoenix Tower
12 Phoenix Tower
13 Wall between Phoenix Tower and Kaleyard Gate
14 Kaleyard Gate
15 Wall between Kaleyard Gate and Eastgate
16 Eastgate
17 Wall between Eastgate and Thimbleby's Tower
18 Thimbleby's Tower
19 Wall between Thimbleby's Tower and Old Newgate
20 Old Newgate
21 Newgate
22 Wall between Newgate and Barnaby's Tower
23 Barnaby's Tower
24 Wall between Barnaby's Tower and the Drum Tower
25 Recorder's Steps
26 Drum Tower
27 Wall between the Drum Tower and Bridgegate
28 Bridgegate
29 Wall between Bridgegate and the former County Hall
30 Wall between former County Hall and Grosvenor Road
31 Wall between Grosvenor Road and Watergate
32 Watergate
33 Wall between Watergate and Bonewaldesthorne's Tower

== See also ==
- Grade I listed buildings in Cheshire West and Chester
- Bridgegate, Chester
- Northgate, Chester
