= Northgate, Chester =

Northgate
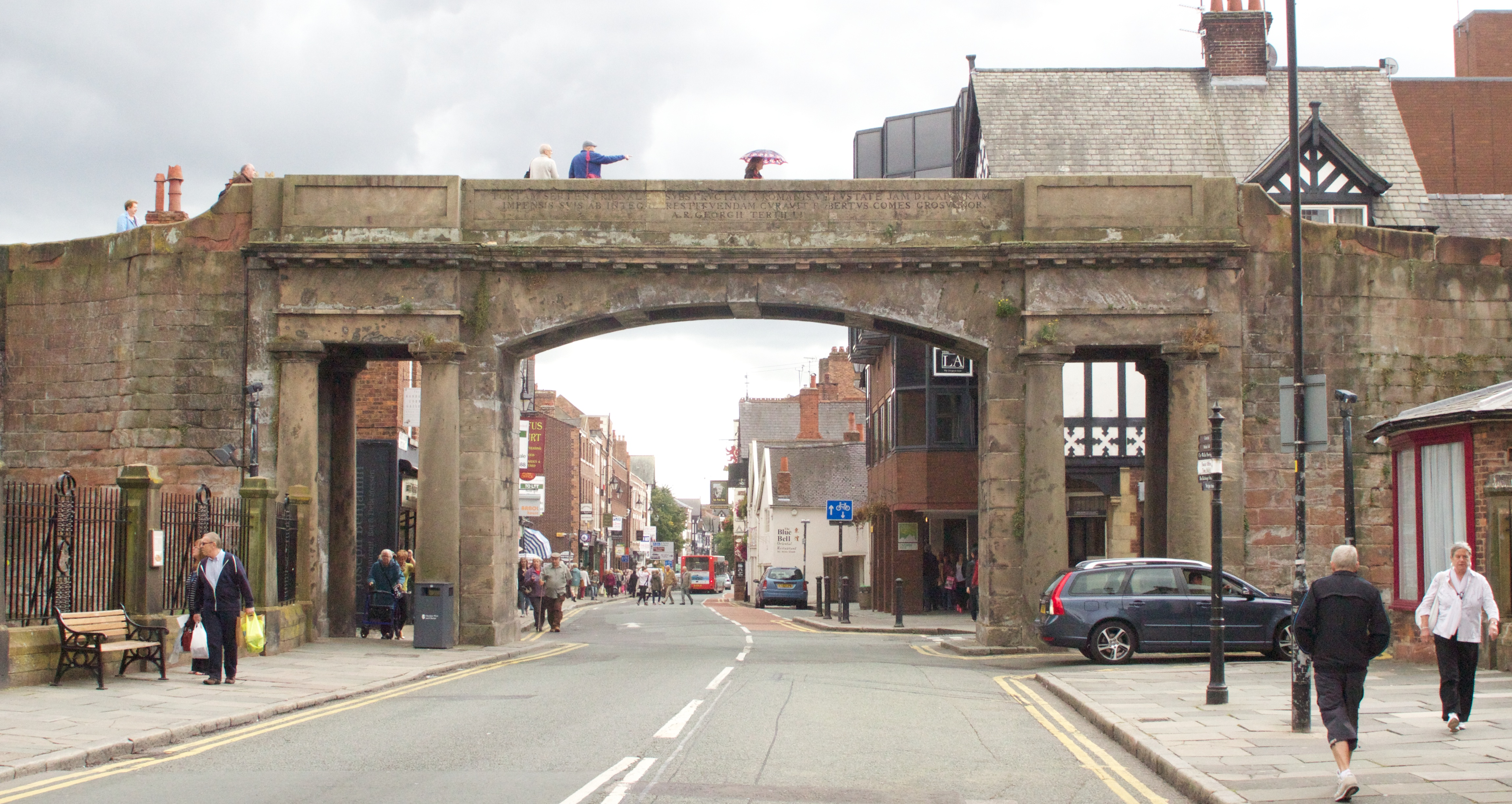
- Northgate
- Coordinates: 53.193822°N 2.893366°W
- Carries: Chester city walls
- Crosses: Northgate Street
- Locale: Chester, Cheshire, England

Characteristics
- Design: Arch bridge
- Material: Sandstone

History
- Designer: Thomas Harrison
- Opened: 1810

Statistics
- Toll: None

Location
- Interactive map of Northgate

Map of central Chester, showing the line of the city walls and the gates, towers and wall sections of the medieval and post-medieval city.
[Hide/Show the list of Gates, Towers and Wall sections]
1 Bonewaldesthorne's Tower
2 Spur Wall and Water Tower
3 Wall between Bonewaldesthorne's Tower and Pemberton's Parlour
4 Pemberton's Parlour
5 Wall between Pemberton's Parlour and St Martin's Gate
6 St Martin's Gate
7 Wall between St Martin's Gate and Morgan's Mount
8 Morgan's Mount
9 Wall between Morgan's Mount and Northgate
10 Northgate
11 Wall between Northgate and Phoenix Tower
12 Phoenix Tower
13 Wall between Phoenix Tower and Kaleyard Gate
14 Kaleyard Gate
15 Wall between Kaleyard Gate and Eastgate
16 Eastgate
17 Wall between Eastgate and Thimbleby's Tower
18 Thimbleby's Tower
19 Wall between Thimbleby's Tower and Old Newgate
20 Old Newgate
21 Newgate
22 Wall between Newgate and Barnaby's Tower
23 Barnaby's Tower
24 Wall between Barnaby's Tower and the Drum Tower
25 Recorder's Steps
26 Drum Tower
27 Wall between the Drum Tower and Bridgegate
28 Bridgegate
29 Wall between Bridgegate and the former County Hall
30 Wall between former County Hall and Grosvenor Road
31 Wall between Grosvenor Road and Watergate
32 Watergate
33 Wall between Watergate and Bonewaldesthorne's Tower

The Northgate is a gate located in Chester, Cheshire, England, where it carries the city walls footpath over Northgate Street (grid reference SJ404666). It is recorded in the National Heritage List for England as a designated Grade I listed building.

== History ==
The present Northgate stands on the site of the original northern Roman entrance to Chester. During the medieval period, it was unimportant and it was used only for local access. At that time it consisted of a simple rectangular tower with a narrow gateway. It later was the site of the local gaol. The present Northgate was built in 1810 to replace a medieval gatehouse and was designed by Thomas Harrison for Chester City Council.

== Architecture ==
It is built in pale red sandstone ashlar and consists of a segmental arch with a coffered soffit which spans the carriageway. On each side of the arch is a rectangular portal for the pavement. On both sides of the portals are attached unfluted monolithic Doric half-columns at each corner. Across the top of the structure is a dentilled cornice which carries a panelled parapet. In constructing Northgate, Harrison used "as few and as huge stones as possible".

== See also ==
- Grade I listed buildings in Cheshire West and Chester
- List of works by Thomas Harrison
- Bridgegate, Chester
- Eastgate, Chester
