= Timeline of English history =

List of significant events in the history of England

This is a timeline of English history, comprising important legal and territorial changes and political events in England and its predecessor states. To read about the background to these events, see History of England.

== 1st century BC ==
Year	Date	Event
55 BC		Roman general Julius Caesar invades for the first time, gaining a beachhead on the coast of Kent.
54 BC		Caesar invades a second time. These two invasions are known as Caesar's invasions of Britain.

== 1st century ==
Year	Date	Event
c.10–c.40		Reign of Cuno, an influential king of southern England before the Roman occupation; son of Tasciovanus
43		Aulus Plautius leads an army of forty thousand to invade Great Britain; Emperor Claudius makes it a part of the Roman Empire
c. 47 – 50		London settled by the Romans, known as Londinium

== 2nd century ==
Year	Date	Event
122 – 128		Emperor Hadrian orders a 73-mile (117 km) wall built to mark the Northern Roman Empire's province on the British Isle. Hadrian's Wall, as it comes to be known, is intended to keep the Caledonians, Picts, and other tribes at bay.

== 3rd century ==
Year	Date	Event
c. 213		Britain is divided into two provinces, Britannia Inferior and Britannia Superior. This is likely due to the Roman emperor at the time, Caracalla.
286		Marcus Aurelius Mausaeus Carausius, a Roman military commander at the time, usurps power during the Carausian Revolt.

== 4th century ==
Year	Date	Event
367		The Great Conspiracy begins, starting a year-long period of disorder and war in Britain.

== 5th century ==
Year	Date	Event
401		Romans begin their withdrawal from Britain.
449		The Angles begin their invasion of England and establish tribal kingdoms on the east coast.

== 6th century ==
Year	Date	Event
597		Christianisation of the Kingdom of Kent and its leader King Æthelberht by Saint Augustine.

== 7th century ==
Year	Date	Event
616	24 February	King Æthelberht of Kent dies and is succeeded by his son Eadbald of Kent.

== 8th century ==
Year	Date	Event
740-756		Reign of Cuthred, King of Wessex.
757		Offa becomes King of Mercia.
793	8 June	Viking raid on a monastery in Lindisfarne, often taken as the beginning of the Viking age.
796	29 July	Offa of Mercia dies.

== 9th century ==
Year	Date	Event
802		Ecgberht of Wessex is enthroned.
849		Alfred the Great, the future king of Wessex (r. 871-899), is born to Aethelwulf of Wessex and Osburh.
865		Arrival of the Great Heathen Army.
871	April	Alfred the Great succeeds his brother Æthelred as King of the West Saxons.
874		Edward the Elder, the future king of England (r. 899-924), is born to Alfred the Great and Ealhswith.
894		Æthelstan the Glorious, the future king of England (r. 927-939), is born to Edward the Elder and Ecgwynn.

== 10th century ==
Year	Date	Event
921		Edmund the Magnificent, the future king of England (r. 939-946), is born to Edward the Elder and Eadgifu of Kent.
923		Eadred, the future king of England (r. 946-955), is born to Edward the Elder and Eadgifu of Kent.
924		Æthelstan becomes king of England.
940		Eadwig All-Fair, the future king of England (r. 955-959), is born to Edmund I and Ælfgifu of Shaftesbury.
943		Edgar the Peaceful, the future king of England (r. 959-975), is born to Edmund I and Ælfgifu of Shaftesbury.
962		Edward the Martyr, the future king of England (r. 975-978) is born to Edgar the Peaceful and Æthelflæd.
963	17 April	Sweyn Forkbeard, the future king of England (r. 1013-1014), is born in Denmark to Harald Bluetooth and either Tove or Gunhild.
966		Æthelred the Unready, the future king of England (r. 978~1013), is born to Edgar the Peaceful and Ælfthryth.
990		Edmund Ironside, the future king of England (r. 1016-1016), is born to Æthelred and Ælfgifu of York.
991		Earl Byrhtnoth and his thegns lead the English against a Viking invasion in the Battle of Maldon in Essex.
995		Cnut the Great, the future king of England (r.1016-1035), is born to Sweyn Forkbeard and Gunhilda of Poland.

== 11th century ==
Year	Date	Event
1003		Edward the Confessor, the future king of England (r. 1042-1066), is born to Æthelred the Unready and Emma of Normandy.
1016		Harold Harefoot, the future king of England (r.1035-1040), is born to Cnut the Great and Ælfgifu of Northhampton.
1016		Cnut the Great of Denmark becomes king of all England
1018		Harthacnut, the future king of England, (r. 1040-1042), is born to Cnut the Great and Emma of Normandy.
1022		Harold II, the future king of England (r. 1066-1066), is born to Godwin of Wessex and Gytha Thorkelsdóttir.
1028		William the Conqueror, the future king of England (r.1066-1087), is born to Robert the Magnificent and Herleva.
1042		Edward the Confessor becomes king of all England
1054		The Great Schism, culmination of theological and political differences between Eastern and Western Christianity
1056		William II, the future king of England (r. 1087-1100), is born to William the Conqueror and Matilda of Flanders.
1066		Battle of Fulford: English forces are defeated by Norse invaders in northeastern England.
1066		Battle of Stamford Bridge: the remaining Norse under Harald Hardrada are defeated by the bulk of England's army under the command of its king.
1066		Battle of Hastings: England's remaining forces defeated by invaders from Normandy, known as the Norman Conquest; William the Conqueror crowned king of England.
1068		Henry I, the future king of England (r.1100-1135), is born to William the Conqueror and Matilda of Flanders.
1086		Work commences on the Domesday Book.
1096		Stephen of Blois, the future king of England (r. 1135-1154), is born to Stephen, Count of Blois, and Adela of Normandy.

== 12th century ==
Year	Date	Event
1120		White Ship disaster
1133	5 March	Henry II, the future king of England (r. 1154-1189), is born in Le Mans, France, to Geoffrey V of Anjou and Matilda.
1135		The Anarchy, a civil war resulting from a dispute over succession to the throne, begins; it lasts until 1153.
1138		The Battle of the Standard: the English defeat an invading Scottish army led by King David I.
1157	8 September	Richard the Lionheart, the future king of England (r. 1189-1199), is born to Henry II and Elanor of Aquitaine.
1164		The Constitutions of Clarendon, a set of laws which governed the trial of members of the Catholic Church in England, are issued.
1166	24 December	John Lackland, the future king of England (r. 1199-1216), is born to Henry II and Elanor of Aquitaine.
1170		Thomas Becket, the Archbishop of Canterbury, is assassinated.
1192		Crusades: King Richard I is captured by Austrian Duke Leopold V, Duke of Austria while returning from the Holy Land.
1194		Richard is ransomed and returned to England.

== 13th century ==
Year	Date	Event
1207	1 October	Henry III, the future king of England (r. 1216-1272), is born to John and Isabella of Angoulême.
1209		King John is excommunicated from the Catholic Church by Pope Innocent III.
1214		The English are defeated in Battle of Bouvinnes.
1215		Magna Carta is signed.
1237		The Treaty of York is signed, fixing the border between Scotland and England.
1239	17 June	Edward I, the future king of England (r. 1272-1307), is born to Henry III and Elanor of Provence.
1264		Battle of Lewes: Rebel English barons led by Simon de Montfort, 6th Earl of Leicester defeat King Henry III.
1267		Henry recognises the authority of Llywelyn ap Gruffudd in Gwynedd.
1277		England annexes Gwynedd.
1279		The Statute of Mortmain is issued.
1284	25 April	Edward II, the future king of England (r. 1307-1327), is born to Edward I and Elanor of Castile.
1287		Rhys ap Maredudd leads a revolt against English rule in Wales.
1294		Madog ap Llywelyn leads a revolt against English rule in Wales.
1297		Battle of Stirling Bridge: The Scots, led by William Wallace, defeats the English.

== 14th century ==
Year	Date	Event
1305	23 August	William Wallace is executed by the English on a charge of treason.
1312	13 November	Edward III, the future king of England (r. 1327-1377), is born to Edward II and Isabella of France.
1314	23–24 June	Battle of Bannockburn: Scotland wins a decisive victory over England.
1328	1 May	The Treaty of Edinburgh–Northampton, under which England recognises Scottish independence, is signed.
1348		The Black Death arrives in England.
1356	19 September	Battle of Poitiers: Second of the three major battles of the Hundred Years' War takes place near Poitiers, France.
1367	6 January	Richard II, the future king of England (r. 1377-1399), is born to Edward the Black Prince and Joan of Kent.
1367	April	Henry IV, the future king of England (r. 1399-1413), is born to John of Gaunt and Blanche of Lancaster.
1373	16 June	The Anglo-Portuguese Treaty of 1373 is signed, forming an alliance between England and Portugal; it remains an active treaty, most recently invoked in the Falklands War (see 1982)
1381	May–June	Peasants' Revolt: a major uprising across large parts of England led by Wat Tyler; it is also called Wat Tyler's Rebellion or the Great Rising.
1386	16 September	Henry V, the future king of England (r. 1413-1422), is born to Henry IV and Mary de Bohun.
1395		The Statute of Praemunire is issued.

== 15th century ==
Year	Date	Event
1403	21 July	Battle of Shrewsbury: fought between the Lancastrian King, Henry IV, and a rebel army led by Henry "Harry Hotspur" Percy from Northumberland.
1415	25 October	Battle of Agincourt: a major English victory in the Hundred Years' War on Saint Crispin's Day, near modern-day Azincourt, in northern France.
1421	6 December	Henry VI, the future king of England (r. 1422–1471), is born to Henry V and Catherine of Valois.
1442	28 April	Edward IV, the future king of England (r. 1461–1470), is born to Richard of York and Cecily Neville.
1452	2 October	Richard III, the future king of England (r. 1483-1485), is born to Richard of York and Cecily Neville.
1455	22 May	The start of the Wars of the Roses, a civil war for control of the throne of England between the House of York in Yorkshire and House of Lancaster in Lancashire.
1457	28 January	Henry VII, the future king of England (r. 1485-1509), is born to Edmund Tudor and Margaret Beaufort.
1485	22 August	Battle of Bosworth Field (Battle of Bosworth): the last significant battle of the Wars of the Roses, the civil war between the Houses of Lancaster and York. Richard III, the last Plantagenet king was killed, succeeded by Henry VII.
1487	16 June	Battle of Stoke, the decisive engagement in a failed attempt by leading Yorkists to unseat Henry VII of England in favour of the pretender Lambert Simnel.
1470	2 November	Edward V, the future king of England (r. 1483-1483), is born to Edward IV and Elizabeth Woodville.
1491	28 June	Henry VIII, the future king of England (r. 1509-1547), is born to Henry VII and Elizabeth of York.

== 16th century ==
Year	Date	Event
1513		Battle of Flodden Field: Invading England, King James IV of Scotland and thousands of other Scots are killed in a defeat at the hands of the English.
1516	18 February	Mary I, the future queen of England (r. 1553-1558), is born to Henry VIII and Catherine of Aragon.
1521		Lutheran writings begin to circulate in England.
1527	21 May	Phillip II, the future king of England (r. 1554-1558), is born to Charles V of the Holy Roman Empire and Isabella of Portugal.
1526		Thomas Wolsey, the Lord Chancellor and a Cardinal, orders the burning of Lutheran books.
1533		King Henry VIII severs ties with the Catholic Church and declares himself head of the church in England.
1533	7 September	Elizabeth I, the future queen of England (r. 1558-1603), is born to Henry VIII and Anne Boleyn.
1534		Henry VIII issues the Act of Supremacy.
1534		Henry VIII issues the Treasons Act 1534.
1535		Thomas More and Cardinal John Fisher are executed.
1536		William Tyndale is executed in Antwerp.
1536		Henry VIII orders the Dissolution of the Monasteries.
1537	12 October	Edward VI, the future king of England (r. 1547-1553), is born to Henry VIII and Jane Seymour.
1549		Prayer Book Rebellion: A rebellion in the southwest.
1550		England and France sign the Peace of Boulogne.
1553		The Act Against Sectaries 1553 is issued.
1558		Elizabeth I claims the throne of England and rules until 1603.
1559		The Act of Supremacy 1559 is issued.
1566	19 June	James I, the future king of England (r. 1603-1625), is born to Henry Stuart and Mary I.
1571		The Treasons Act 1571 is issued.
1571		The Act Prohibiting Papal Bulls from Rome 1571 is issued.
1585		The Roanoke Colony is founded in America.
1588	8 August	The Spanish Armada is destroyed.
1589		The English Armada, or Counter Armada, is defeated by Spain.
1593		The Act Against Papists 1593 is issued.

== 17th century ==
Year	Date	Event
1600	19 November	Charles I, the future king of England (r. 1625-1649), is born to James I and Anne of Denmark.
1601		Catholic plot against the Earl of Essex includes some of the plotters from the Gunpowder Plot.
1603		King James VI of Scotland ascends to the English throne, becoming James I of England and uniting the crowns – but not the parliaments – of the two kingdoms.
1605	5 November	Gunpowder Plot: A plot in which Guy Fawkes and other Catholic associates conspired to blow up King James VI and I and the Parliament of England, is uncovered.
1607	14 May	Jamestown is founded in the Virginia Colony and is the first permanent English colony in America.
1611		Henry Hudson dies.
1618	29 October	Walter Raleigh is executed.
1630	29 May	Charles II, the future king of England (r. 1660-1685), is born to Charles I and Henrietta Maria of France.
1633	14 October	James II, the future king of England (r. 1685-1688), is born to Charles I and Henrietta Maria of France.
1639		Bishops' Wars: A war with Scotland begins, lasting until 1640.
1640		Long Parliament: The Parliament is convened.
1642		The English Civil War begins (see timeline of the English Civil War).
1649	January	Trial and execution of Charles I
1649		Interregnum begins with the First Commonwealth.
1650	4 November	William III, the future king of England (r. 1689-1702), is born to William II of Orange and Mary of England.
1653–1659		The Protectorate under the Lord Protector Oliver Cromwell and later (1658) his son Richard Cromwell.
1659		The Second Commonwealth under Richard Cromwell brings with it a period of great political instability.
1660		Restoration of the monarchy: After a chaotic short revival of the Commonwealth of England, the monarchy is restored in May, after agreeing to the Declaration of Breda, largely through the initiative of General George Monck.
1662	30 April	Mary II, the future queen of England (r. 1689-1694), is born to James II and Anne Hyde.
1665	6 February	Anne, the future queen of England (r. 1702-1707), is born to James II and Anne Hyde.
1666	2–5 September	Great Fire of London
1688		Glorious Revolution: Also called the Revolution of 1688: the overthrow of James II by a union of English Parliamentarians with William III of Orange-Nassau (William of Orange), a stadtholder in the Dutch Republic, and his wife Mary II.
1694	27 July	The Bank of England is founded.
1698	2 July	English engineer Thomas Savery patents the first steam engine.

== 18th century ==
Year	Date	Event
1701		The Act of Settlement 1701, which requires the English monarch to be Protestant, is passed.
1702	8 March	William III dies and is succeeded by Anne.
1704	4 August	Gibraltar is captured by a combined Dutch and English fleet under the command of George Rooke, Admiral of the Fleet.
1704	13 August	Battle of Blenheim: A combined English and Dutch army under the command of John Churchill, 1st Duke of Marlborough defeats the French army in Bavaria.
1706	22 July	The Treaty of Union is agreed between representatives of the Parliament of England and the Parliament of Scotland.
1707		The Acts of Union 1707 are passed in the Parliament of England and Parliament of Scotland, ratifying the Treaty of Union.
1715		The Old Dock, originally known as Thomas Steers' dock, becomes the world's first commercial wet dock.
1744		An attempted French invasion of southern England is stopped by storms.
1756		Following the start of the French and Indian War two years prior, the Seven Years' War begins.
1763	10 Feb	The Treaty of Paris (1763) is signed, formally ending the Seven Years' War. France renounces a large portion of North American land to Great Britain.
1765		William Blackstone publishes his first volume of Commentaries on the Laws of England.
1775	19 April	War of American Independence starts with the Battles of Lexington and Concord in Massachusetts. The Thirteen Colonies unite and declare independence in 1776. American alliance with France in 1778, joined by Spain in 1779. Britain fights without European allies. War lasts until 1783.
1790s		Canal Mania, an intense period of canal building in England and Wales.
1797	22–25 July	Admiral Horatio Nelson suffers his worst defeat in Battle of Santa Cruz de Tenerife (1797) and loses most of his right arm from a musket ball whilst fighting against Canarian militias.

== 19th century ==
Year	Date	Event
1805		Battle of Trafalgar: Horatio Nelson defeats the French at Trafalgar, establishing British naval supremacy over the world's oceans for approximately 140 years.
1819	16 August	Peterloo Massacre: about 18 people killed and several hundred injured in Manchester when a large cavalry charge demonstration demanding parliamentary representation reform breaks out.
1830	15 September	The Liverpool and Manchester Railway becomes the first inter-city railway in the world. (Note: The Stockton and Darlington Railway opened in 1825, but sections of this line employed cable haulage, and only the coal trains were hauled by locomotives. The Canterbury and Whitstable Railway, opened in May 1830, was also mostly cable hauled. Horse-drawn traffic, including passenger services, used the railway upon payment of a toll.) It opens on 15 September 1830 and runs between the Lancashire towns of Liverpool and Manchester.
1834		The Tolpuddle Martyrs are arrested, tried, and sentenced to transportation to the Colony of New South Wales.
1837	20 June	Queen Victoria becomes queen of England; she will reign until January 22, 1901. The Victorian era starts.
1859	24 November	On the Origin of Species by Charles Darwin is published.
1863	10 January	The first London Underground train goes into operation.
1878		Women first admitted to the Universities of Oxford and Cambridge.

== 20th century ==
Year	Date	Event
1912	August	Harry Brearley invents stainless steel in Sheffield, Yorkshire.
1914	28 July	World War I begins.
1918	11 November	World War I ends.
1939	3 September	Britain declares war on Nazi Germany and enters World War II.
1945	8 May	Germany surrenders and World War II ends in Europe.
1948	5 July	The National Health Service is founded.
1973	1 January	The UK joins the European Communities (predecessor of the European Union).
1982	11 October	The Mary Rose is raised from the seabed of the Solent, where she had sunk in 1545.

== 21st century ==
Year	Date	Event
2004	June	The population of England reaches fifty million.
2020	31 January	Brexit takes place. The UK officially withdraws from the European Union three years after it voted to leave during a referendum in 2016.
2020	31 January	The first patient with COVID-19 is confirmed in York.
2022	8 September	Queen Elizabeth II dies of after a reign of 70 years and 214 days. She is succeeded by King Charles III.

== See also ==
=== City and town timelines ===
- Timeline of Bath
- Timeline of Barrow-in-Furness
- Timeline of Birmingham
- Timeline of Bradford
- Timeline of Bristol
- Timeline of Cambridge
- Timeline of Cheshire
- Timeline of Derby
- Timeline of Exeter
- Timeline of Hull
- Timeline of Leicester
- Timeline of Lincoln
- Timeline of Liverpool
- Timeline of London
- Timeline of Manchester
- Timeline of Norwich
- Timeline of Nottingham
- Timeline of Oxford
- Timeline of Plymouth
- Timeline of Reading
- Timeline of Sheffield
- Timeline of Southampton
- Timeline of St Columb Major
- Timeline of Sunderland
- Timeline of York

=== County timelines ===
- Timeline of Cheshire
- Timeline of Cornwall
- Timeline of Northumbria and Northumberland
- Timeline of Somerset
- Timeline of Sussex
