= Timeline of Cheshire history =

Coordinates: 53°10′N 2°35′W

The timeline of Cheshire history shows significant events in the history of the English county of Cheshire.

== 1–500 AD ==
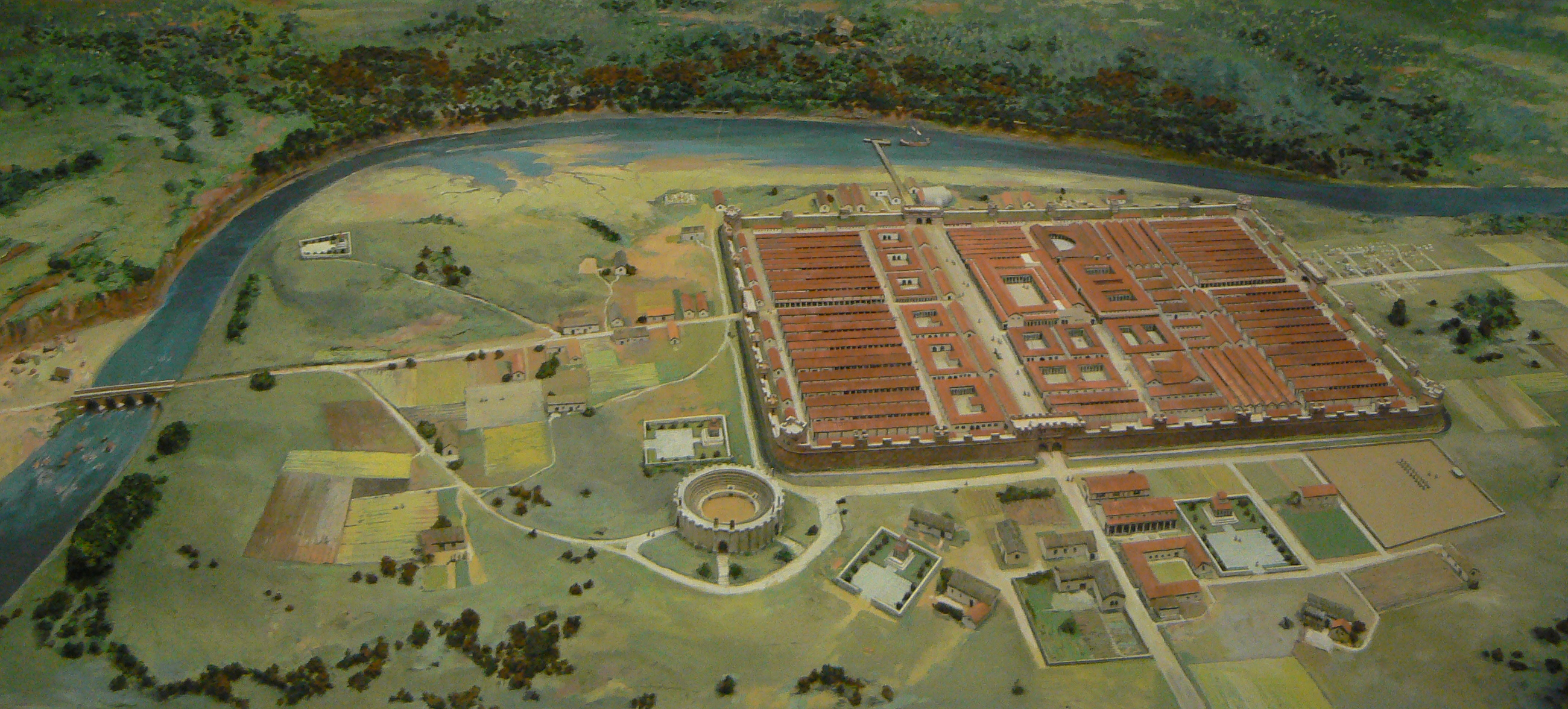
Model of Deva Victrix

- 70: The Romans found the fortress and town of Deva Victrix, now Chester.
- c. 90: Legio XX Valeria Victrix arrive in Chester.
- 410: Romans retreat from Britannia.
- 429: Germanus of Auxerre wins the Battle of Maes Garmon, near Mold, and establishes Cadell as the Christian ruler of a region, later Powys, based on pre-Roman Cornovii territory, thought to include Cheshire.

== 7th century ==
- 603: Synod of Chester.
- 616: Æthelfrith of Northumbria defeats a Welsh army at the Battle of Chester.
- 689: Church of St John the Baptist founded outside Chester city walls by King Æthelred of Mercia and Bishop Wilfrid.

== 9th century ==
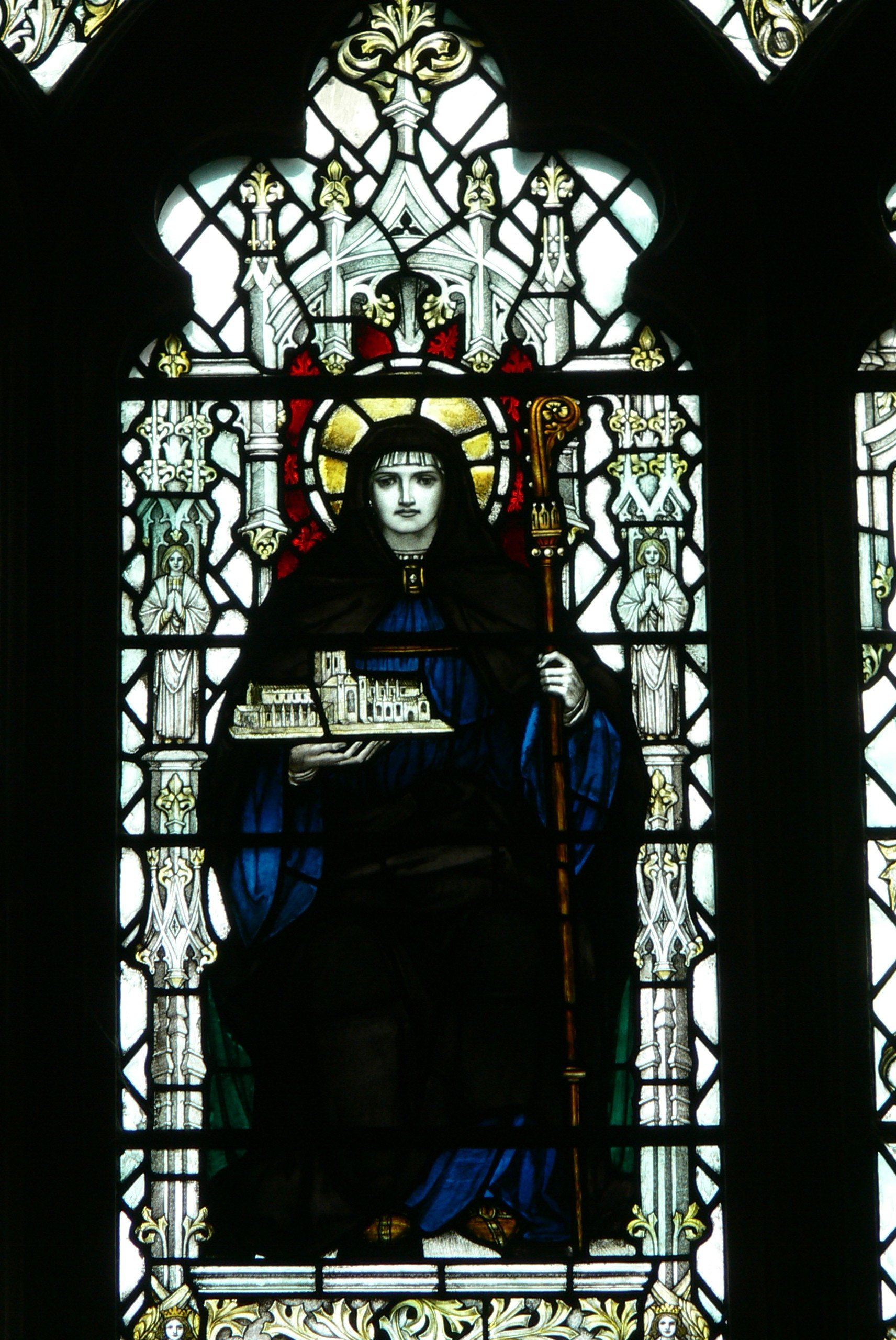
St Werburgh

- 830: The district was subjugated by Ecgberht, King of Wessex and incorporated in the kingdom of Mercia.
- 874 or 875: St Werburgh's remains brought to Chester for protection against Danish invaders.
- c. 890: Chester establishes a mint.
- 890: Plegmund, probably of Plemstall, becomes Archbishop of Canterbury.
- 893: First mention of Scandinavian settlers in Chester.
- 893–894: A Danish force overwinters in Chester.
- 894–895: King Alfred drives the Danes from Chester.

== 10th century ==
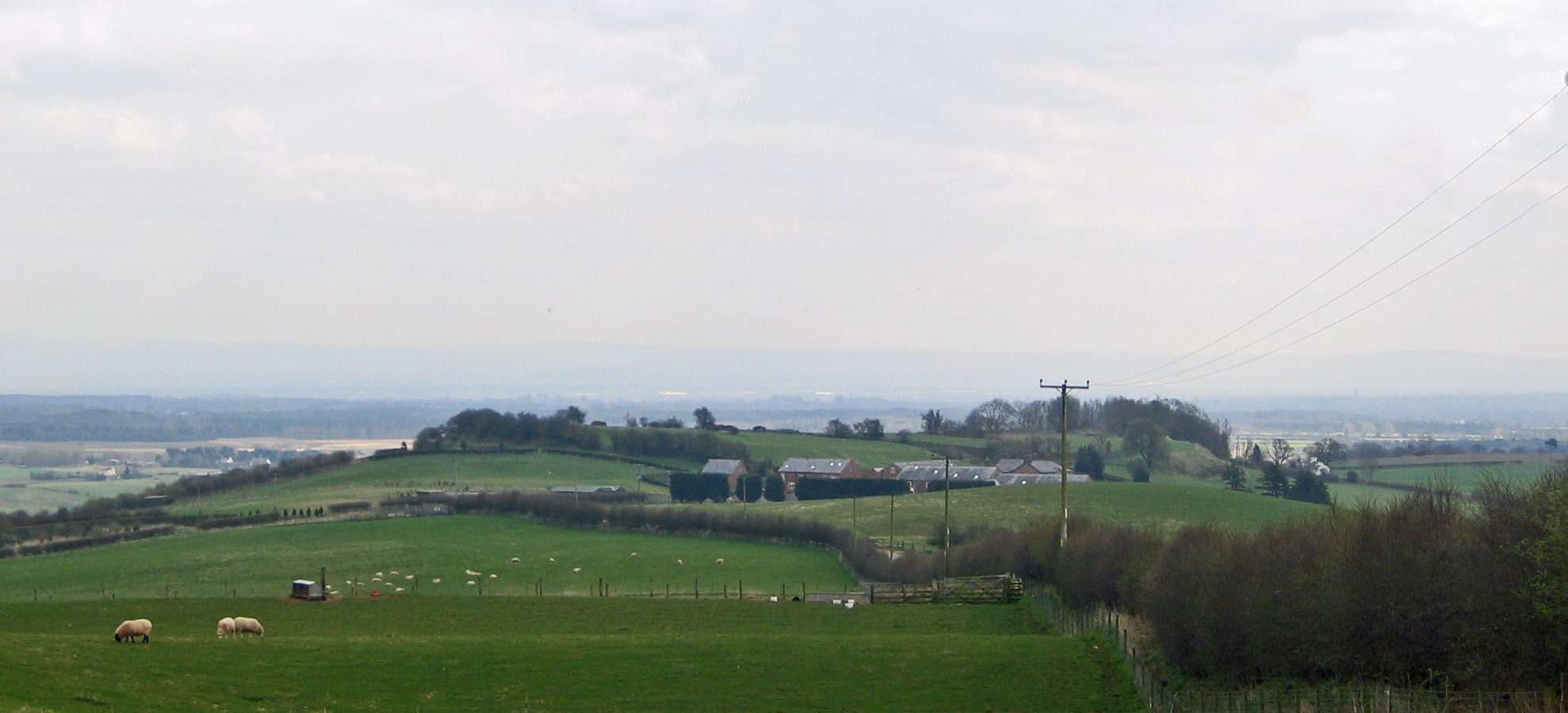
Eddisbury hill fort

- 907: Chester refounded as a burh by Æthelflæd and King Edward the Elder, and re-fortification starts.
- 907: Church to St Werburgh, later Chester Cathedral, founded by Æthelflæd, rebuilt from an earlier church dedicated to St Peter and St Paul.
- 907: Æthelflæd founds new church dedicated to St Peter and St Paul in Chester.
- 914: The Iron Age hill fort at Eddisbury is re-fortified by Æthelflæd.
- 915: Æthelflæd builds a burh at Runcorn.
- 915–920: Re-fortification of Chester probably completed.
- 919: Edward the Elder builds a burh at Thelwall.
- 923–924: Chester revolts against rule from Wessex and is subdued by Edward the Elder.
- 17 July 924: Edward the Elder dies at Farndon or Aldford.
- 937: King Æthelstan defeats the armies of Dublin, Alba and Strathclyde at the Battle of Brunanburh, probably near Bromborough.
- 958: King Edgar of England grants a charter to St Werburgh's Abbey, Chester.
- 973: Edgar of England visits Chester.
- 980: Vikings raid Chester.
- 980: First recorded use of the shire or county of Chester.

== 11th century ==
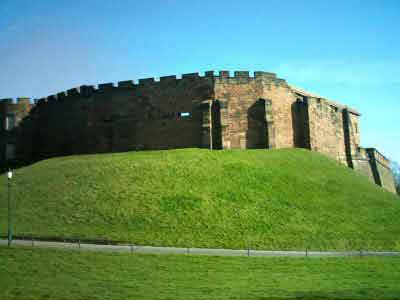
Chester Castle

- 1007: Eadric Streona becomes the King's ealdorman of Mercia.
- 1016: Edmund Ironside ravages Chester.
- c. 1017: King Cnut executes Eadric Streona, and makes Leofric Earl of Mercia.
- 1062: Edwin succeeds as Earl of Mercia.
- 1069–1071: William I leads the Norman Conquest into Cheshire; besieges Chester and kills Edwin, Earl of Mercia.
- 1070: Hugh d'Avranches created as first Earl of Chester.
- 1070: Chester Castle built.
- 1070: Frodsham Castle built.
- 1075: St John the Baptist's Church, Chester becomes a cathedral.
- 1092: Monastery founded on site of current Chester Cathedral by Hugh d'Avranches.

== 12th century ==
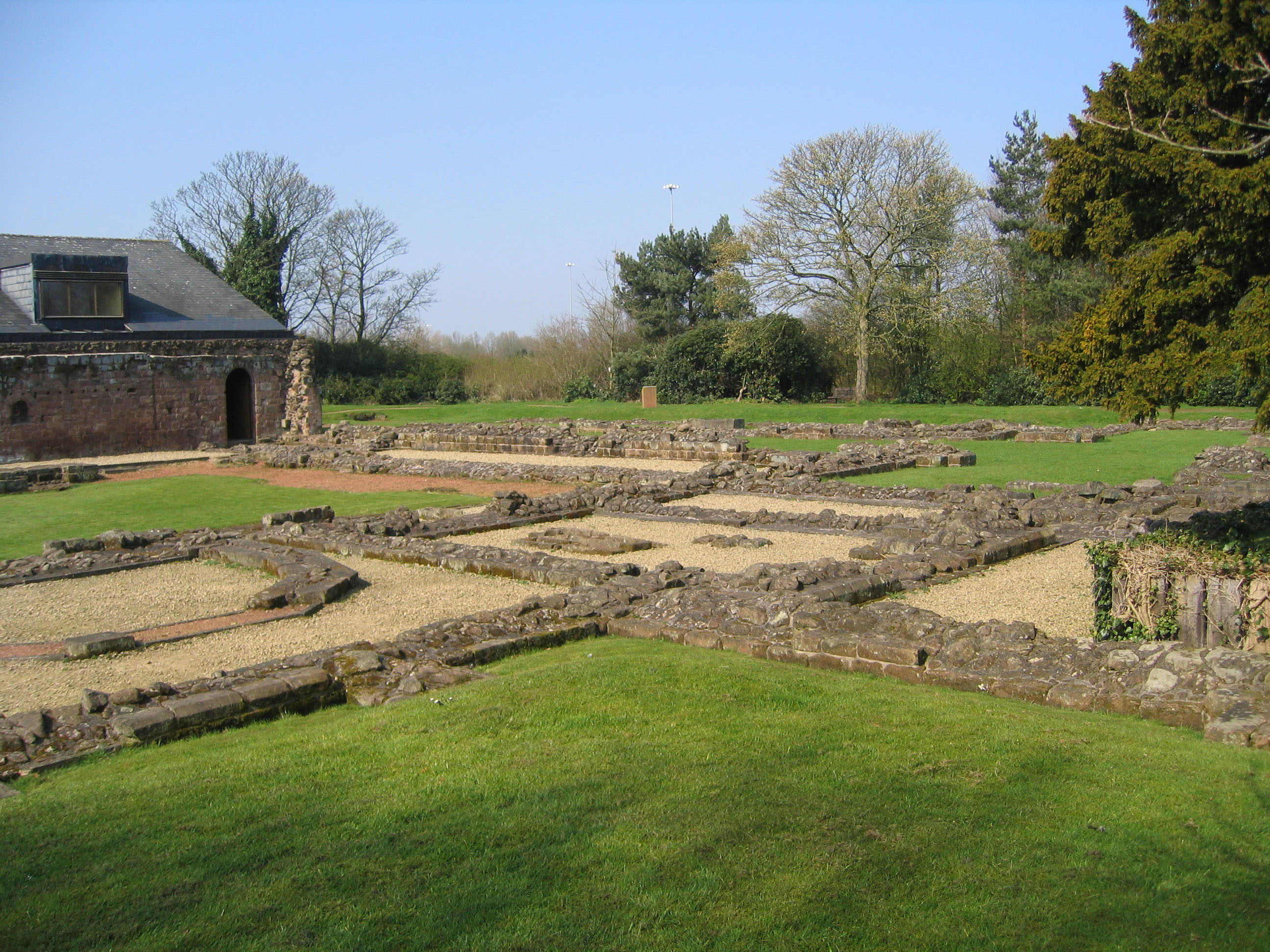
Remains of Norton Priory

- 1115: Norton Priory founded.
- 1133: Combermere Abbey founded.
- 1140: Serious fire in Chester.
- c. 1150: Ranulf de Gernon, 4th Earl of Chester founds a Benedictine nunnery in Chester.
- 1157: Henry II entertained at Chester Castle.
- 1165: Henry II entertained at Chester Castle again.
- 1180: Serious fire in Chester.
- 1182: Cheshire land north of the Mersey becomes part of the new county of Lancashire.
- 1190: Ranulf de Blondeville, 6th Earl of Chester founds Little St John's Hospital in Chester.
- c. 1195: Liber de Luciani laude Cestrie, the oldest surviving piece of Cheshire writing, was created.

== 13th century ==
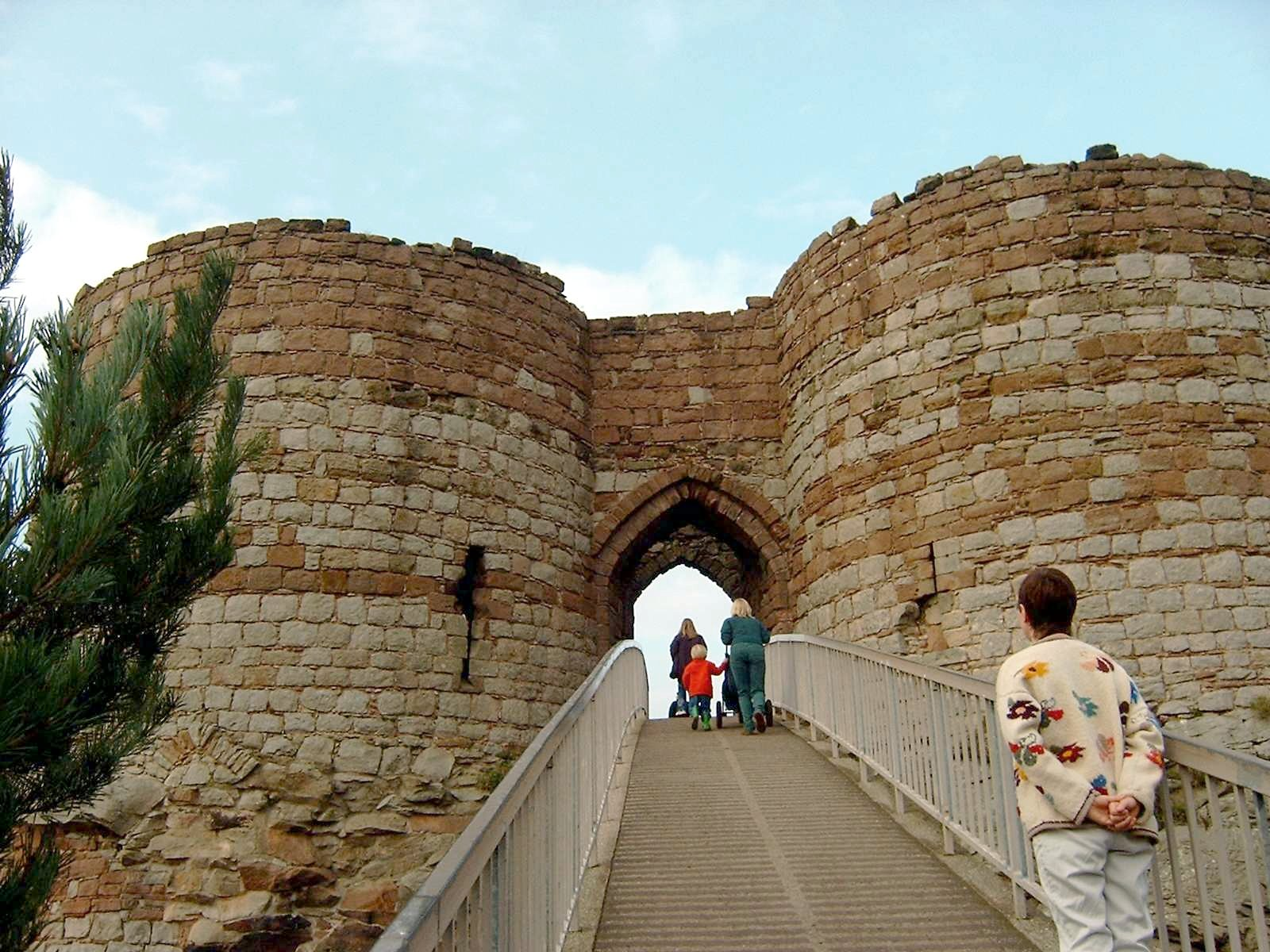
Beeston Castle

- 1211: King John entertained at Chester Castle.
- 1215–16: In the Carta Communis Cestriensis, Ranulf de Blondeville, 6th Earl of Chester grants limited concessions to his feudal lords.
- 1220s: Beeston Castle built.
- 1236: Dominican friars arrive in Chester.
- 1237: 7th Earl of Chester, John, dies without a male heir. Henry IV passes the title to his son, Prince Edward – later to become King Edward I.
- 1237–38: Franciscan friars arrive in Chester.
- 1237–51: Stone walls replace the wooden palisade around Chester Castle.
- 1253: Aldford and Alderley markets created.
- 1261: Macclesfield market created.
- 1264: The castle and city of Chester were granted to Simon de Montfort.
- 1272: Congleton market created.
- 1275: Monks of St Werburgh's Abbey build Kaleyard Gate in Chester city walls.
- 1277: King Edward I lays foundation stone to Vale Royal Abbey.
- 12 May 1278: Serious fire in Chester when nearly the whole of the city is burnt.
- 1279–80: Timber superstructure of the Old Dee Bridge swept away.
- 1280: Over market created.
- 1281: Serious fire in Middlewich.
- 1292–93: Chambers for the king and queen, and a new outer gatehouse built at Chester Castle.

== 14th century ==
- 1306: Serious fire in Northwich.
- 1322–25: Chester Water Tower built.
- 1349: The black death arrives in Cheshire.
- 1364: Doddington Castle built.
- 20 July 1376: Charter of disafforestation of Wirral issued.
- 1387: Major repairs to the Old Dee Bridge.
- 1391: Norton Priory becomes a mitred abbey.
- 1394: Richard II visits Chester with many of his nobles.
- 1397: Lands in the march of Wales added to Cheshire, and it is promoted to the rank of principality.
- 16 October 1398: Richard II gives 3000 marks to his Cheshire supporters at the Battle of Radcot Bridge.
- 1399: Henry IV (then still Duke of Lancaster) seizes Chester Castle and causes Richard II to be brought there from Flint Castle, after which Richard abdicates and Henry becomes king.
- 1399–1407: Tower built to fortify Chester's Dee Bridge.

== 15th century ==
- 1400: Unsuccessful attack on Chester Castle by supporters of deposed Richard II.
- July 1403: Many Cheshire gentry support the unsuccessful uprising of Henry "Hotspur" Percy against Henry IV.
- 1422: First reference to Chester Mystery Plays.
- 1433: Famine led to food shortages in Chester.
- July 1438: Serious fire in Nantwich.
- 1444: Henry VI visits Chester.
- 1445: Fee-farm (rent payable to the Crown) for Chester is halved from £100 to £50, attributed to silting of the River Dee; further reductions agreed in 1484 and 1486.
- 1450: A group of Cheshire gentry successfully petitions the Crown against the introduction of a parliamentary subsidy.
- 1452, 1455, 1459: Margaret of Anjou visits Chester.
- 23 September 1459: Many Cheshire gentry killed fighting on both sides in the Battle of Blore Heath, early in the Wars of the Roses.
- 1470: Edward IV visits Chester.
- April 1484: Richard III visits Chester.
- March 1486: Henry VII visits Chester.
- 1488: Stockport Grammar School is founded.
- 1492, 1494: Fires in Chester's Foregate and Northgate Streets.
- July 1493: Henry VII again visits Chester.
- 1497: First performance of Chester Midsummer Show.

== 16th century ==
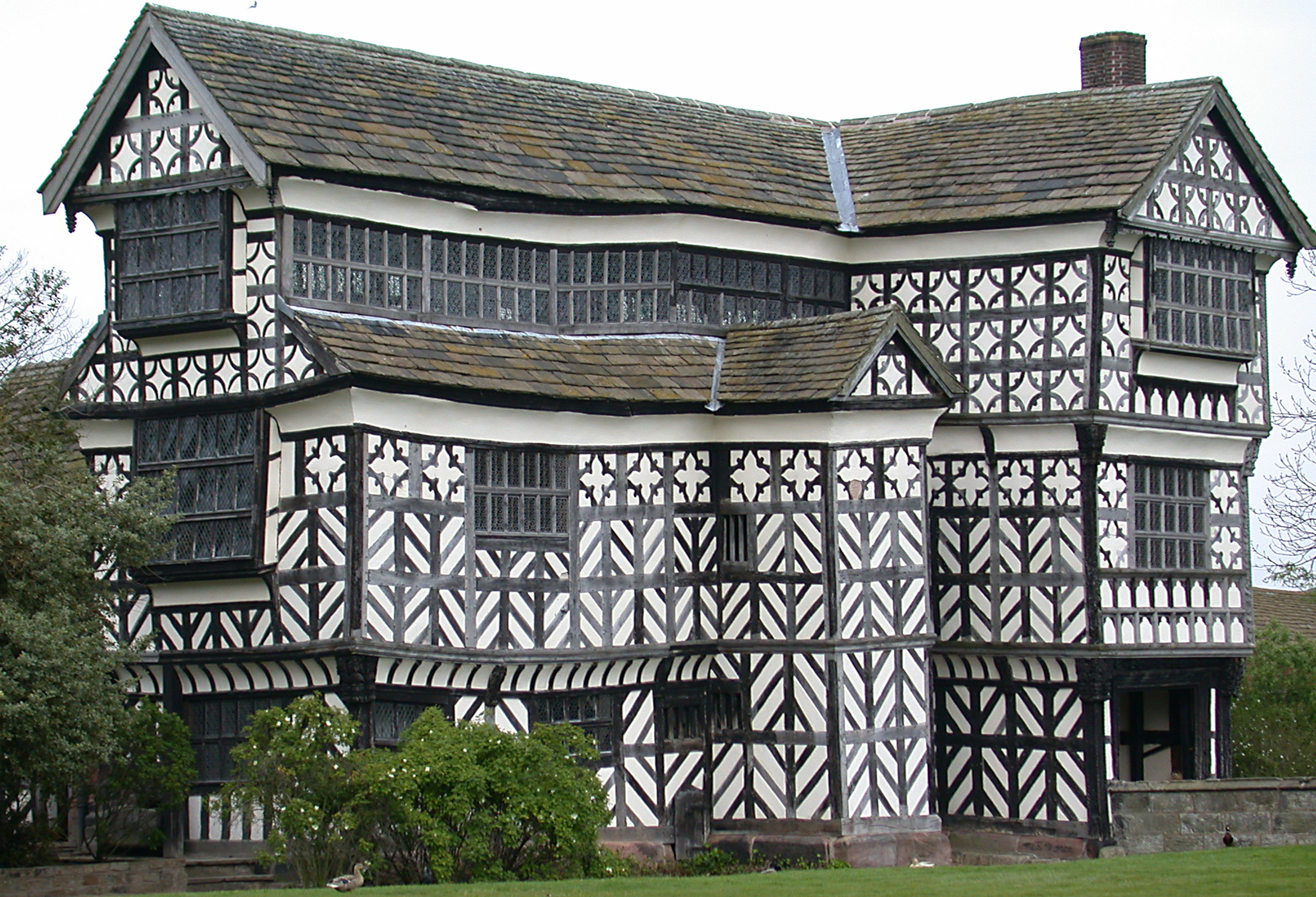
Little Moreton Hall

- 1502: Macclesfield Grammar School is founded.
- 1504-1508: Construction of the earliest part of Little Moreton Hall near Congleton.
- 1506: Great Charter establishes Chester as a county, codifies its government, and gives the city the right to hold a court of quarter sessions.
- April 1506: Henry VII visits Chester.
- 1507: Outbreak of "sweating sickness" in Chester.
- 1510: St Ursula's Hospital founded in Chester.
- 1527: Malpas Grammar School founded.
- 1535: Outbreak of plague in Nantwich.
- 1536: Dissolution of Norton Priory.
- 1536: First piped water supply for civil use in Chester established.
- 1538: Dissolution of Vale Royal Abbey by Sir Thomas Holcroft.
- July 1538: Dissolution of Combermere Abbey.
- 15 August 1538: Dissolution of Chester's three friaries.
- 20 January 1540: Dissolution of St Werburgh's Abbey.
- 1541: St Werburgh's abbey becomes a cathedral of the Church of England known as Chester Cathedral by order of King Henry VIII. Chester becomes a diocese.
- 1543: Cheshire sends its first members to sit in Parliament.
- 1575: Chester Mystery Plays are banned.

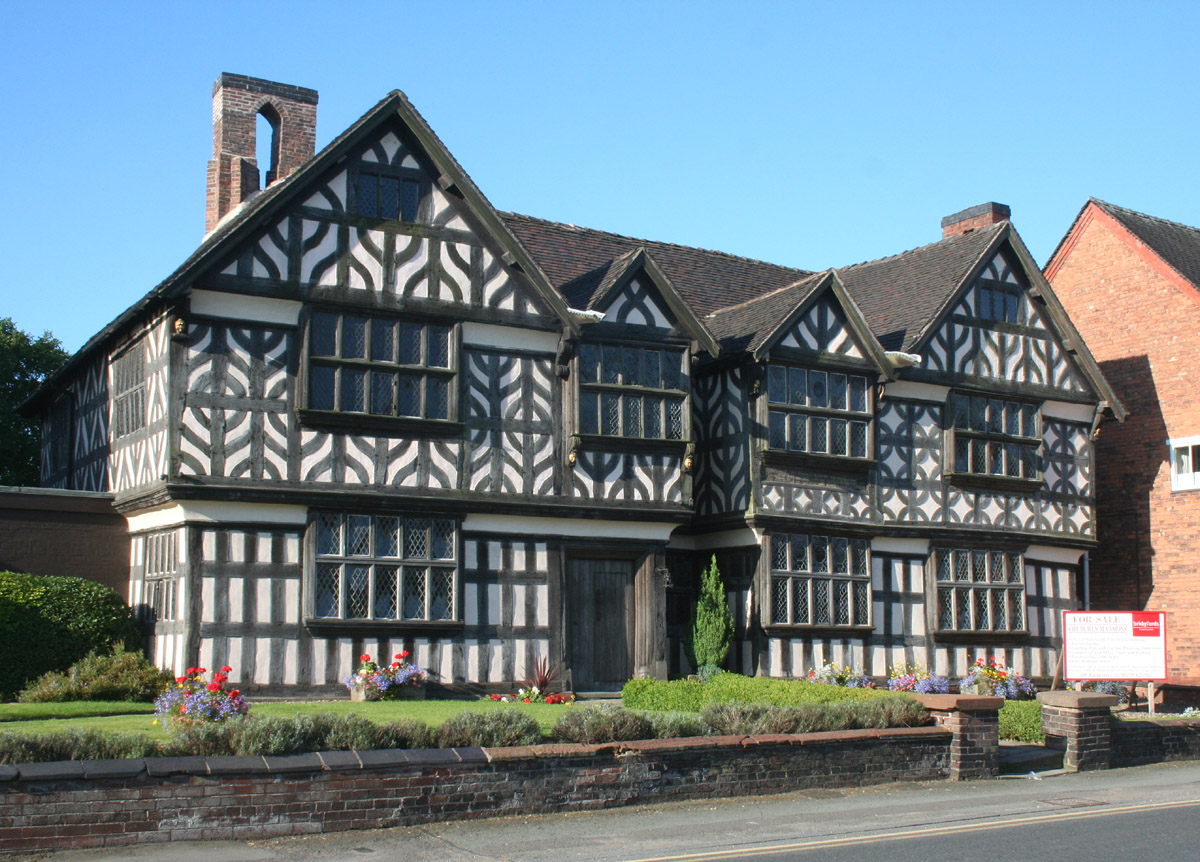
Churche's Mansion, Nantwich

- 1577: Christopher Saxton publishes his map of Cheshire.
- 1578: Sandbach market opens.
- December 1583: Fire destroys much of Nantwich, but not Churche's Mansion built in 1577.
- 1584: Elizabeth I contributes to a national fund for the rebuilding of Nantwich.
- 1591: Stanley Palace built in Chester on the site of the former Dominican friary.

== 17th century ==
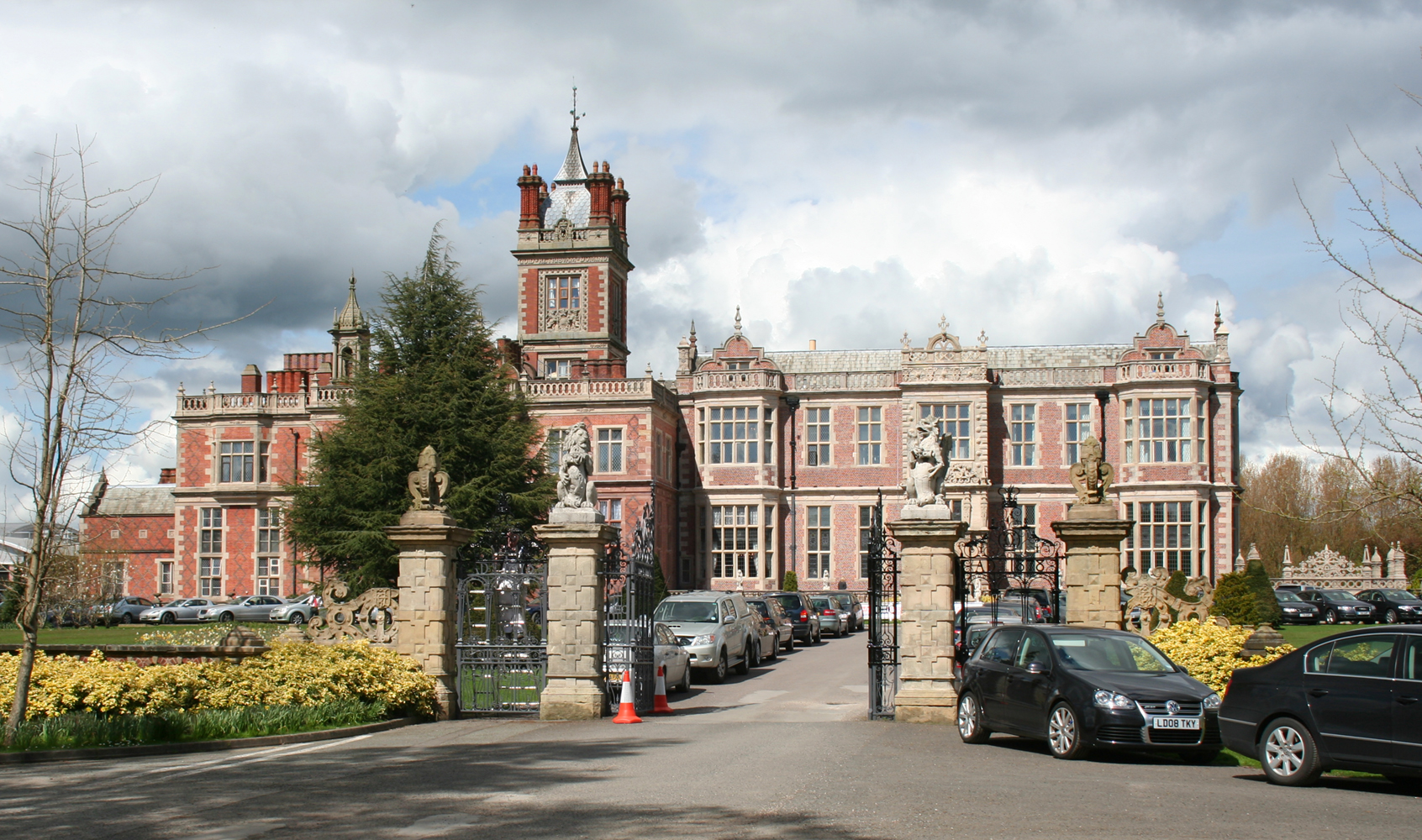
Crewe Hall

- 1604: Outbreak of the plague kills around 500 people in Nantwich.
- 1636: Completion of Crewe Hall.
- 1637: First known stagecoach runs between Birmingham and Holywell via Nantwich and Chester.
- 1642: Failure of the Bunbury Agreement, an attempt by local gentry to keep Cheshire neutral in the English Civil War.
- 23–28 September 1642: Charles I in Chester.
- 13 March 1643: First Battle of Middlewich in English Civil War.
- 24 January 1644: Battle of Nantwich in the English Civil War.
- November 1644–February 1645: Siege of Chester.
- 24 September 1645: Battle of Rowton Heath in the English Civil War.
- 3 February 1646: Chester surrenders to the Parliamentary forces.
- 21 October 1650: First record of the Cheshire cheese trade with London.
- 1655: Cheshire under military rule, governed by Charles Worsley.
- 1657: Stagecoach service begins between London and Chester.
- 1670: Smith-Barry family re-discovers salt in Northwich and mining restarts.
- 1674: John Ray's Collection of English Words includes written record of the Cheshire dialect.
- 1687: James II visits Chester.
- 6 June 1690: William III stays at Combermere Abbey on his way to the Battle of the Boyne.

== 18th century ==
- 1700: Brine springs are discovered at Winsford.
- 1735–36: The New Cut dug along the River Dee from Chester to Connah's Quay because of silting of the river.
- 1744: Charles Roe builds a watermill in Macclesfield and triggers start of the silk industry.
- 12 May 1762: Creation of the title of Baron Vernon, of Kinderton in the County of Chester.

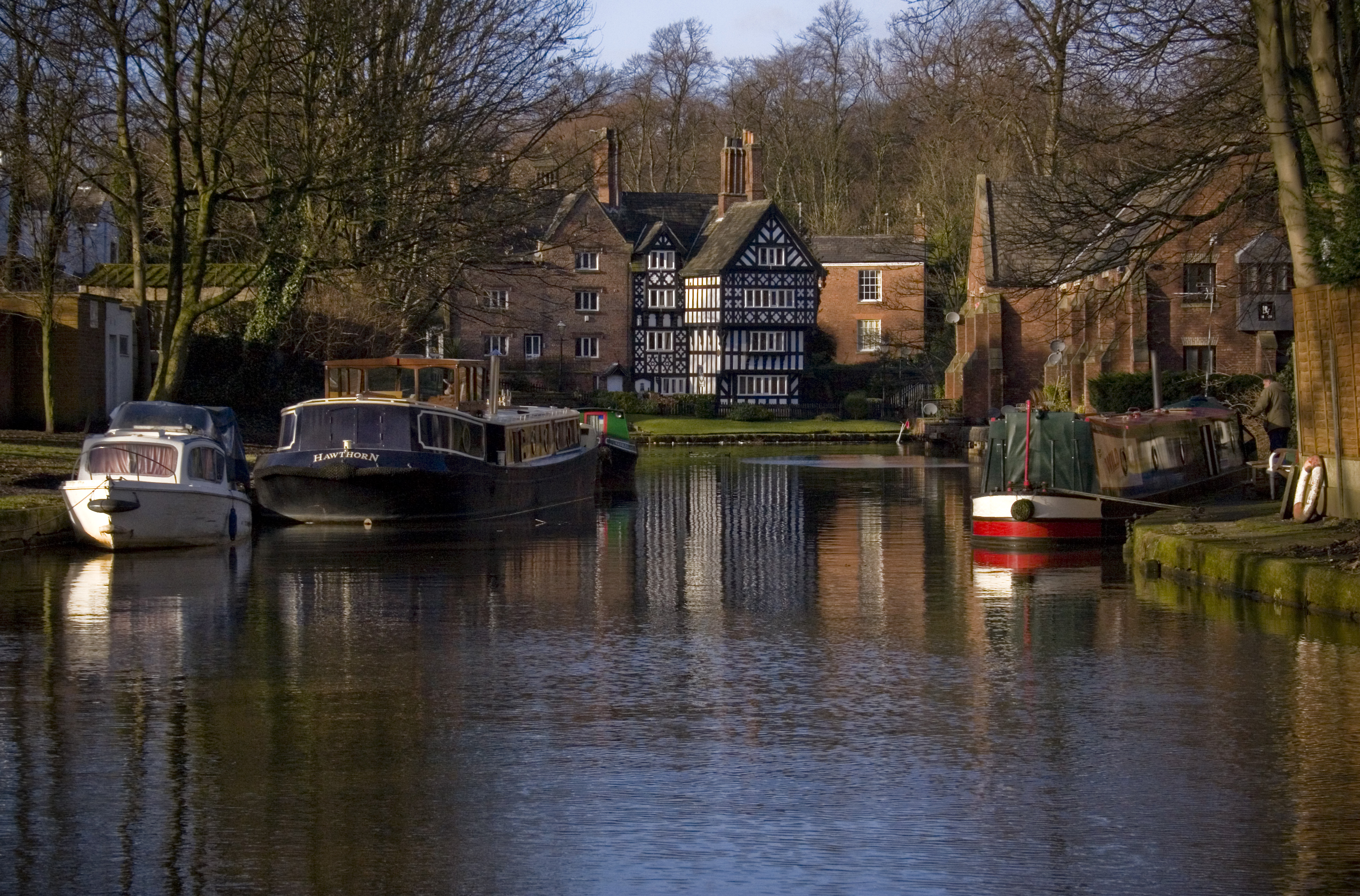
Bridgewater Canal in Worsley

- 1763: Cheshire Hunt founded.
- March 1776: Bridgewater Canal complete throughout its length from Manchester to Runcorn.
- 1777: Completion of the Trent and Mersey Canal.
- 1779: The Chester Canal opens between Chester and Nantwich.
- 1780: Chester Eastgate rebuilt.
- 1780: Marston salt mine opens.
- 1781: Chester Northgate rebuilt.
- 1784: First mail coach runs through Cheshire, between London and Holyhead.
- 1788: Chester Watergate rebuilt.
- 1788–1815: Major rebuilding of Chester Castle by Thomas Harrison
- 1795: The Chester Canal extended to Ellesmere Port.

== 19th century ==
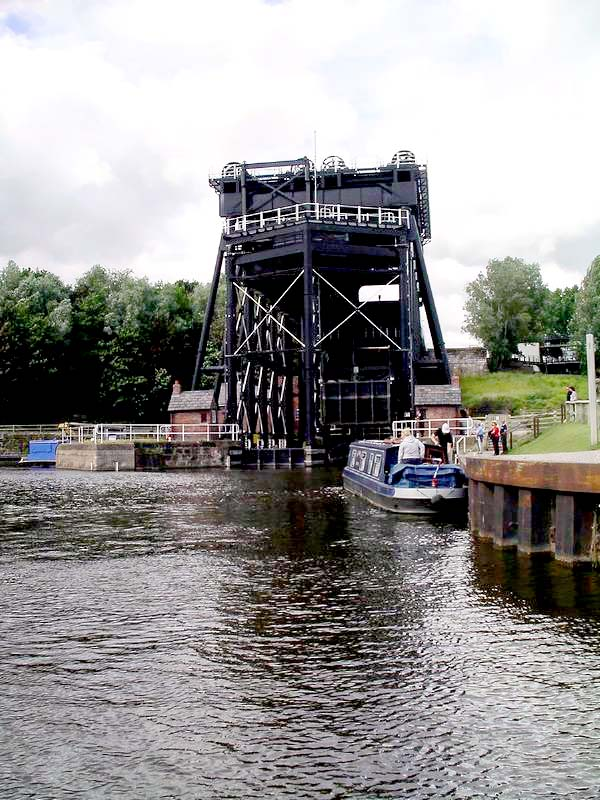
Anderton Boat Lift

- July 1804: Runcorn to Latchford Canal opens.
- 1806: The Middlewich Branch opens, linking the Shropshire Union and the Trent and Mersey Canals.
- 1808–10: Chester Northgate rebuilt.
- 8 May 1817: Early paper on Cheshire dialect read at Society of Antiquaries by Roger Wilbraham.
- 1812: Delamere Forest disforested.
- 1832: The future Queen Victoria opens the Grosvenor Bridge in Chester.
- 1837: Crewe railway station is built in fields near to Crewe Hall.
- 1838: First meeting of the Cheshire Agricultural Society.
- 1839: Foundation of Chester Diocesan Training College, now the University of Chester.
- 1840: Crewe–Chester–Birkenhead railway line opens.
- 1843: Crewe Railway Works opens.
- 1843: Foundation of the Chetham Society.
- 1845: Crewe Railway Works completes its first locomotive, Columbine.
- 24 May 1847: Five people are killed in the Dee bridge disaster when a girder of the railway bridge crossing the River Dee fractures.
- 1848: Chester railway station opens.
- 1855–76: George Gilbert Scott works on restoring Chester Cathedral.
- 1857: Cheshire Constabulary founded.
- 1862: Chester Exchange is gutted by fire.
- 1865–66: Devastating outbreak of rinderpest (cattle plague) causes the collapse of the county's economy.
- 1867: Grosvenor Park opens in Chester.
- 21 May 1868: The first train crosses Runcorn Railway Bridge.
- 1869: Railway line opens between Weaver Junction and Liverpool via Runcorn.
- 15 October 1869: Chester Town Hall opened by Prince of Wales, later King Edward VII.
- 1871: Population: 561,201.
- 1874: John Brunner and Ludwig Mond found Brunner Mond in Winnington near Northwich and start manufacturing soda ash.
- 1874: Cheshire Lines Committee opens railway line between Manchester and Chester via Altrincham.
- 1875: Anderton Boat Lift opens.
- 1877: Glossary of Cheshire dialect published by Egerton Leigh.
- 11 March 1878: Foundation of the Record Society of Lancashire and Cheshire.
- 1881: The west tower of St John the Baptist's Church, Chester collapses.
- 1886: The Grosvenor Museum opens in Chester.
- 1886: Rail tunnel under the River Mersey opens between Liverpool and Birkenhead.
- 1889: Cheshire County Council founded.
- 1891: Population: 730,058.
- 21 May 1894: Manchester Ship Canal officially opened by Queen Victoria.
- 27 May 1899: Official opening of Eastgate Clock in Chester on Queen Victoria's 80th birthday.

== 20th century ==
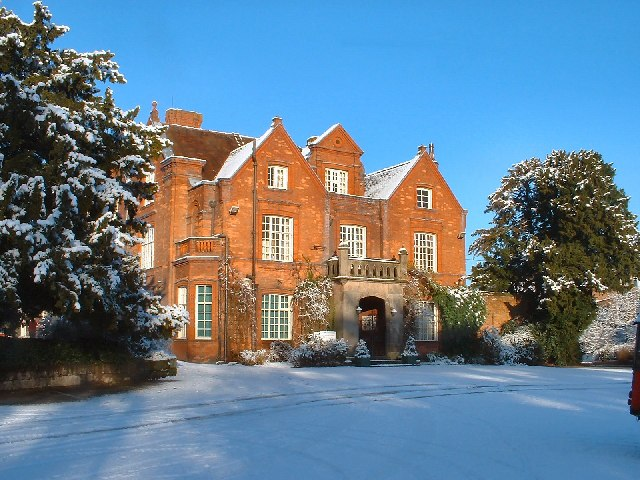
Cheshire School of Agriculture

- 1901: Population: 815,099.
- 29 May 1905: Widnes-Runcorn Transporter Bridge officially opened by Sir John Brunner.
- 1914: Completion of 800 houses were built since 1899 at Port Sunlight to house a population of 3,500.
- 1921: Cheshire School of Agriculture opens at Worleston.
- 1926: Imperial Chemical Industries is created.
- 1931: Chester Zoo opens.
- 1938: Newgate opens in Chester.
- 1951: Chester Mystery Plays are revived.
- 21 July 1961: Runcorn-Widnes road bridge (later named the Silver Jubilee Bridge) is opened by Princess Alexandra.
- 1964: Runcorn New Town is designated.
- 1969: First conservation areas designated, including Chester and Nantwich.
- 1 April 1974: Cheshire boundaries changed by Local Government Act 1972. Runcorn and Widnes merge to form the Borough of Halton.
- 1982: Norton Priory Museum opens.
- 1983: Anderton Boat Lift closes.
- 26 February 1993: IRA explosive devices go off at Warrington gasworks.
- 20 March 1993:: IRA explosive devices kill two children and injure 54 people in Warrington.
- 1 April 1998: Halton and Warrington become unitary authorities.

== 21st century ==
- 2002: Anderton Boat Lift reopens.
- 1 September 2007: The Cheshire Regiment merges into the Mercian Regiment.
- 1 April 2009: Two unitary authorities of Cheshire West and Chester and Cheshire East replace Cheshire County Council and its districts.
- 14 October 2017: Mersey Gateway Bridge, a six-lane road bridge crossing the River Mersey between Runcorn and Widnes, opens.

== See also ==
- History of Cheshire
