= Cheshire dialect =

Dialect of English

Cheshire Dialect
- Native to: England
- Region: Cheshire
- Ethnicity: English
- Language family: Indo-European: Germanic; West Germanic; Ingvaeonic; Anglo-Frisian; Anglic; Anglian; North Anglic; Northern English; Cheshire Dialect
- Early forms: Old English: Middle English; Early Modern English
- Dialects: Cheshire

Language codes
- ISO 639-3: –
- Location of Cheshire within England
- Coordinates: 53°10′N 2°35′W

The Cheshire dialect is a Northern English dialect spoken in the county of Cheshire in North West England. It has similarities with the dialects of the surrounding counties of Merseyside, Greater Manchester, Staffordshire, Shropshire, and Derbyshire.

== History ==
The dialect has existed for centuries and is distinct from what became standard British English. The works of the 14th century poets, including Sir Gawain and the Green Knight, the religious poem St. Erkenwald, and other works of the Gawain poet, are written in this dialect. Cheshire author Alan Garner states "Of course [the Cheshire dialect] has changed, as all living language changes, since the time of the Gawain poet. But when I read sections of the poem aloud to my father, he knew, and used, more than 90% of the vocabulary; and the phonetics of the vowels have scarcely changed."

Early references include English proverbs and dialect words collected by John Ray in the 17th century, and a glossary of Cheshire words compiled by Roger Wilbraham in 1817 and expanded in 1826. These sources were expanded by Egerton Leigh in a glossary published posthumously in 1877, which was an attempt to preserve a way of speech that was already under threat from "emigration, railways, and the blending of shires." Leigh notes that some words collected by Ray had already disappeared. Later reference works include Thomas Darlington's Folk-speech of South Cheshire (1887) and Peter Wright's The Cheshire Chatter (1979).

== Characteristics and usage ==
Cheshire dialect contains some words that are distinct from standard English, such as "shippen" for cow shed. According to Leigh, most unique Cheshire words derive from Anglo-Saxon; "shippen" is from scypen. Other words derive from transposition, for example, "waps" for "wasp" and "neam" for "name". The British Library Sound Archive contains recordings of the dialect from various parts of the county. A number of authors have written in Cheshire dialect, including poetry by H. V. Lucas (Homage to Cheshire; 1939–60) and Rowland Egerton-Warburton (Hunting Songs; 1877), and prose by Beatrice Tunstall.

== Phonology ==
Like most dialects in Northern England and the Midlands, Cheshire English lacks both the trap-bath and foot-strut splits. Words with the bath vowel like castle or past are pronounced with [a] instead of [ɑː] while words with the strut vowel such as cut, up and lunch are pronounced with [ʊ] instead of [ʌ] like in most of Southern England. H-dropping is another feature which occurs in Cheshire English, in which the [h] sound is usually omitted from most words, while NG-coalescence is also absent, with the ng in words like sing or thing being pronounced as [ŋɡ] instead of just [ŋ] like in most English dialects. Some areas in the north-west of Cheshire such as Runcorn or Ellesmere Port share phonological similarities with Merseyside English, with features such as [k] being fricatised into [x], along with the dental fricatives [θ] and [ð] being realised as dental stops [t̪] and [d̪], being present in some cases.

== See also ==
- Potteries dialect

== Bibliography ==
- Wells, John C. (1982). Accents of English. Vol. 1: An Introduction (pp. i–xx, 1–278), Vol. 2: The British Isles (pp. i–xx, 279–466), Vol. 3: Beyond the British Isles (pp. i–xx, 467–674). Cambridge University Press. doi:10.1017/CBO9780511611759, doi:10.1017/CBO9780511611766. ISBN 0-52129719-2, 0-52128540-2, 0-52128541-0.
