= Stanley Palace =

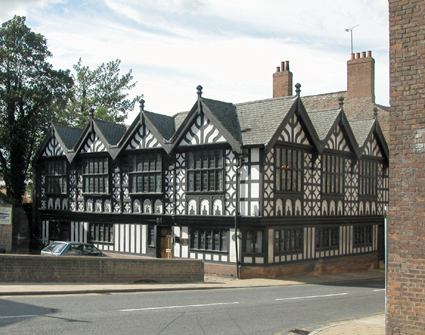
- Stanley Palace

- Location within Cheshire
- 53.1895°N 2.8957°W
- Location: Watergate Street, Chester, Cheshire, England
- OS grid reference: SJ 402 662

History
- Built: 1591
- Built for: Sir Peter Warburton
- Rebuilt: Early 18th century 1935

Site notes
- Website: stanleypalace.co.uk

Listed Building – Grade II
- Official name: (Stanley Palace)
- Designated: 28 July 1955
- Reference no.: 1376455

Stanley Palace is on Watergate Street, Chester, Cheshire, England. It is recorded in the National Heritage List for England as a designated Grade II listed building. Built as a town house for Sir Peter Warburton in 1591, it has since been apartments, a boys' school, and a museum.

The building is administered by the Friends of Stanley Palace. It is used as a hire space and meeting rooms.

== History ==
Stanley Palace was built in 1591 on the site of the former Black (Dominican) Friary. It was built as the town house for Sir Peter Warburton, a local lawyer and Member of Parliament. When he died in 1621, the house was inherited by his daughter. She married Sir Thomas Stanley who gave his name to the house. After the Civil Wars, James Stanley (The 7th Earl) was held under arrest at the house, and transported to Bolton for execution. Part of the house was demolished, and the southwest wing was rebuilt in the early 18th century. The house then ceased to be a mansion house and by the early 19th century it had been divided into apartments and its condition was deteriorating. during the 1870s housed a boys' school. The building was sold to the 15th Earl of Derby in 1889. In the early 1920s. the building contained "a museum of 1,000 curios". The north wing was rebuilt in 1935.

== Architecture ==
The house is timber-framed on an ashlar sandstone plinth in two storeys. The south wall is brick and the roofs are slate. There are four gables on the east face and three on the north face which overlooks the street. On the ground floor there is a door on the east face and mullioned windows on both faces. The upper storey is jettied with a moulded bressumer. In each bay of the upper storey on both faces is a ten-light mullioned and transomed window, each of which contains leaded lights. Below and to the sides of these windows are panels, most of which are decorated. In the gables are wavy herringbone struts. At the top of each gable is a finial.

== See also ==
- Grade II listed buildings in Chester (central)
