= Timeline of St Columb Major =

The following is a timeline of the history of St Columb Major, Cornwall, England, United Kingdom.

== Prehistory ==
- Castle an Dinas, (Iron Age) hillfort occupied
- Nine Maidens stone row constructed
- Devil's Quoit monument erected

== Early history to 11th century ==
- The Columba Celtic stone cross in the churchyard dates from the 10th century

== 12th–15th centuries ==
- 1333 Edward III granted a market in St Columb Major to Sir John Arundell. This was as a reward for supplying troops to fight the Scottish at the Battle of Halidon Hill near Berwick-on-Tweed.
- 1427: College founded by Sir John Arundell
- 1433: John Arundell (1366 - 1435) gave £20 for the construction of the tower and to pay for its bells.
- 11 January 1435: John Arundell dies

== 16th century ==
- 1549 William Mayow, the Mayor of St Columb, was hanged by Provost Marshal, Anthony Kingston outside a tavern in St Columb as a punishment for leading an uprising in Cornwall.
- 1585: The Green Book of St Columb has one of the earliest references to Morris dancing.

== 17th century ==
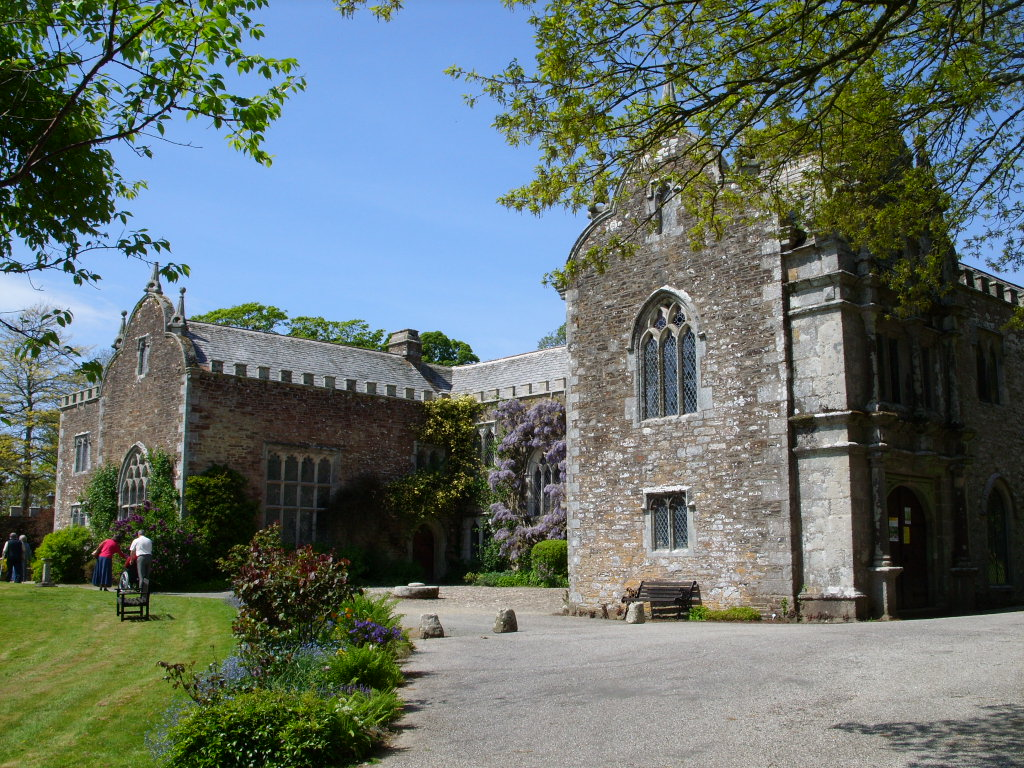
Trewan Hall frontage

- 1633: Trewan Hall was built by the Vivian family
- 7 March 1645: During the English Civil War, Sir Thomas Fairfax and his troops halted one night near St Columb.
- 23 June 1671: a man called John Trehenban murdered two young girls at St Columb and was sentenced to imprisonment in a cage on Castle an Dinas, and starved to death. The murder of the two young girls is recorded in the Parish Register.
- 1676, the greatest part of the church of St Columb was blown up with gunpowder by three youths of the town.

== 18th century ==
- October 1715: James Paynter, a leader of the Jacobite uprising in Cornwall of 1715 declared the Old Pretender in St Columb town square.
- 1733 Work started on St Columb Canal which was conceived and designed by the Cornish engineer, John Edyvean. The canal was partly built but never fully opened

== 19th century ==
- 1803: Nanswhyden mansion house burns down
- 1840: The St Columb Major Union workhouse was built on a site at the north of St Columb Major. It was designed by George Gilbert Scott and his partner William Bonython Moffatt.
- 1844: St Columb Bank was launched by five businessmen named Ricketts, Enthoven, Turner, Mason and James.
- 1848 (8 August): Birth of Henry Jenner at St Columb. He was a Celtic scholar, Cornish cultural activist, and the chief originator of the Cornish language revival.
- 1850: The medieval Old Rectory was rebuilt as a possible Bishop's Palace when St Columb Major was one of several Cornish towns considered as the location for Cornwall's new cathedral
- 15 September 1854: Death of James Polkinghorne, champion Cornish wrestler of the 19th century. He was born in 1788 at St Keverne, spent much of his life at St Columb Major, where he ran the Red Lion.
- 1856 The Old College buildings next to the Church were pulled down. A stone cross from the site was rescued and placed re-erected near the church door.
- 1875: St Columb Central School opened on Lady Day (25th March). Designed by Cornish Architect, Silvanus Trevail
- 1887: Bank House completed in Market Place. Designed by the architect, William White.
- Jan 1895: Church tower struck was by lightning during service causing a fire. One of the bell ringers was thrown over a balcony by the force.
- 1891 The Cornish Bank designed by Silvanus Trevail built

== 20th century ==
- 9 June 1909: The town was visited by the Prince of Wales (George V) and his wife, the Princess of Wales (Mary of Teck). The visit was to open the Royal Cornwall Agricultural Show. The Prince gave 2 silver cups: one for the best bull and another for the best horse.
- 1920: The chiming clock was added as a memorial to the men of the town who died in the Great War.
- 1928: St Columb Football team win the Cornwall Junior Cup, beating Delabole (3-1)
- 28th Sept 1960: Cloudburst hits town. Firemen rescue family at Bridge
- 1971: Local Business P. Glanville Ironmonger and Builder's Merchant created
- 1976: The St Columb Major Conservation Area was designated in 1976 by Restormel Borough Council.
- 3 June 1977: The A39 by-pass opened
- August 1977: The Queen and Prince Philip visited the town during their Silver Jubilee tour of Cornwall.
- 27 May 1983: The town was visited by the Prince and Princess of Wales (Charles and Diana). The visit was to commemorate the 650th anniversary of the signing of the town charter by Edward III.
- 1988/89 Pall Corporation, Factory built at Southern end of the Town.
- 1992 Australian stuntman Matt Coulter aka The Kangaroo Kid set the record for the longest jump with a crash on a quad bike at Retallack Adventure Park, St Columb Major.

== 21st century ==
- 2011 St Columb Primary school becomes an Academy
- 2014 Barclays Bank closes
- 2017 Lloyds Bank closes
- 2021 George Clarkes 'Remarkable Renovations' features the town and development of the Lloyds Bank into a home.
