= Roger Wilbraham (MP) =

British MP, bibliophile, antiquary and historian

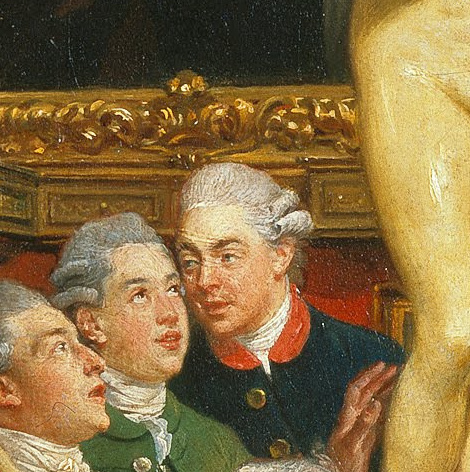
- Detail from Tribuna of the Uffizi (1772–1778) by Johann Zoffany, showing Wilbraham (probably on the left) among a group admiring the statue of the Venus de' Medici
- Born: 30 December 1743; Nantwich
- Died: 3 January 1829 (aged 85); London
- Education: Trinity College, Cambridge
- Political party: Whig

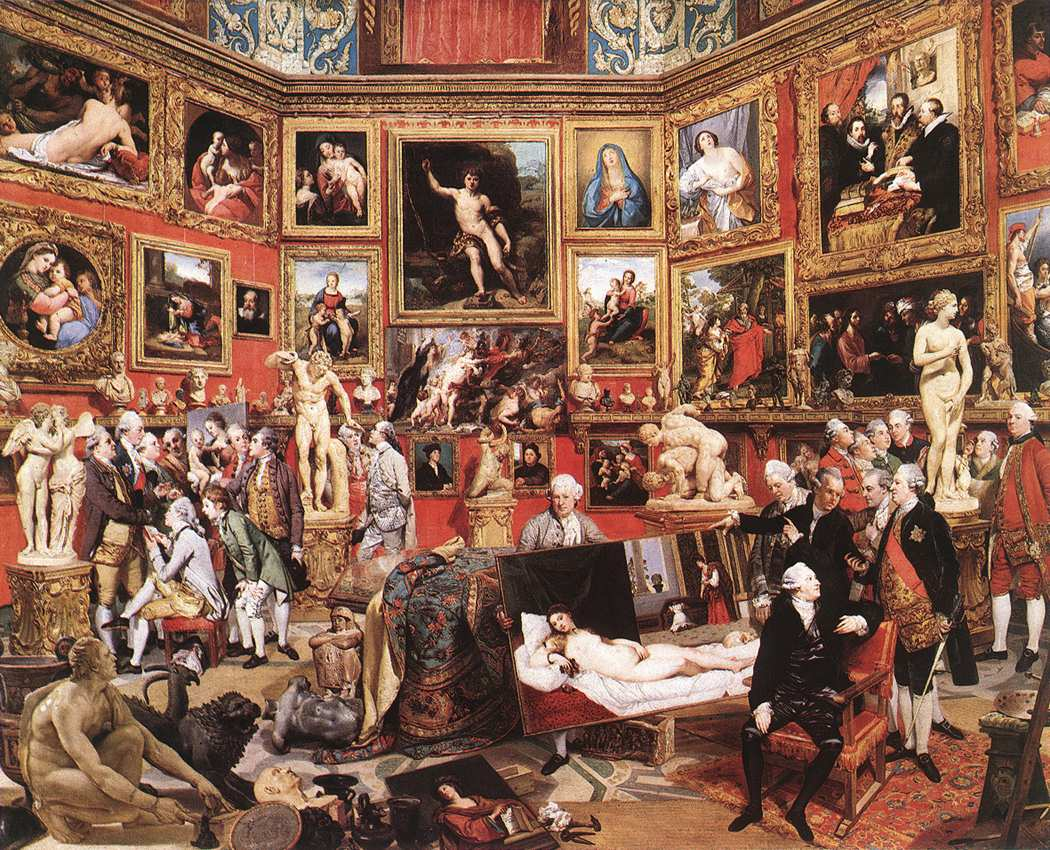
The Tribuna of the Uffizi by Johann Zoffany. Place cursor over artworks or persons to identify them.

Roger Wilbraham FRS (1743 – January 1829) was a British Member of Parliament (MP), bibliophile, antiquary, local historian and a patron of science and the arts. He had an extensive library and he published work on the Cheshire dialect.

== Life ==
Wilbraham was born on 30 December 1743 at Townsend House in Welsh Row in Nantwich. Wilbraham had an elder brother George and another brother named Thomas. His father and his mother, Mary, sent their son to Trinity College, Cambridge. Wilbraham gained a BA, joined the Inner Temple, gained an MA and became a fellow of the college by 1767.

Wilbraham spent a number of years abroad in France, Spain and Italy. He is believed to be one of the British tourists in Florence who were included in Johann Zoffany's painting of the Tribuna of the Uffizi, a royal commission painted in the 1770s. Roger's younger brother, Thomas, is also thought to be in the painting. The Royal Collection, who still own the painting, identify the Wilbraham brothers as probably being in the group on the right who are admiring the statue of the Venus de' Medici.

Wilbraham was elected fellow of the Royal Society on 28 February 1782. In 1784 he stood unsuccessfully to be the Member of Parliament for Truro in Cornwall representing the interests of Sir Francis Bassett. He and Sir Christopher Hawkins, 1st Baronet received an identical number of votes at an election in the Mitchell constituency but Hawkins was awarded the seat. The Mitchell constituency was a rotten borough and Hawkins was involved in this disreputable business of selling seats in parliament. Two years later Wilbraham was elected for the nearby constituency of Helston, representing his mother's family's interests. From 1790 to 1796 he succeeded his brother George Wilbraham as the Member of Parliament for Bodmin. He made eight speeches in parliament and helped to manage the mistaken impeachment of Warren Hastings following his recall from India. Wilbraham also spoke in defence of Edmund Burke and he was also a strong supporter of Charles James Fox.

The head of his mother's family, George Hunt, withdrew his support for Wilbraham's place in parliament and, in an unreformed parliament, Wilbraham failed to be re-elected. His uncle's support had always been lacklustre and Wilbraham was left with his interests in shooting, book collecting and horticulture, although he maintained an interest in politics via correspondence. He had become a fellow of the Society of Antiquaries in 1802 and in 1819 he joined their council. In 1817 he wrote a paper of the dialect of Cheshire which was published by the Society of Antiquaries.

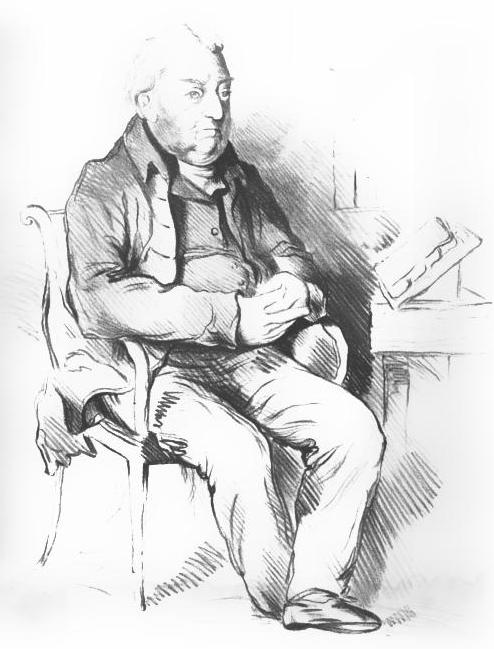
Roger Wilbraham FSA MP FRS an engraving from 1828

Wilbraham was known as a healthy large man of over 20 stone in weight. When out shooting he was known for wearing a red velvet jacket and a white hat. He made good company and he would host parties where guests could admire his knowledge and his library of leather-bound books. Unusually, he fell out with the Italian poet Ugo Foscolo at his own house. Despite Foscolo's further provocation, Wilbraham refused to use harsh words to his own guest, but did promise to speak more freely the following day.

== Legacy ==
Wilbraham was known as an antiquary and for his fine collection of books which included novels, plays, poetry and texts in both Spanish and Italian. After he died in 1829 there was a six-day sale by R. H. Evans (10 June & five following days) of his Belles-lettres. A copy of the sale catalogue is held at Cambridge University Library (shelfmark Munby.c.136(1)). The British National Archives reports that he still has correspondence stored in the Bodleian Library and by Bedford Library archives.

Parliament of Great Britain
Preceded by Lord Hyde; John Rogers (MP)	Member of Parliament for Helston; 1786–1790; With: Sir James Burges, 1st Baronet	Succeeded by Sir Gilbert Elliot, Bt; Stephen Lushington
Preceded by George Wilbraham	Member of Parliament for Bodmin; 1790–1796; With: Sir John Morshead, 1st Baronet	Succeeded by John Nesbitt; Sir John Morshead, 1st Baronet
