= List of country houses in the United Kingdom =

This is intended to be as full a list as possible of country houses, castles, palaces, other stately homes, and manor houses in the United Kingdom and the Channel Islands; any architecturally notable building which has served as a residence for a significant family or a notable figure in history. The list includes smaller castles, abbeys and priories that were converted into a private residence, and also buildings now within urban areas which retain some of their original character, whether now with or without extensive gardens.

== England ==
=== Bedfordshire ===
- Ampthill Park
- Aspley House
- Battlesden House
- Blunham House
- Bozunes Manor
- Bow Brickhill Manor
- Bromham Manor
- Bushmead Priory
- Caddington Hall (demolished 1975)
- Caldecott Manor
- Campton Manor
- Cardington Manor
- Chicksands Priory
- Clophill Manor
- Colworth House
- Cranfield Court (demolished 1934)
- Eaton Manor
- Edworth Manor
- Eggington House
- Flitwick Manor
- Goldington Bury (demolished 1964)
- Harlington Manor
- Harrold Hall (demolished 1961)
- Haynes Park
- Henlow Grange
- Hinwick House
- Hockcliffe Manor
- Houghton House (ruined)
- Ickwell Bury (demolished 1937)
- Luton Hoo
- Mansion House, Old Warden Park
- Milton Ernest Hall
- Moggerhanger House
- Moreteyne Manor
- Odell Castle
- Pavenham Manor (demolished 1960)
- Potton Manor
- Ragons Manor
- Sandy Manor
- Shortmead House
- Silsoe Manor
- Someries Castle (ruined)
- Southill Park
- Stockwood Park (demolished 1964)
- Tempsford Hall
- Toddington Manor
- Turvey Abbey
- Turvey House
- Wardon Manor
- Wavendon Hall
- Willington Manor
- Woburn Abbey
- Wodhull Manor
- Woodcroft Manor
- Woodland Manor Hotel
- Wootton House
- Wrest Park
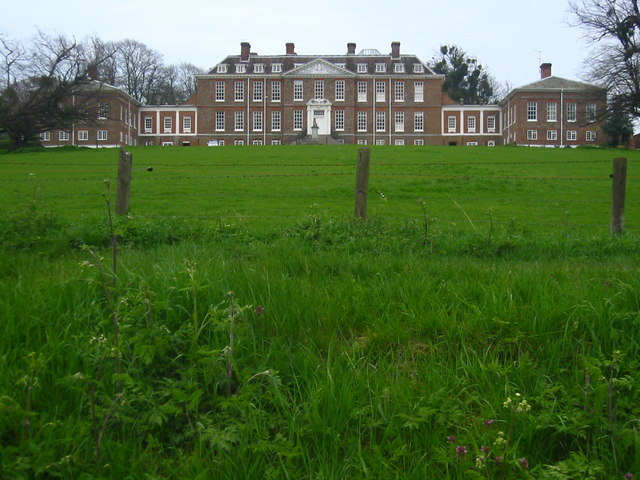
Ampthill Park

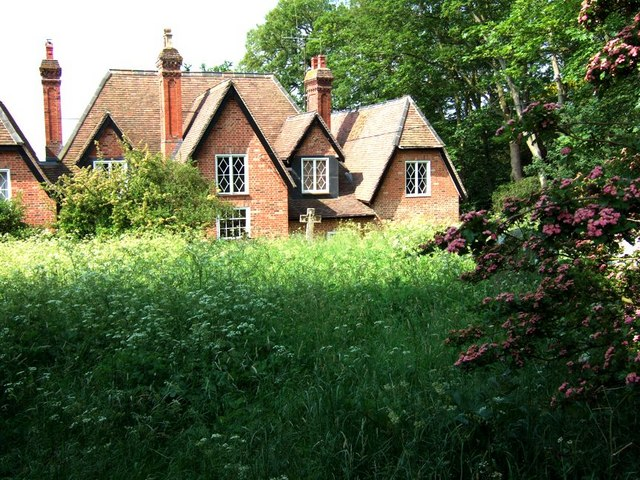
Battlesden House

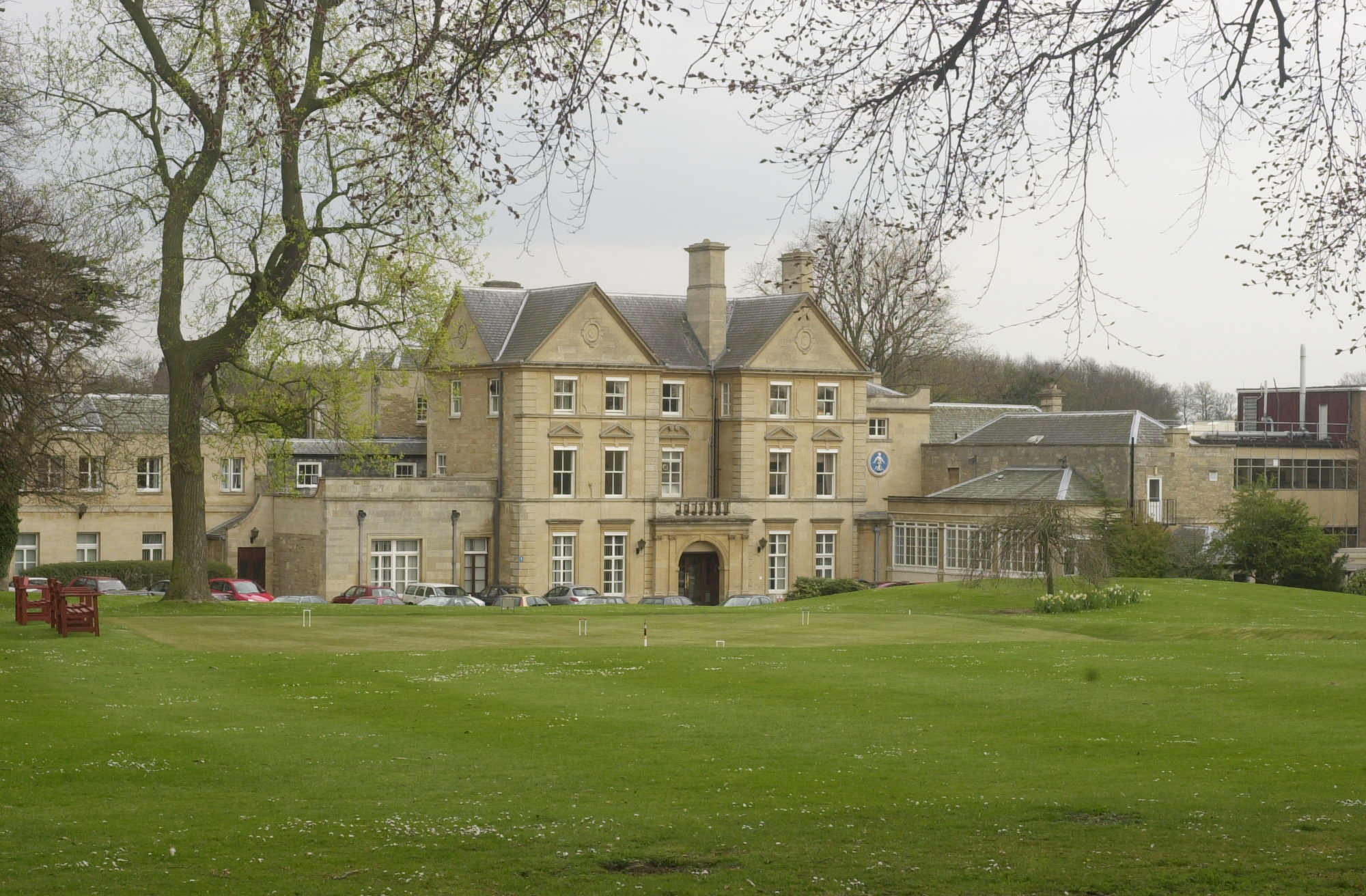
Colworth House

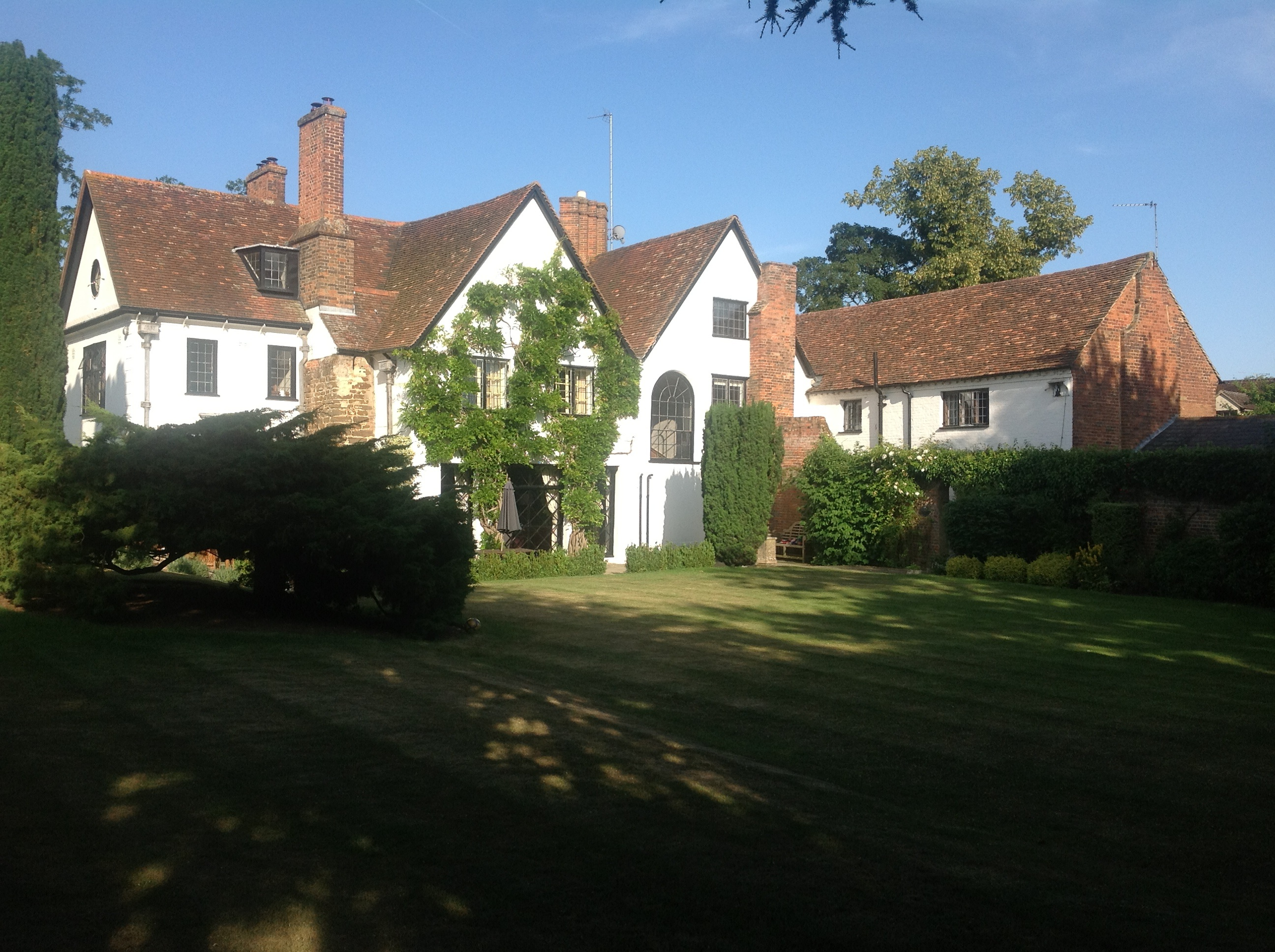
Harlington Manor

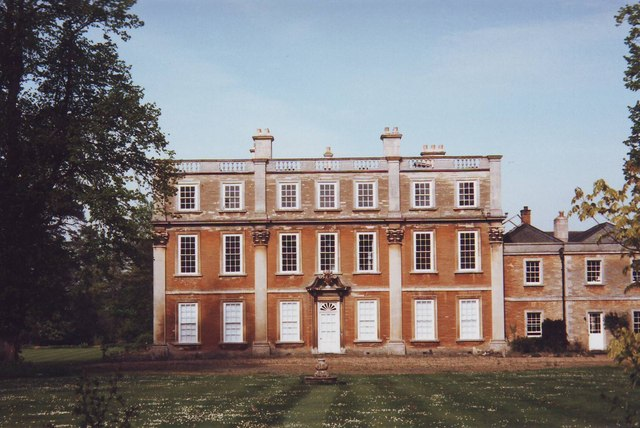
Hinwick House

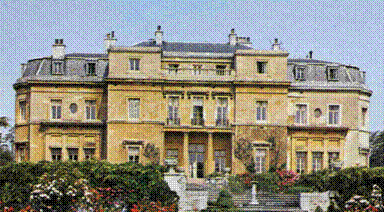
Luton Hoo

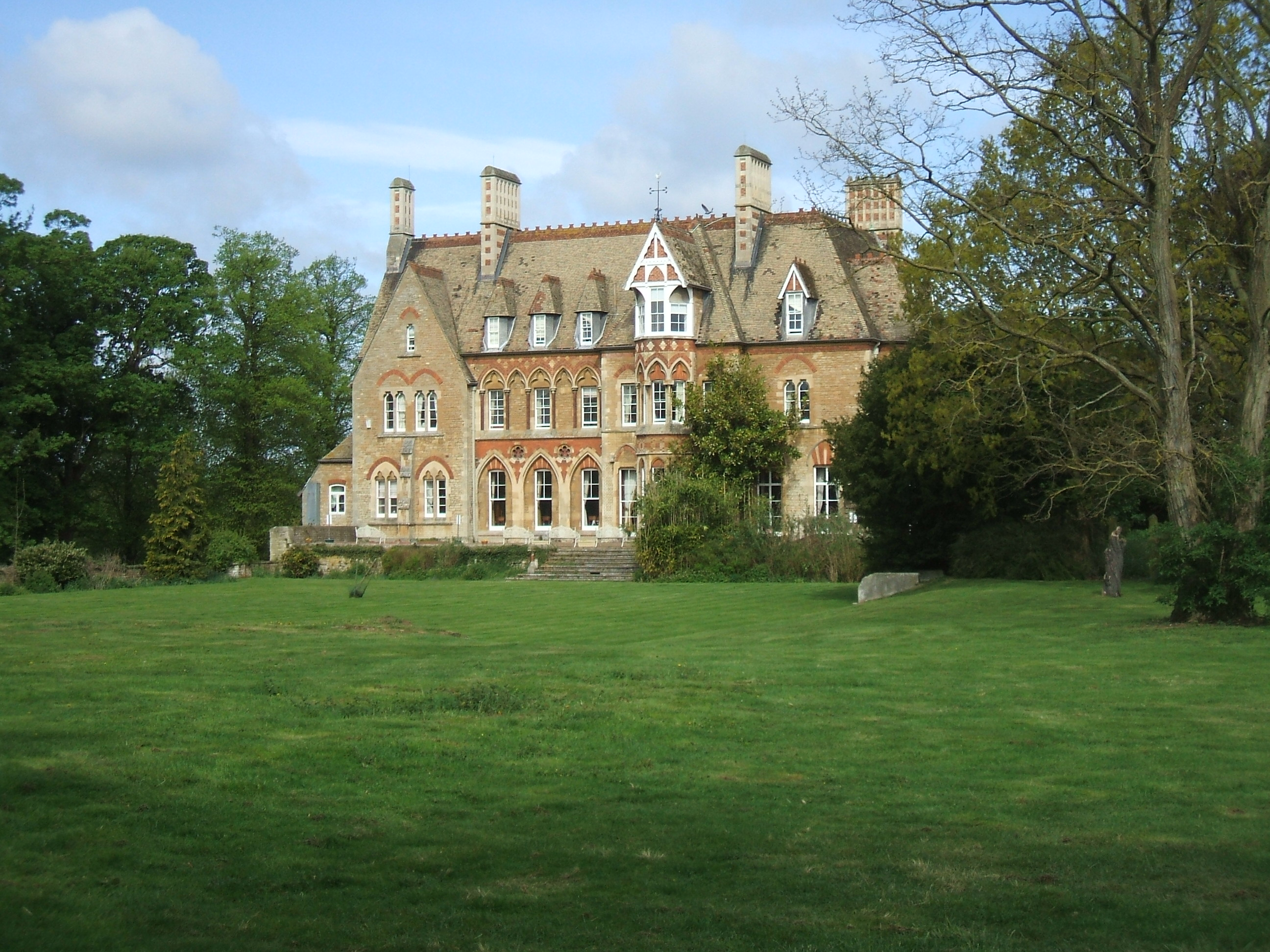
Milton Ernest Hall

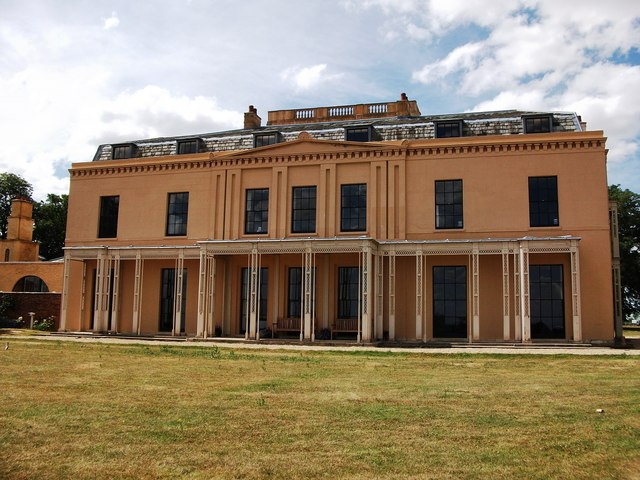
Moggerhanger House

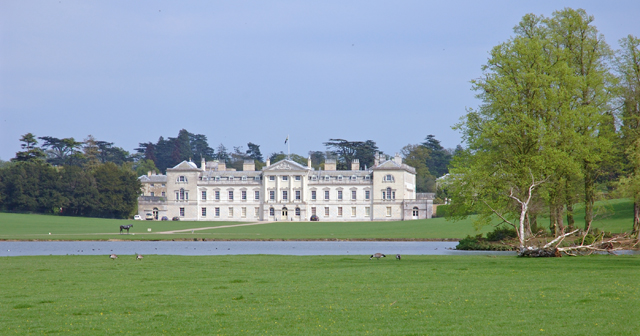
Woburn Abbey

=== Berkshire ===
- Adelaide Cottage
- Aldermaston Court
- Aldin House
- Arborfield Hall (demolished 1955)
- Ascot Heath House (demolished)
- Ascot Place
- Basildon Park
- Baylis House
- Bear Place
- Bearwood House
- Beaumont Lodge
- Benham Park
- Bere Court
- Berystede
- Bill Hill
- Billingbear House (demolished)
- Binfield Lodge
- Binfield Park
- Binfield Place
- Bisham Abbey
- Bowden House
- Bradfield Hall
- Braywick House
- Bucklebury House (demolished)
- Bucklebury Manor
- Bulmershe Court (demolished)
- Bulmershe Manor
- Calcot Park
- Caversham Court
- Caversham Park
- The Cedars, Sunninghill
- Charters House
- Chieveley House
- Chilton Lodge
- Cippenham Moat
- Clewer Park (demolished)
- Coley Park
- Coworth House
- Cranbourne Lodge
- Culham Court
- Cumberland Lodge
- Deanery Garden
- Denford Park
- Devitt House, Pangbourne College
- Ditton Park
- Donnington Grove
- Easthampstead Park
- Elcot Park Hotel
- Englefield House
- Englemere House
- Farley Hall
- Farley Castle
- Fawley Manor
- Fernhill Park
- Foliejon Park
- Folly Farm
- Foxhill House
- Frogmore House
- Great House at Sonning
- Haines Hill
- Hall Place
- Hartley Court
- Hinton House
- Holme Park
- Hungerford Park (demolished 1960)
- Hurst House
- Hurst Lodge
- Lady Place (demolished 1837)
- Inholmes House
- Inkpen House
- Lock's House
- Kirby House
- Lullebrook Manor
- Oldfield Lodge
- Maidenhatch
- Manor House, Great Shefford
- Marlston House
- New Lodge, Winkfield
- Oakley Court
- The Oaks
- Ockwells
- The Old Rectory, Burghfield
- Padworth House
- Park Place
- Prior's Court, Chieveley
- The Priory, Beech Hill
- The Priory, Old Windsor
- Prospect Park
- Purley Hall
- Purley Park
- Rooksnest
- Royal Lodge
- St Leonard's
- St Leonard's Dale
- St Leonard's Hill (demolished 1924)
- Sandleford Priory
- Shaw House
- Shottesbrooke Park
- Silwood Park
- Sindlesham Court
- Sonning Bishop's Palace
- South Hill Park
- Stanlake Park
- Streatley House
- Sulhamstead House
- Sunningdale Park
- Sunninghill Park
- Swallowfield Park
- Swinley Park
- Tetworth Hall
- Tittenhurst Park
- Ufton Court
- Upton Court
- Wallingtons
- Warfield Hall
- Welford Park
- West Woodhay House
- Windsor Castle
- Wokefield Park
- Woodside, Old Windsor
- Woolhampton House
- Woolley Park
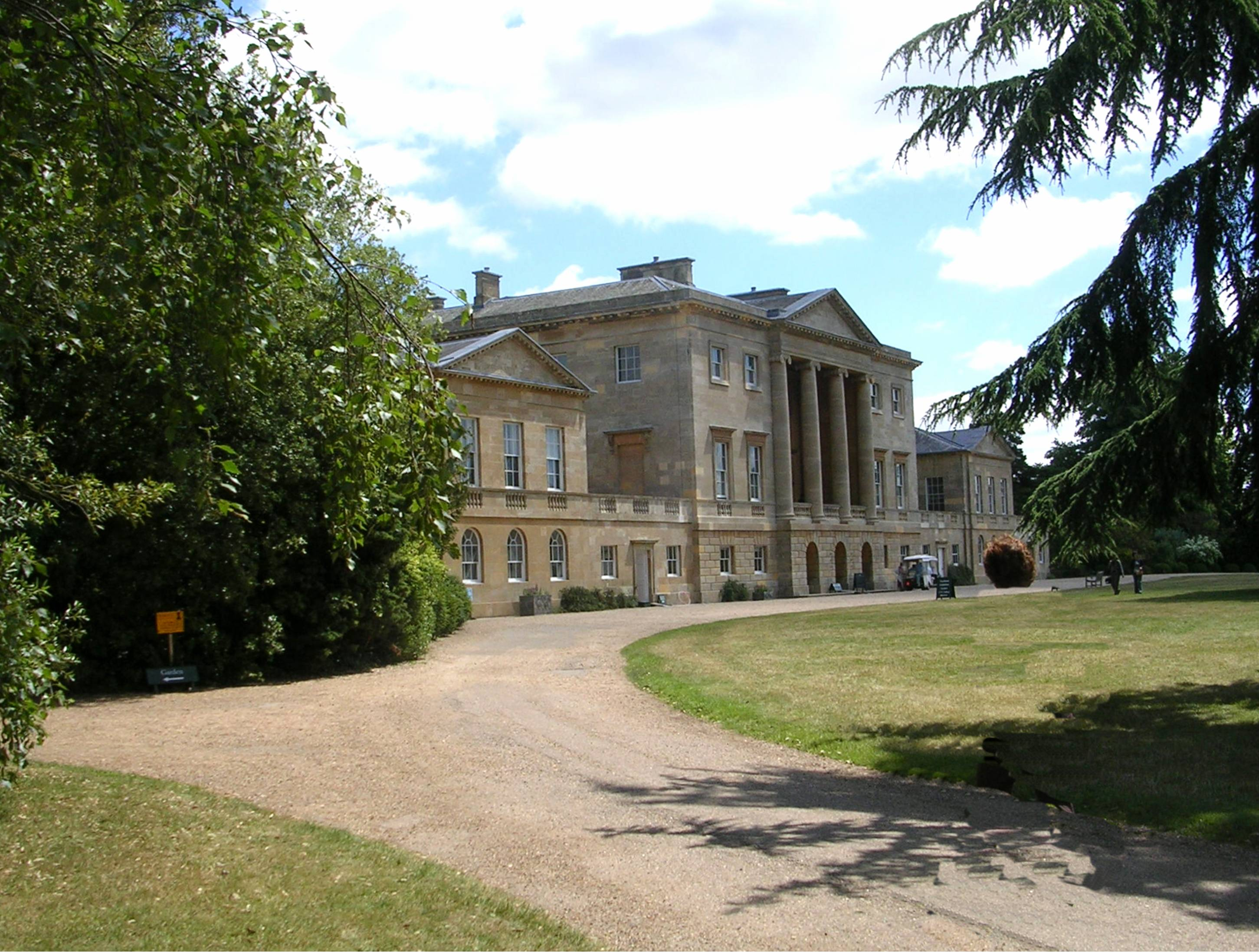
Basildon Park

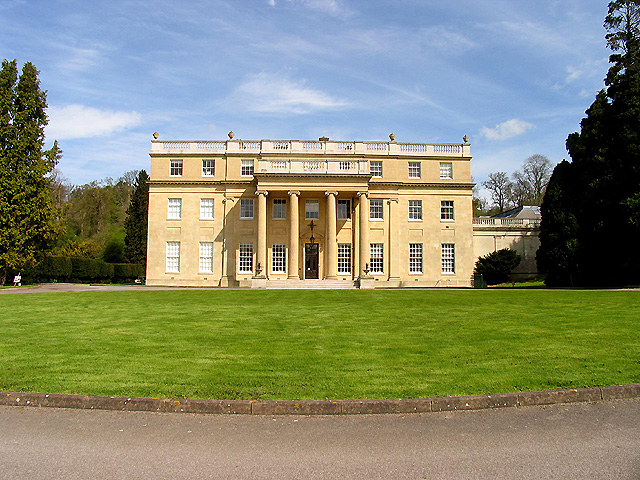
Benham Park

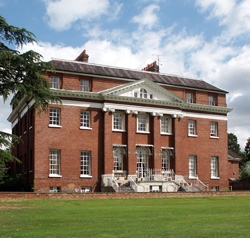
Calcot Park

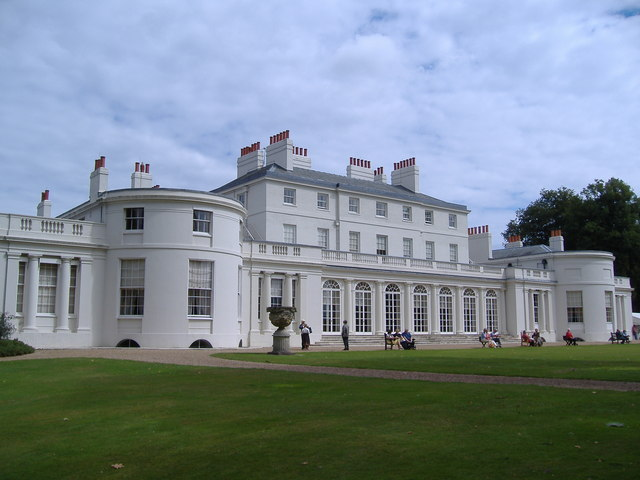
Frogmore House

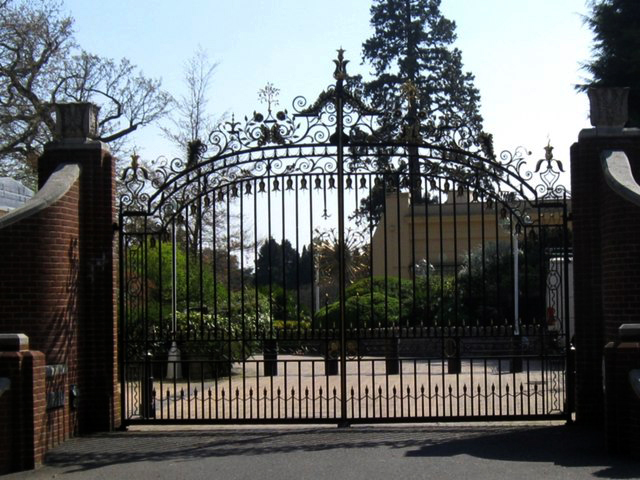
Tittenhurst Park

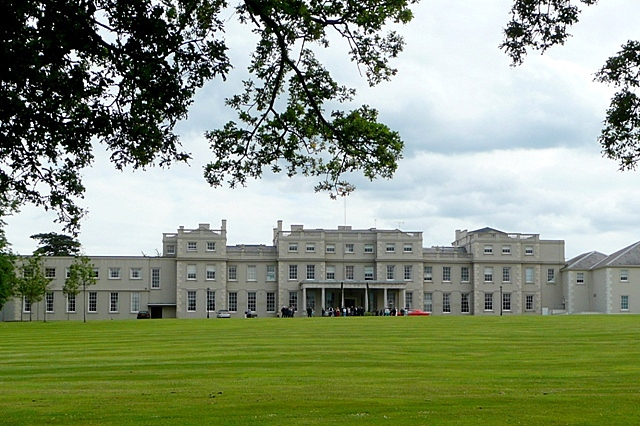
Wokefield Park

=== City of Bristol ===
- Blaise Castle
- Brentry House
- Burfleld House (demolished)
- Clifton Hill House
- The Dower House, Stoke Park
- Engineers House
- Goldney Hall
- Kings Weston House
- Long Fox Manor (formerly Brislington House)
- Merchant Hall
- Red Lodge Museum
- Redland Court
- Royal Fort House
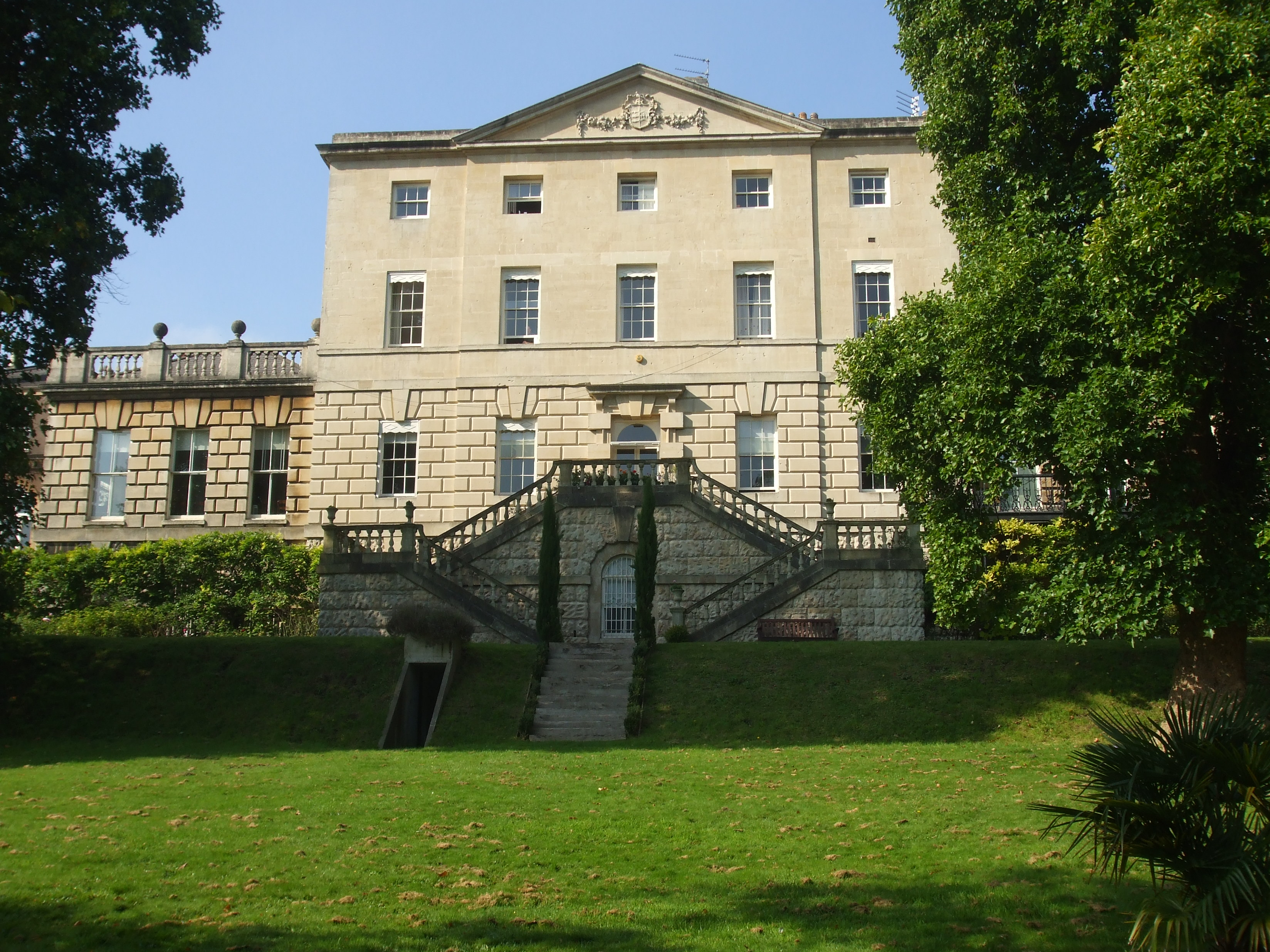
Clifton Hill House

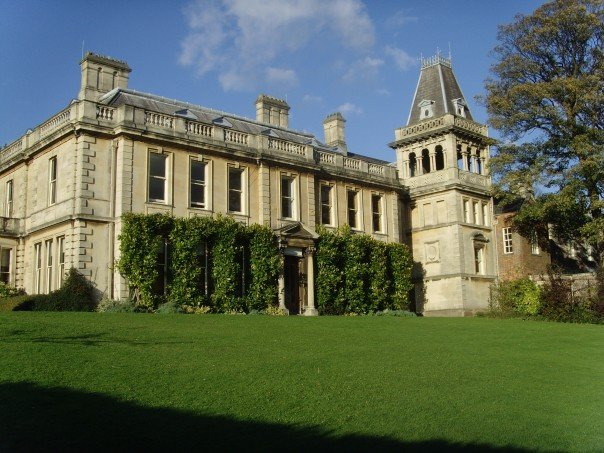
Goldney Hall

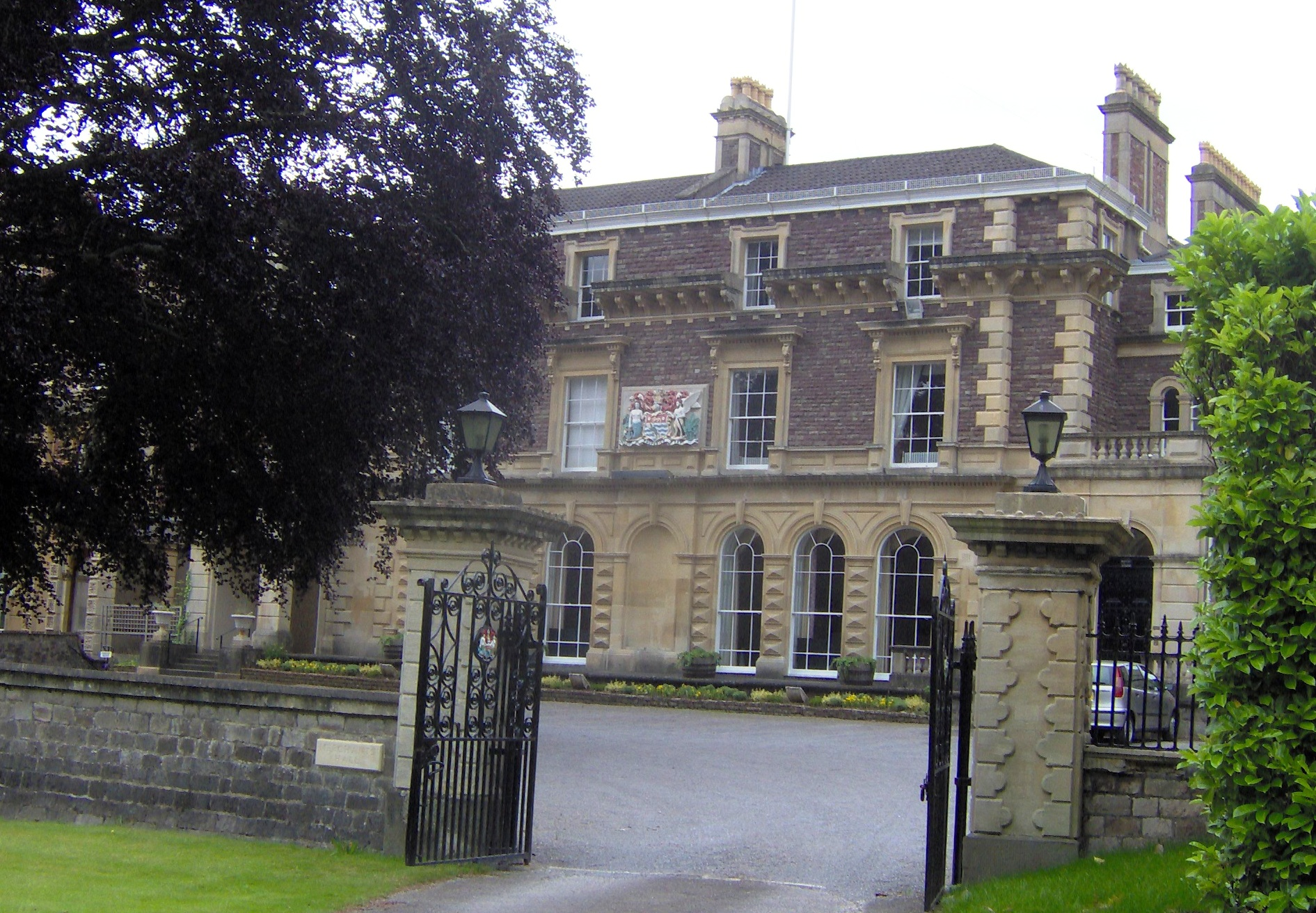
Merchant Hall

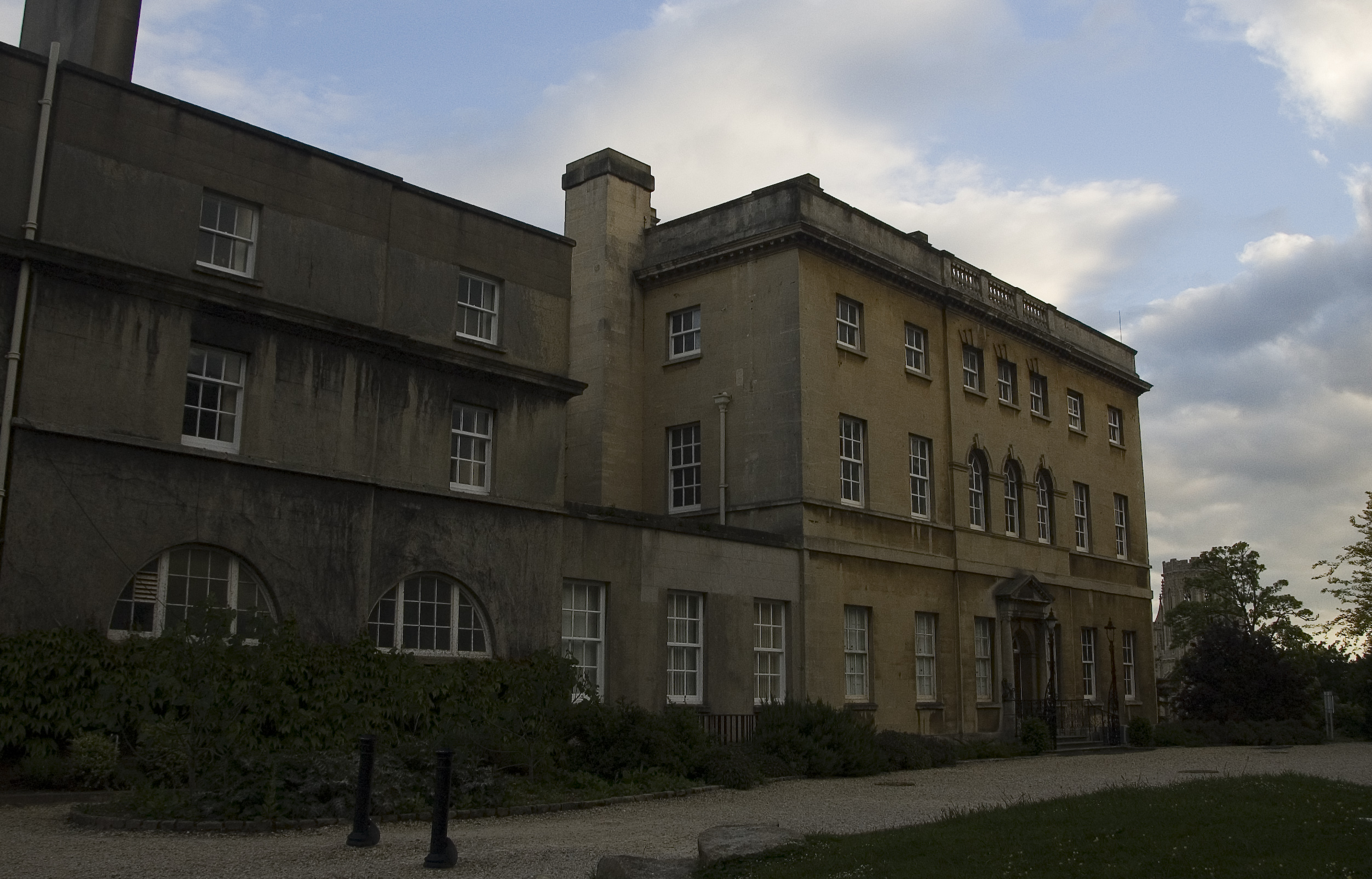
Royal Fort House

=== Buckinghamshire ===
- The Abbey, Aston Abbotts
- Ascott House
- Aston Clinton House
- Biddlesden Park
- Bletchley Park
- Boarstall Tower
- Bulstrode Park
- Chalfont Park
- Chenies Manor House
- Chequers
- Chicheley Hall
- Cholesbury Manor House
- Claydon House
- Cliveden
- Coppins
- Court Garden House
- Danesfield House
- Denham Place
- Ditton Park
- Dorney Court
- Dorneywood
- Dorton House
- Dropmore Park
- Eythrope
- Fawley Court
- Gayhurst House
- The Grange, Chalfont St Peter (demolished)
- Greenlands
- Hall Barn
- Halton House
- Hampden House
- Hanslope Park House
- Harleyford Manor
- Hartwell House
- Heatherden Hall
- Hedsor House
- Horwood House
- Hughenden Manor
- Hyde House
- Iver Grove
- Langley Park House
- Latimer House
- Marlow Place
- Mentmore Towers
- Milton's Cottage
- Missenden Abbey
- Nashdom
- Nether Winchendon House
- Newland Park
- Notley Abbey
- Penn House, Penn Street
- Remnantz
- Shardeloes
- Shrubs Wood
- Stoke Place
- Stowe House
- Taplow Court
- Tyringham Hall
- Tythrop Park
- Waddesdon Manor
- Welders House
- West Wycombe Park
- Westhorpe House
- Whaddon Hall
- Wilton Park House (demolished)
- Winslow Hall
- Wormsley Park
- Wotton House
- Wycombe Abbey
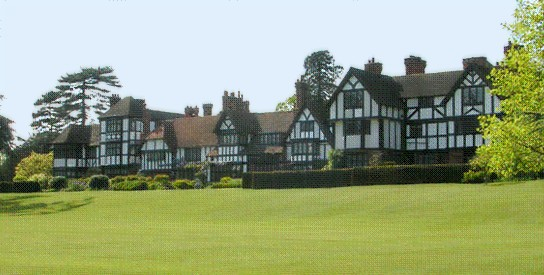
Ascott House

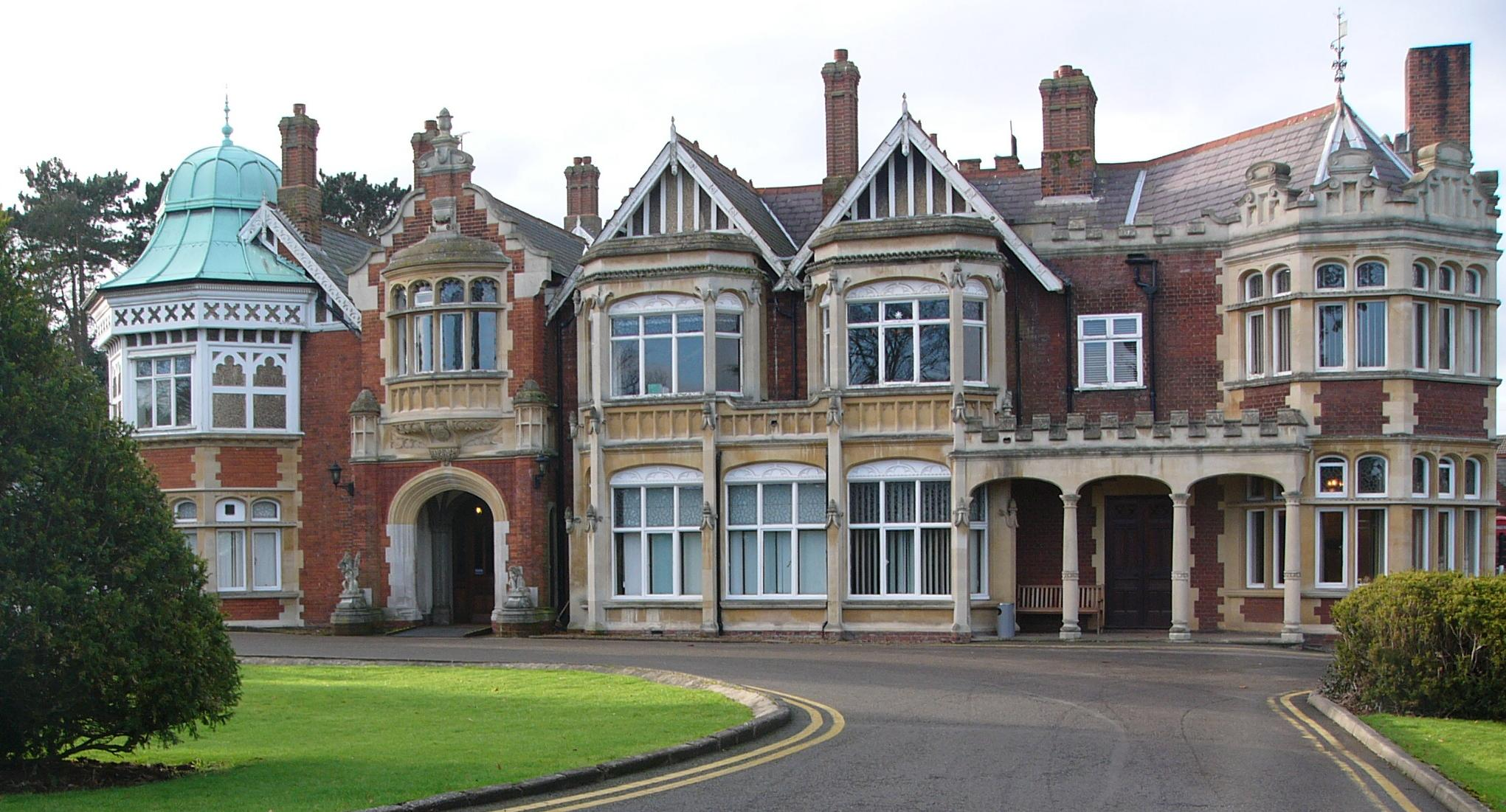
Bletchley Park

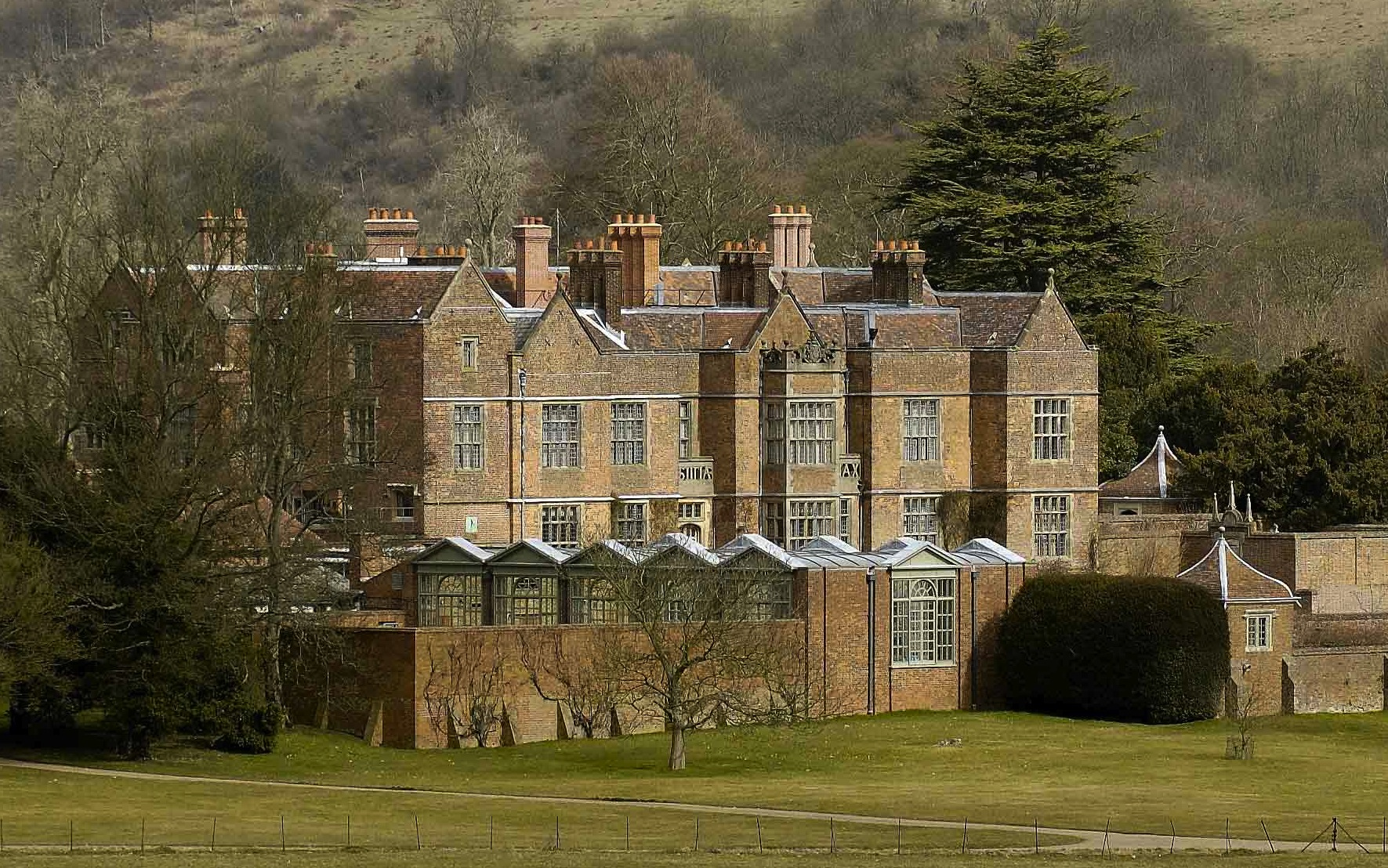
Chequers

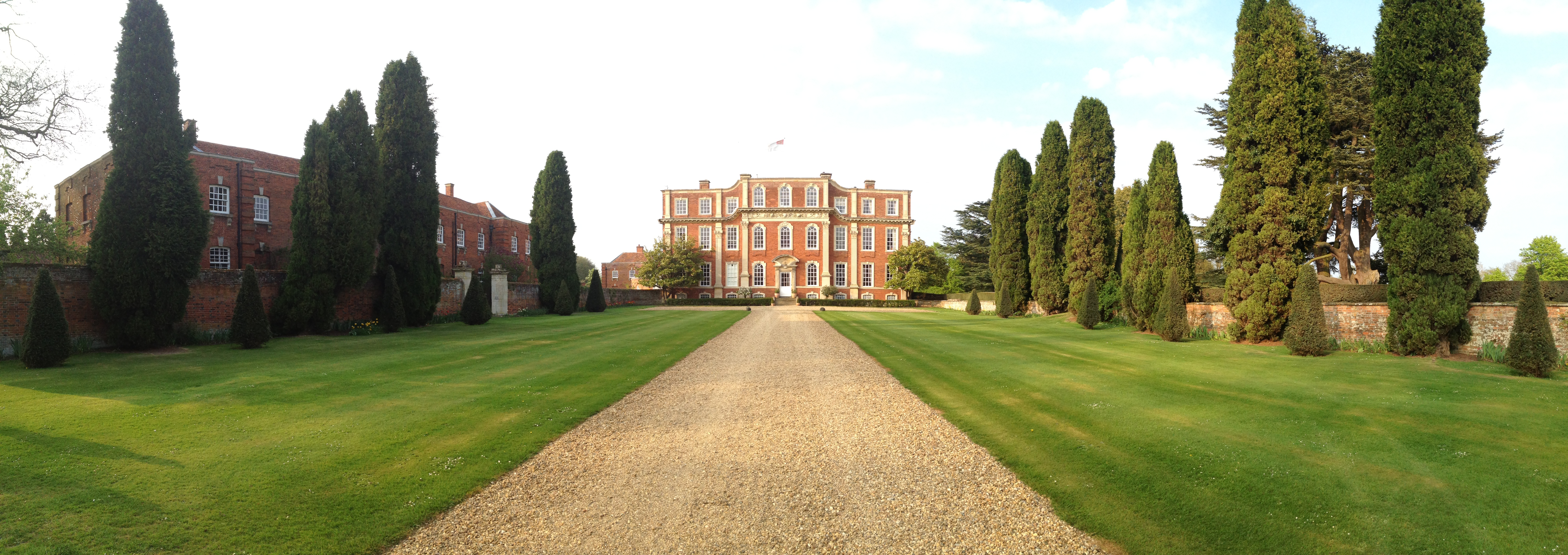
Chicheley Hall

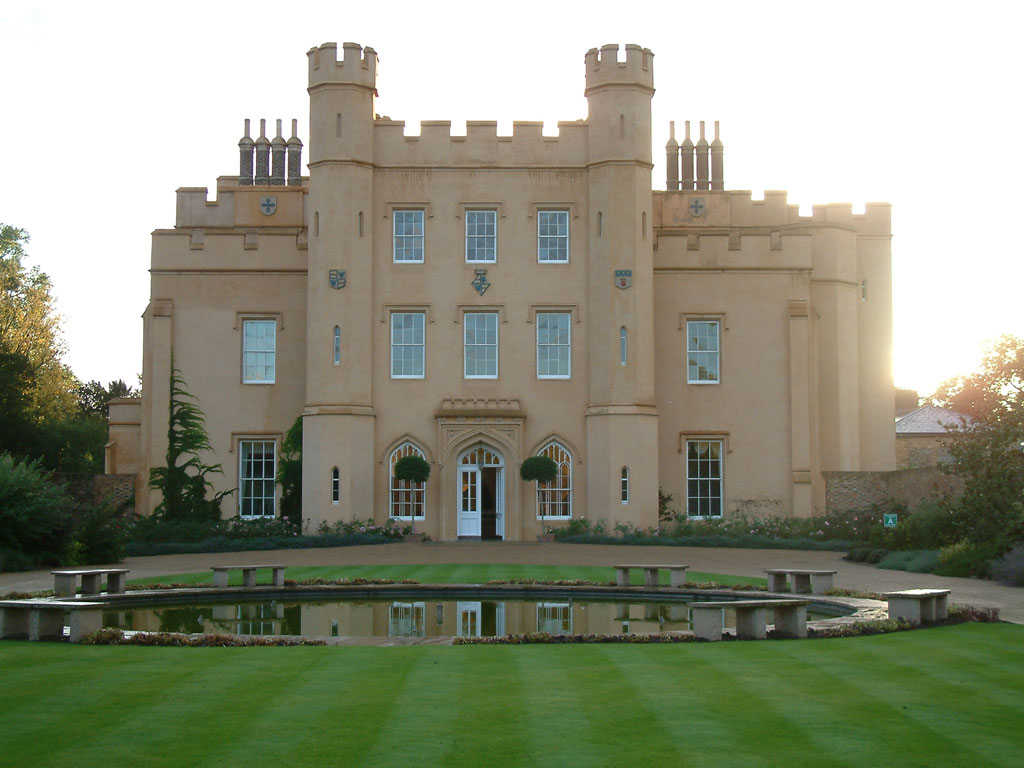
Ditton Park

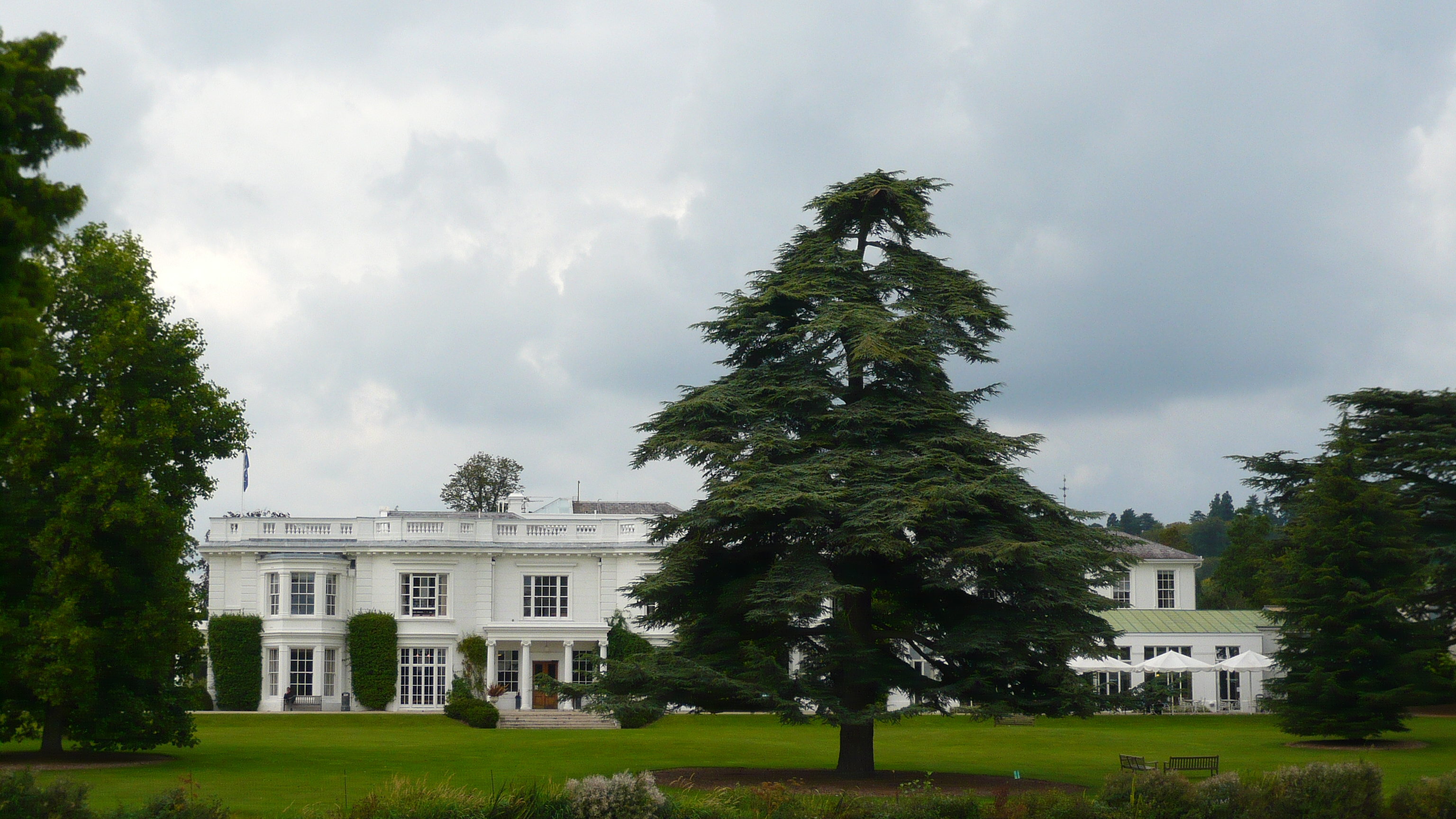
Greenlands

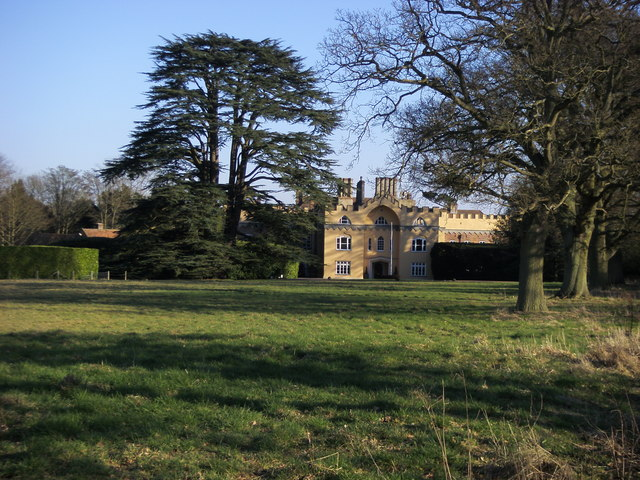
Hampden House

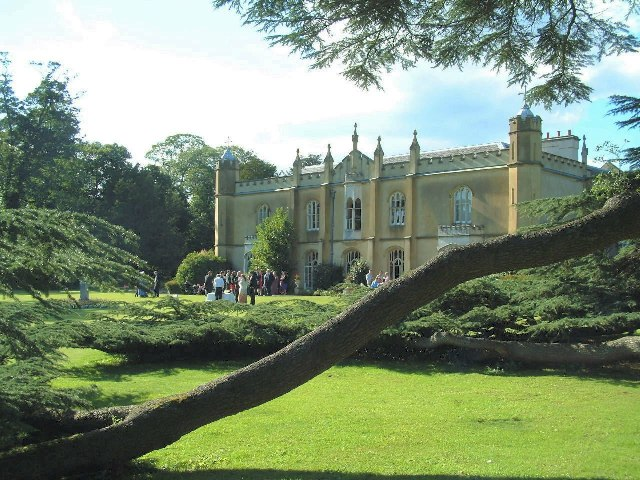
Missenden Abbey

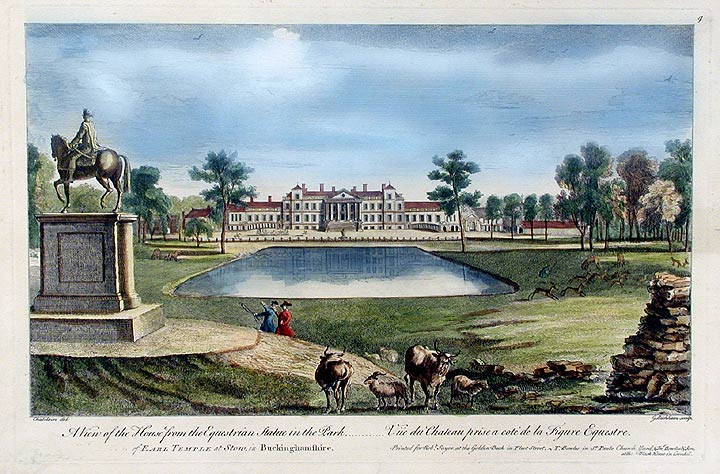
Stowe House

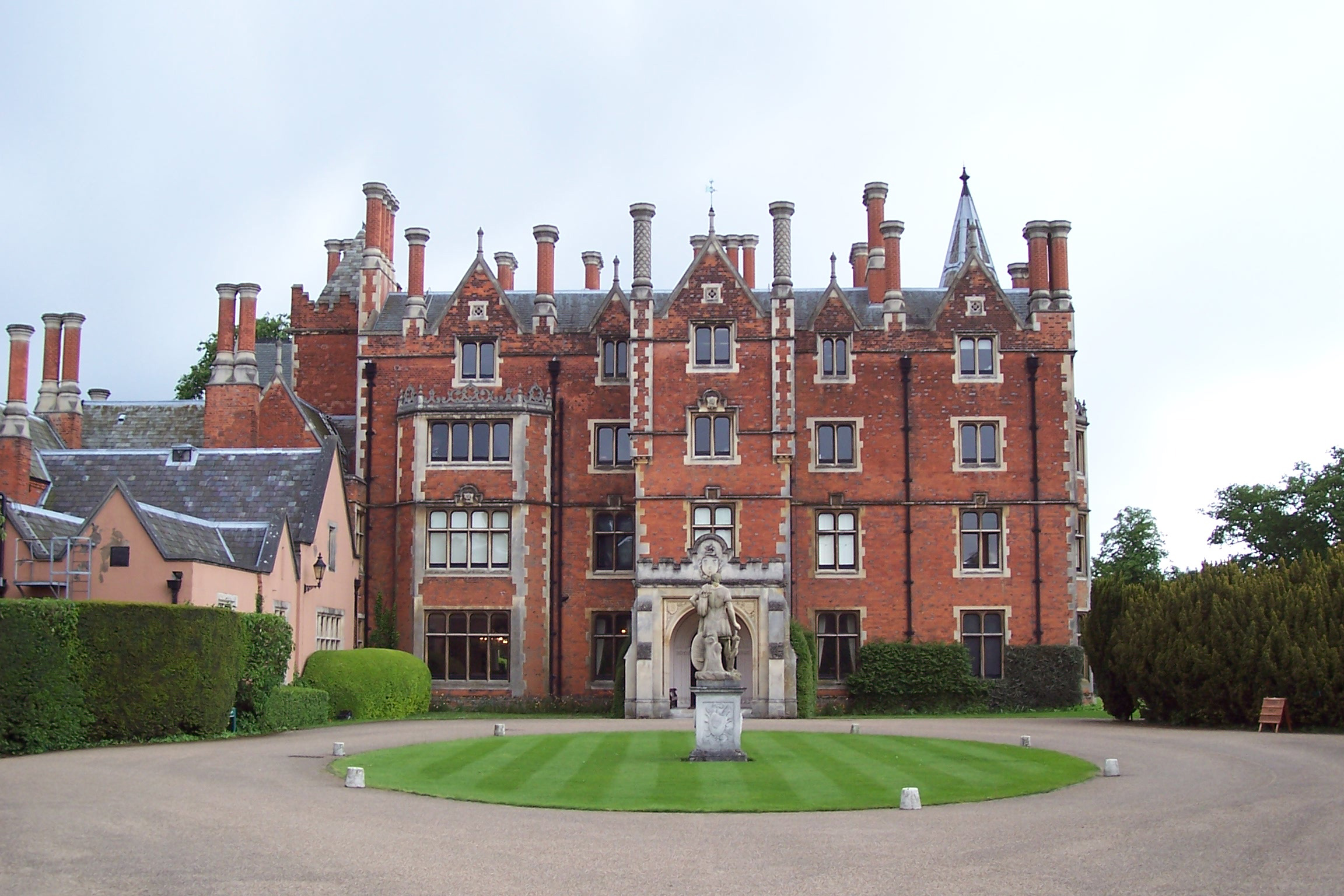
Taplow Court

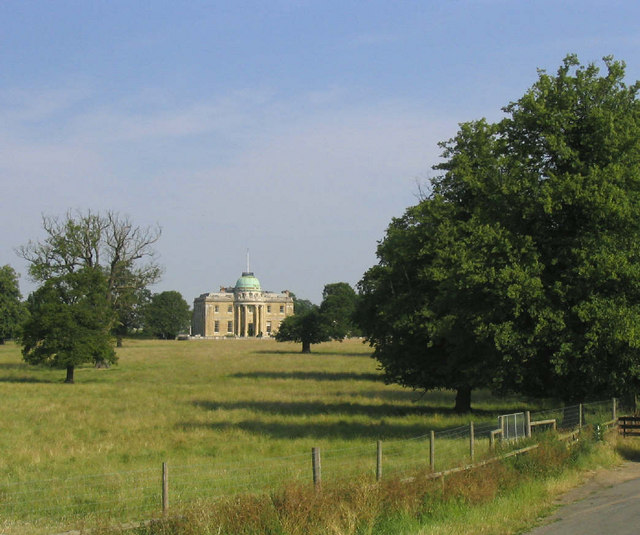
Tyringham Hall

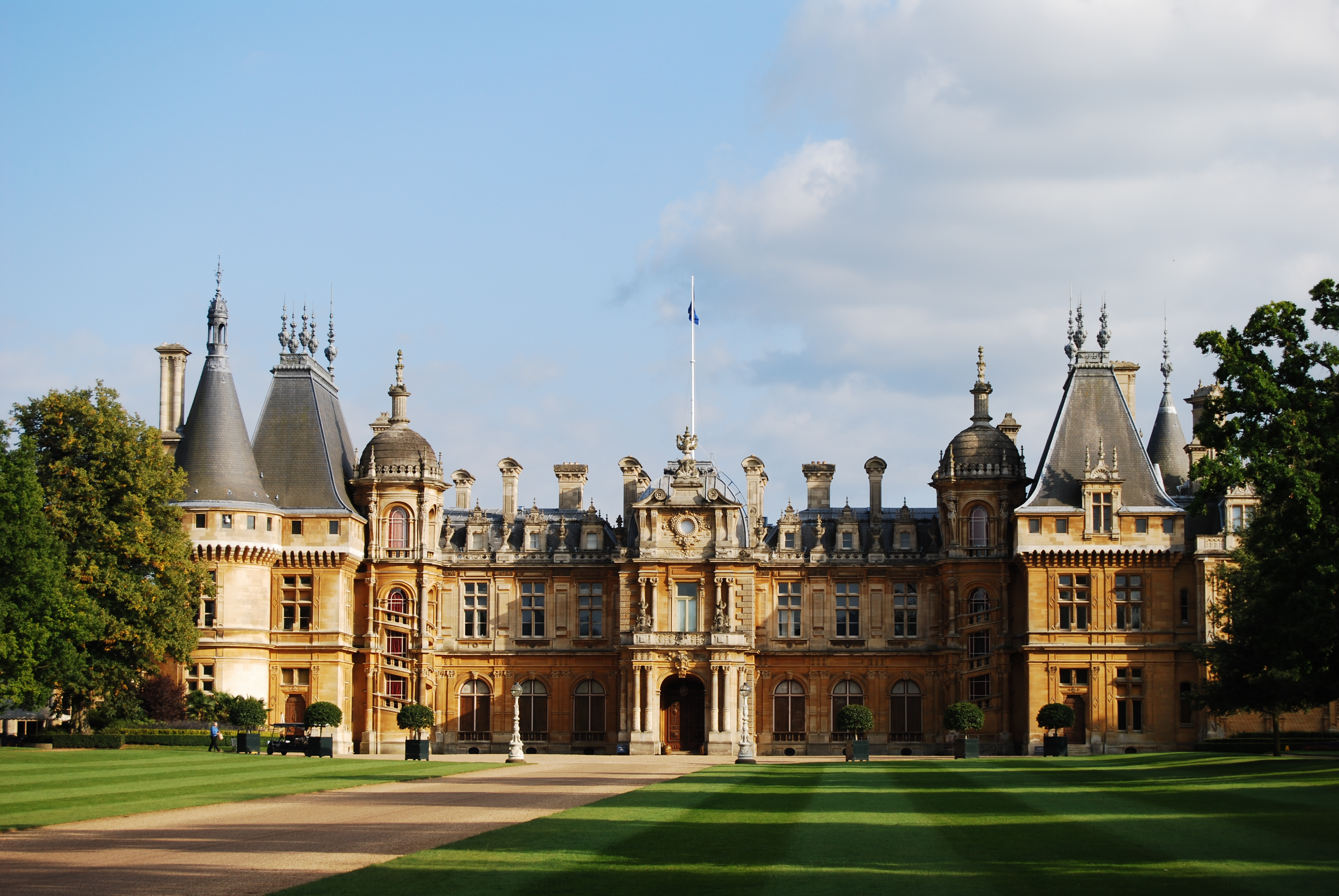
Waddesdon Manor

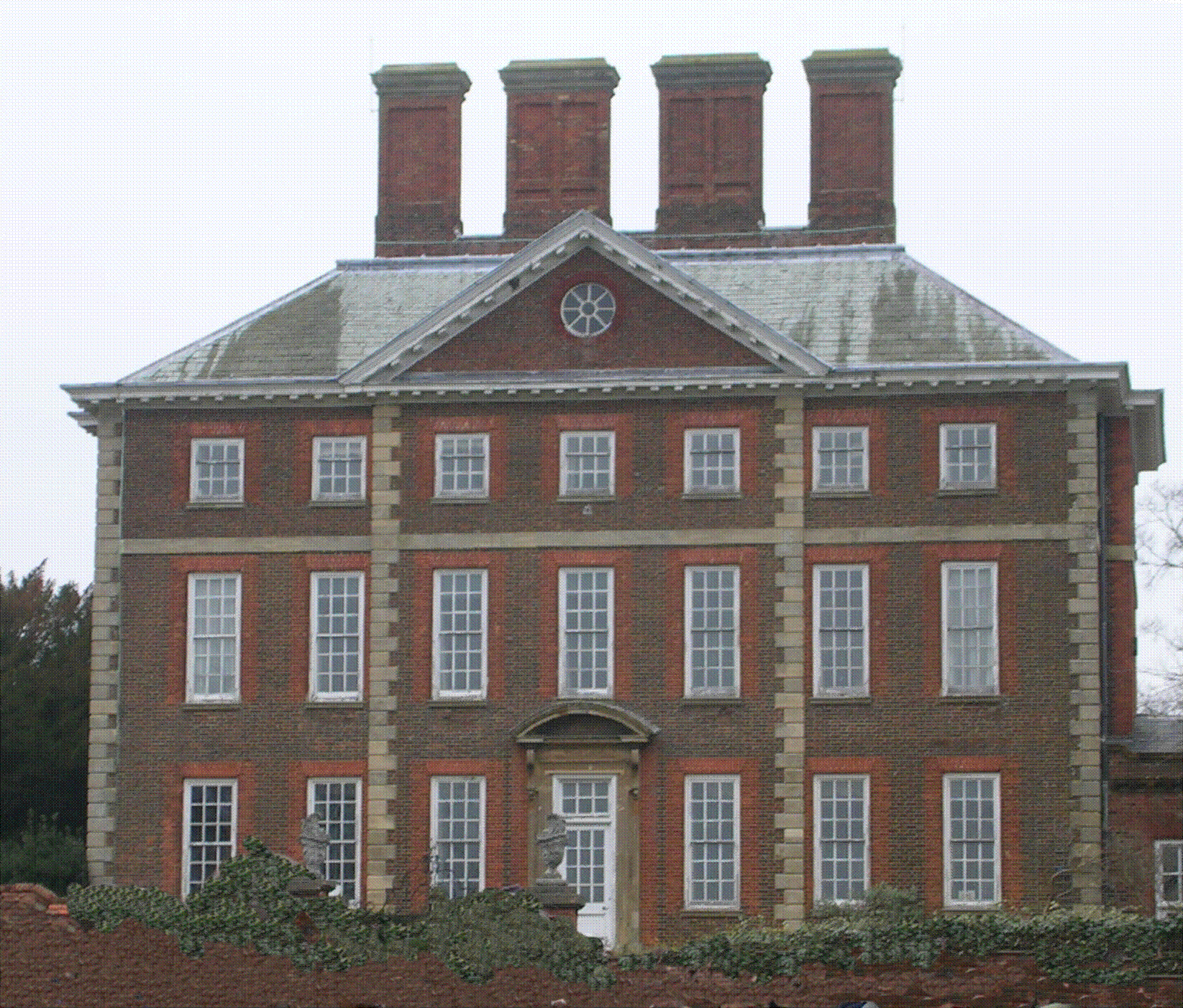
Winslow Hall

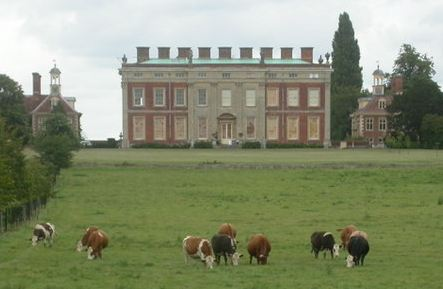
Wotton House

=== Cambridgeshire ===
- The Abbey, Swaffham Bulbeck
- Anglesey Abbey
- Bottisham Hall
- Bourn Hall
- Buckden Towers
- Burghley House
- Cherry Hinton Hall
- Chippenham Park
- Elton Hall
- Farm Hall
- Fulbourn Manor
- Gaynes Hall
- Harston House
- Haslingfield Hall
- Hilton Hall
- Hinchingbrooke House
- Holmewood Hall
- Island Hall
- Kimbolton Castle
- Kirtling Tower
- Leverington Hall
- Longthorpe Tower
- Madingley Hall
- The Manor, Hemingford Grey
- Manor House, Papworth St Agnes
- Marshall House, Cambridge
- Middlefield
- Milton Hall
- Northborough Castle
- Odsey House
- The Old Manor House, Swavesey
- Pampisford Hall
- Peckover House
- Quy Hall
- Ramsey Abbey House
- Sawston Hall
- Spinney Abbey
- Stibbington Hall
- Thorney Abbey House
- Thorpe Hall
- Toseland Hall
- Ufford Hall
- Walcot Hall
- Wandlebury House (demolished 1956)
- Wimpole Hall
- Woodcroft Castle
- Wothorpe Towers (dismantled)
- Zouches Manor (Dunmowes Manor) (demolished)
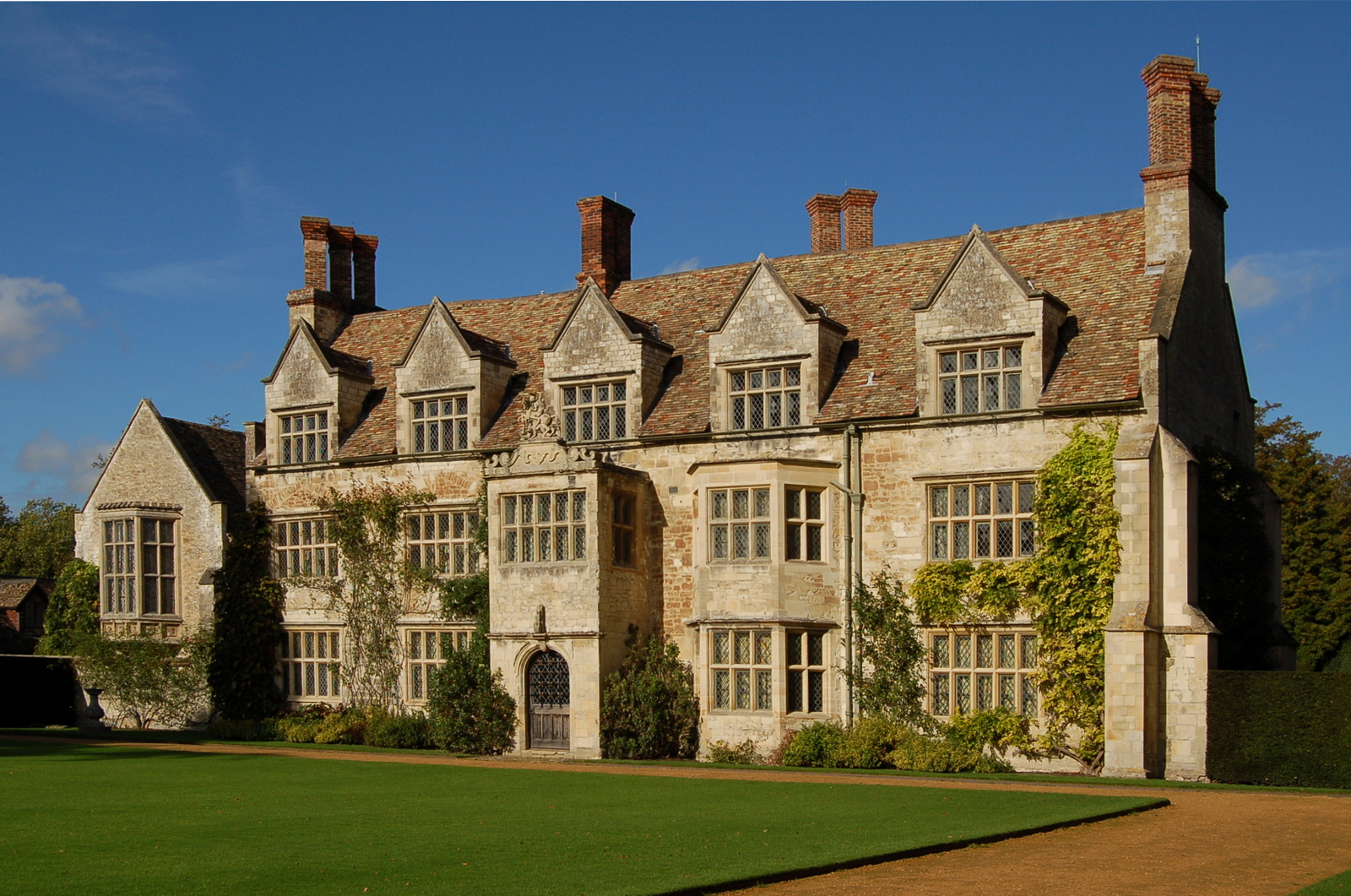
Anglesey Abbey

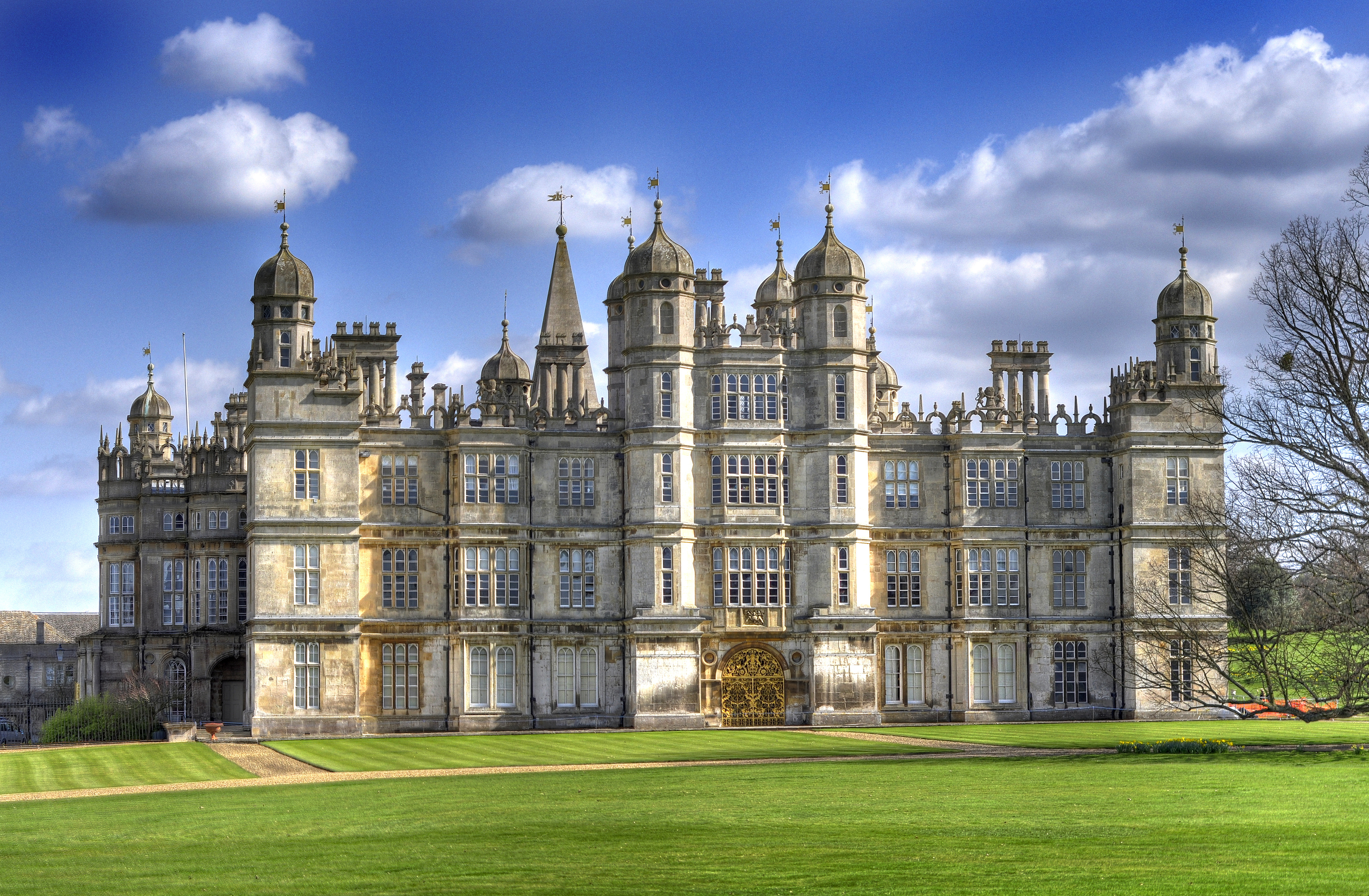
Burghley House

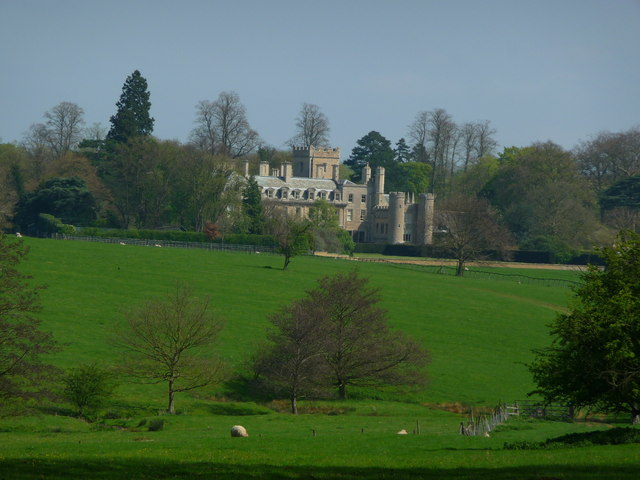
Elton Hall

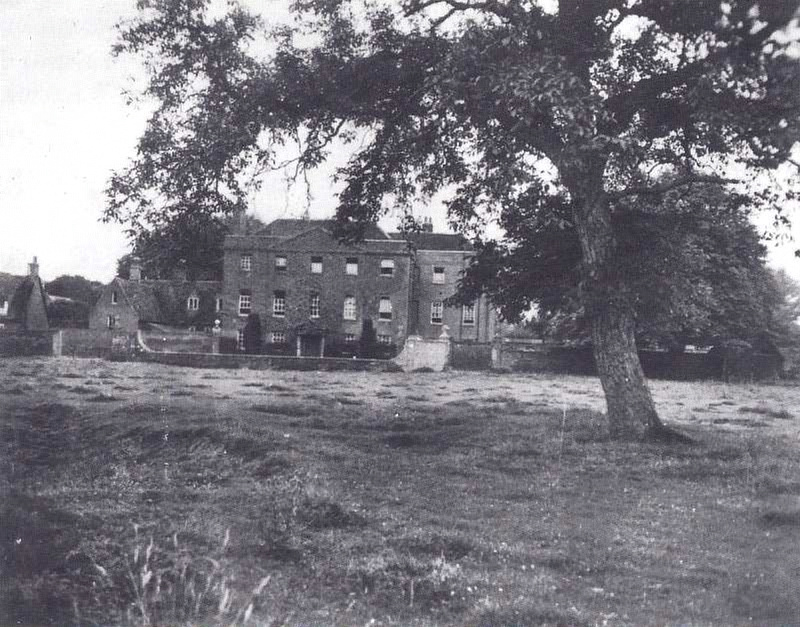
Farm Hall

Gaynes Hall

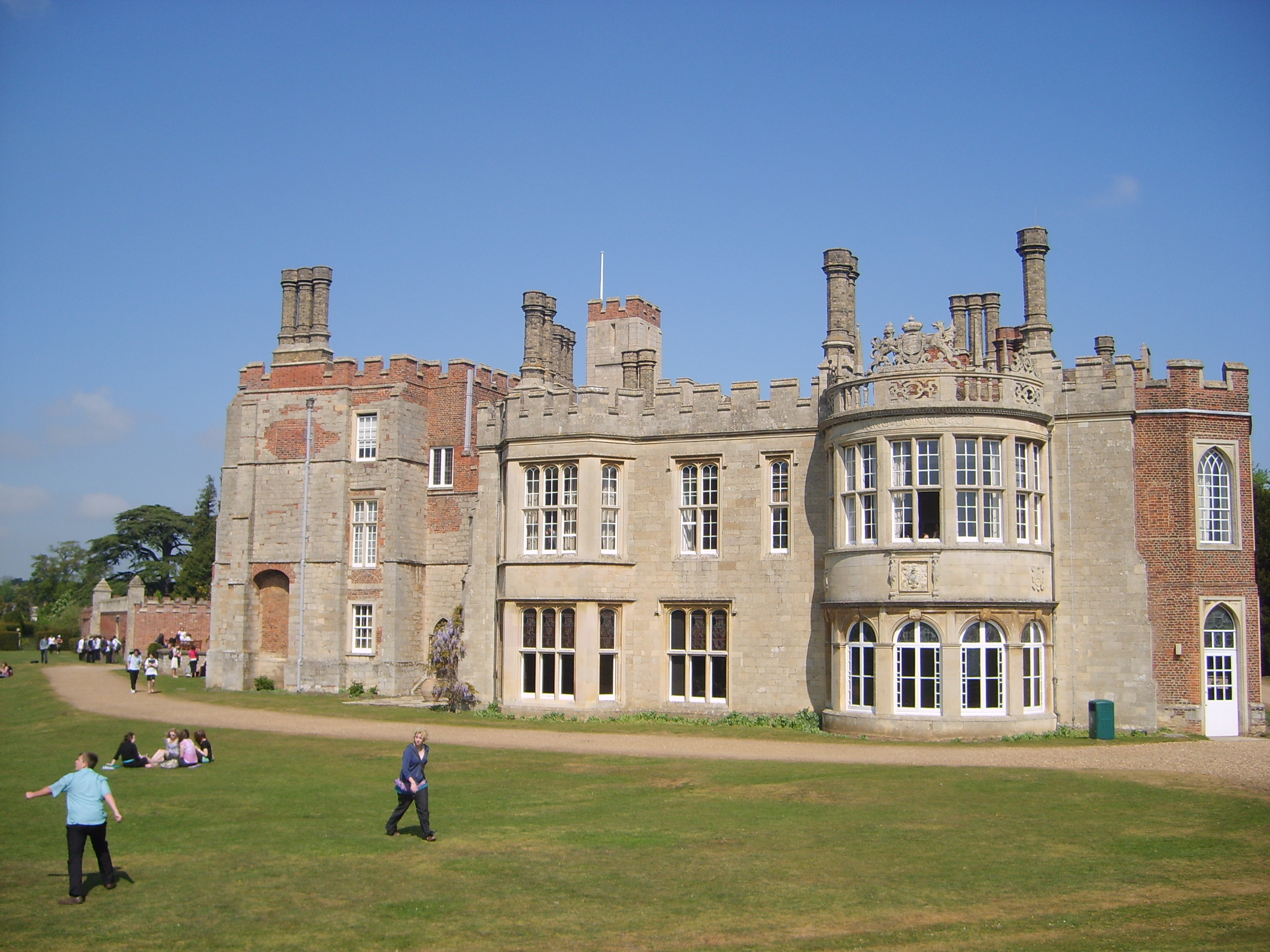
Hinchingbrooke House

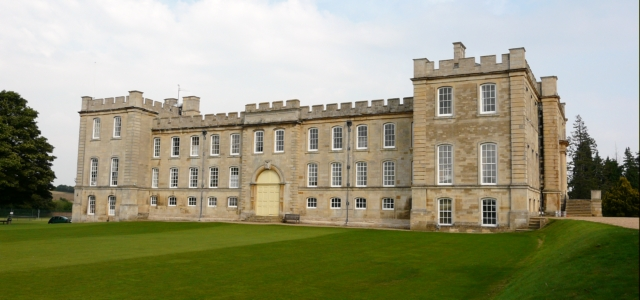
Kimbolton Castle

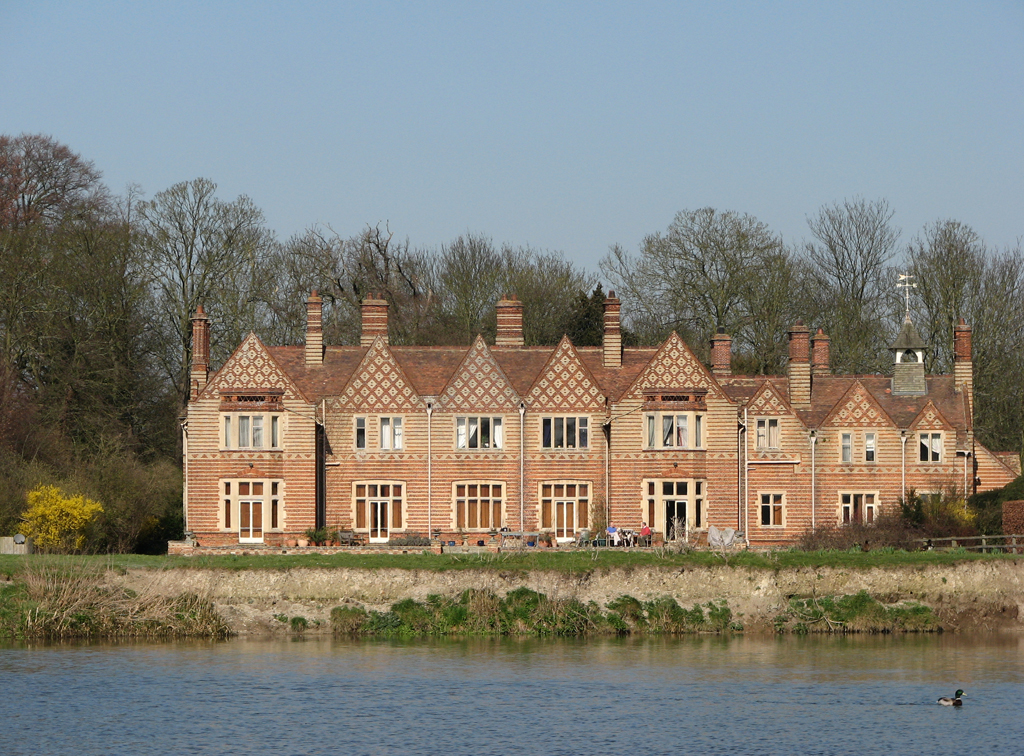
Quy Hall

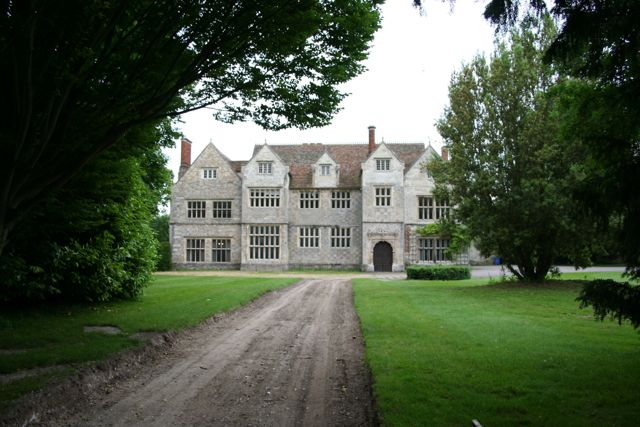
Sawston Hall

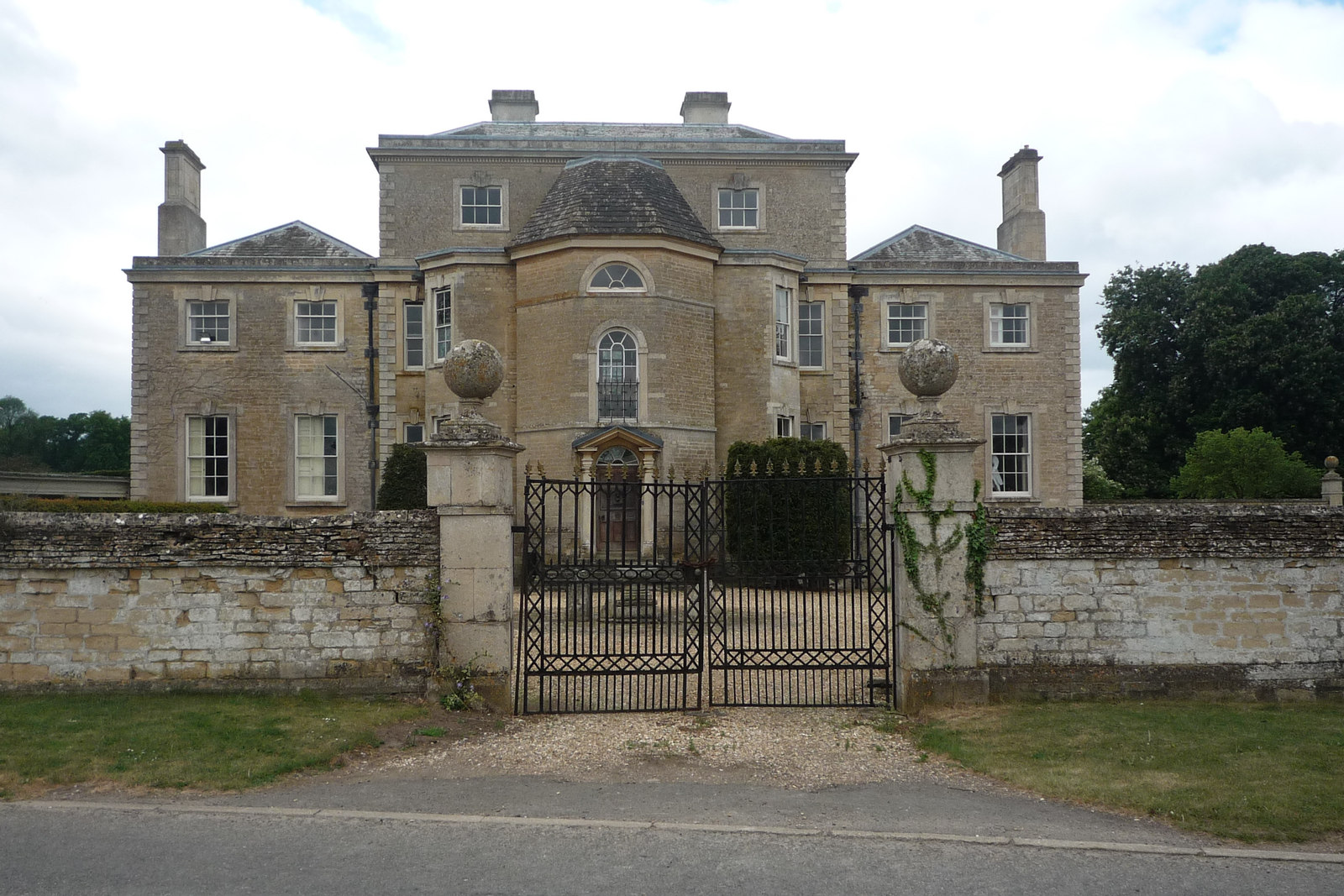
Ufford Hall

=== Cheshire ===
- Abbotsford
- Adlington Hall
- Alderley Old Hall
- Alderley Park
- Aldford Hall
- Alvanley Hall
- Antrobus Hall
- Arley Hall
- Ashley Hall
- Astle Hall (demolished)
- Aston Park
- Austerson Old Hall
- Bache Hall
- Backford Hall
- Baddiley Hall
- Barrow Hall
- Bear and Billet
- Beeston Towers
- Belgrave Lodge
- Belmont Hall
- Betchton Hall
- Bexton Hall
- Birtles Hall
- Blackden Hall
- Blackden Manor
- Bolesworth Castle
- Bonis Hall
- Booth Mansion
- Bostock Hall
- Boughton Hall
- Bramhall Hall
- Bradwall Hall (demolished 1960)
- Brereton Hall
- Broxton Old Hall
- Buglawton Hall
- Bulkeley Grange
- Bulkeley Hall
- Burton Hall
- Burton Manor
- Butley Hall
- Calveley Hall
- Capesthorne Hall
- Castle Park House
- Checkley Hall
- Chelford Manor House
- Cholmondeley Castle
- Chorley Old Hall
- Chorlton Hall, Backford
- Chorlton Hall, Malpas
- Chorlton Old Hall
- Christleton Hall
- Christleton Old Hall
- Churche's Mansion
- Churton Hall
- Clonterbrook House
- Cogshall Hall
- Colshaw Hall
- Combermere Abbey
- Cowper House
- Crabwall Hall
- Crag Hall
- Cranage Hall
- Crewe Hall
- Crewe Hill
- Crewood Hall
- Daresbury Hall
- Davenham Hall
- Dee Hills House
- Doddington Hall
- Dorfold Hall
- Duddon Old Hall
- Dukenfield Hall
- Dunham Massey
- Eaton Hall
- Eccleston Hill
- Eccleston Paddocks
- Edge Hall
- Endon Hall
- The Falcon, Chester
- Fulshaw Hall
- Gamul House
- Gawsworth New Hall
- Gawsworth Old Hall
- Gawsworth Old Rectory
- God's Providence House
- Great Moreton Hall
- Green Paddocks
- Greenbank
- Hallwood
- Halton Old Hall
- Hampton Old Hall
- Handforth Hall
- Hankelow Hall
- Hapsford Hall
- Hare Hill
- Hartford Manor
- Haslington Hall
- Hassall Hall
- Haughton Hall
- Hawthorn Hall
- Heawood Hall
- Hefferston Grange
- Henbury Hall
- Higher Hall
- Higher Huxley Hall
- Highfields
- Hinderton Hall
- Hockenhull Hall
- Holford Hall
- Hollin Old Hall
- The Homestead, Sandiway
- Hoole Hall
- Hough Hole House
- Hulme Hall
- Hurdsfield House
- Ince Hall (demolished)
- Ince Manor
- Ingersley Hall
- Inglewood
- Jodrell Hall
- Langley Hall
- Lawton Hall
- Lea Hall
- Leche House
- Legh Hall
- Legh Old Hall
- Limefield
- Little Moreton Hall
- Lower Carden Hall
- Lower Huxley Hall
- Lower Kinnerton Hall
- Lyme Park
- Lymm Hall
- Manley Knoll
- Manor House, Hale
- Marbury Hall, Anderton with Marbury
- Mere New Hall
- Mere Old Hall
- Middlewich Manor
- Mill House, Adlington
- Mobberley Old Hall
- Moore Hall
- Newton Hall, Mobberley
- Model Cottage, Sandiway
- Moss Hall, Audlem
- Mottram Hall
- Norcliffe Hall
- Norley Hall
- Normans Hall
- North Rode Manor
- Norton Priory
- Oakfield Manor
- Oakmere Hall
- Ollerton Hall
- Orford Hall
- Oughtrington Hall
- Oulton Hall
- Over Tabley Hall
- Overton Hall
- Peckforton Castle
- Peel Hall
- Peover Hall
- Poole Hall
- Portal, Tarporley
- Pownall Hall
- Puddington Hall
- Puddington Old Hall
- Radbroke Hall
- Ramsdell Hall
- Ravenscroft Hall
- Reaseheath Old Hall
- Rocksavage
- Rode Hall
- The Rookery, Tattenhall
- Rowton Hall
- Ruloe House
- Runcorn Town Hall
- Saighton Grange
- Saltersley Hall
- Shavington Hall
- Shotwick Hall
- Shotwick House
- Shrigley Hall
- Somerford Booths Hall
- Somerford Park, Cheshire
- Soss Moss Hall
- Stanley Palace
- Stanthorne Hall
- Stapeley House
- Stretton Hall
- Stretton Lower Hall
- Stretton Old Hall
- Sutton Hall, Little Sutton
- Sutton Hall, Sutton Lane Ends
- Sutton Hall, Sutton Weaver
- Swettenham Hall
- Swineyard Hall
- Tabley House
- Tattenhall Hall
- Tatton Hall
- Tatton Old Hall
- Tatton Park
- Tilstone Lodge
- Tirley Garth
- Toft Hall
- Trafford Hall
- Tushingham Hall
- Twemlow Hall
- Tytherington Old Hall
- Utkinton Hall
- Vale Royal Abbey
- Walmoor Hill
- Walton Hall
- Warford Hall
- Weaver Hall, Darnhall
- Whatcroft Hall
- Whirley Hall
- Willaston Hall
- Willaston Old Hall
- Willington Hall
- Willot Hall
- Winnington Hall

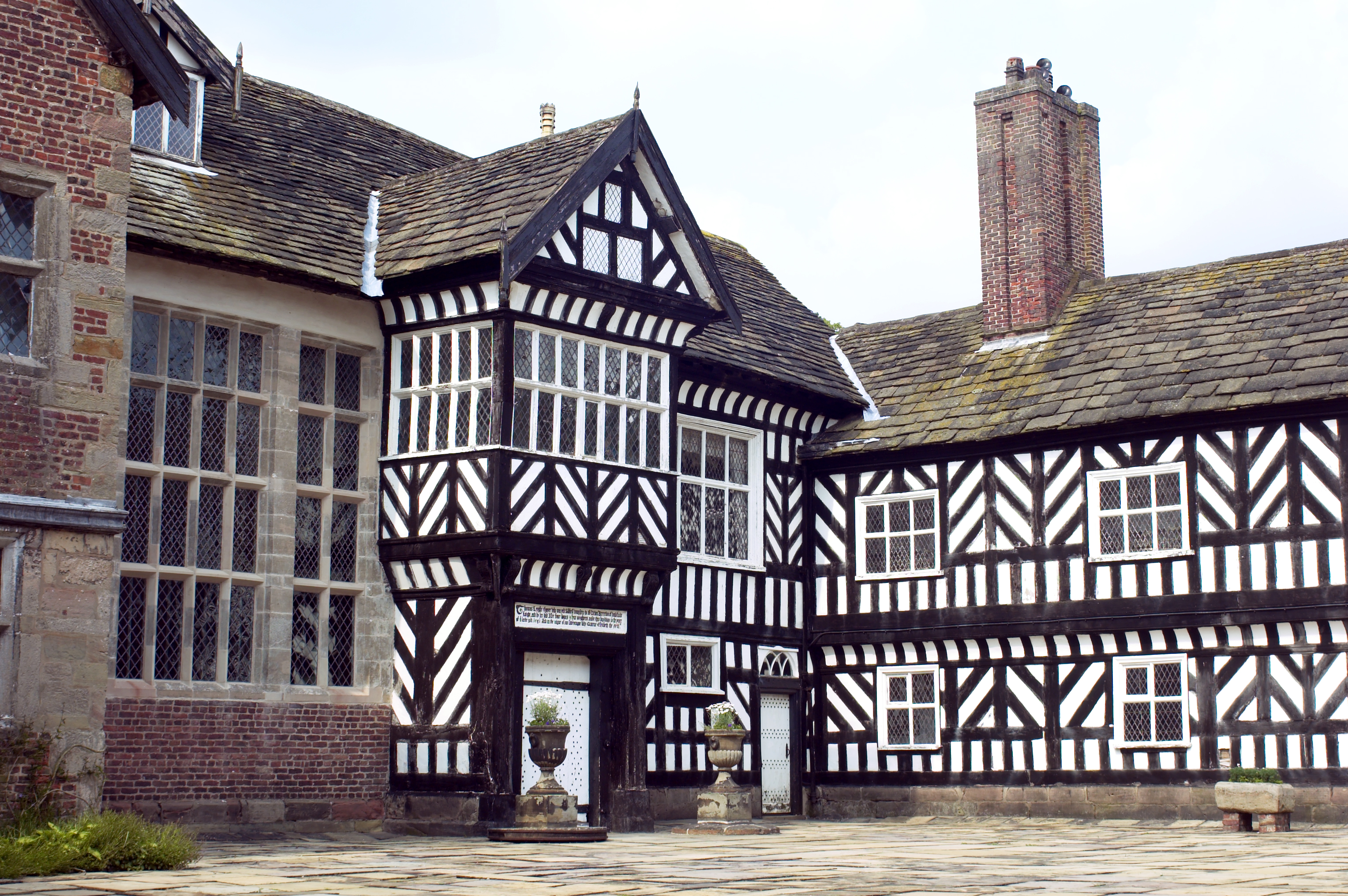
Adlington Hall

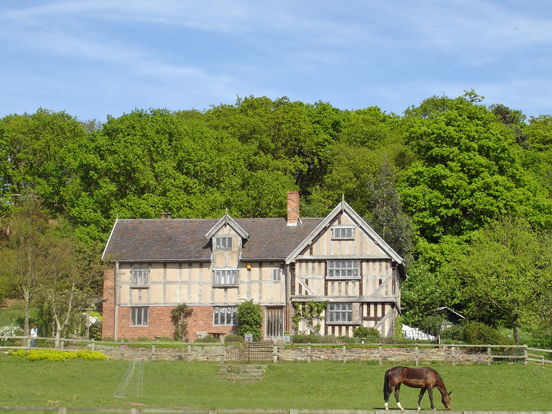
Austerson Old Hall

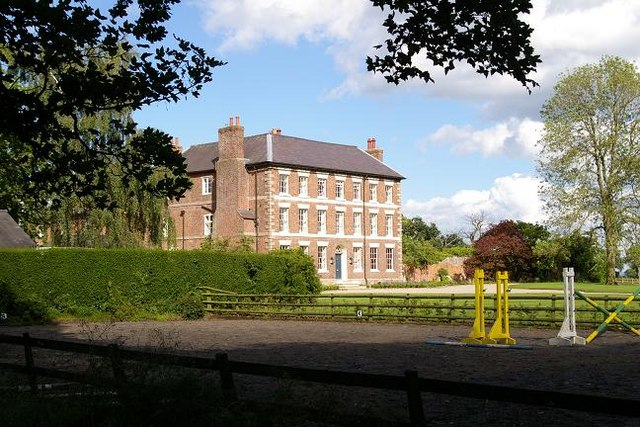
Bulkeley Hall

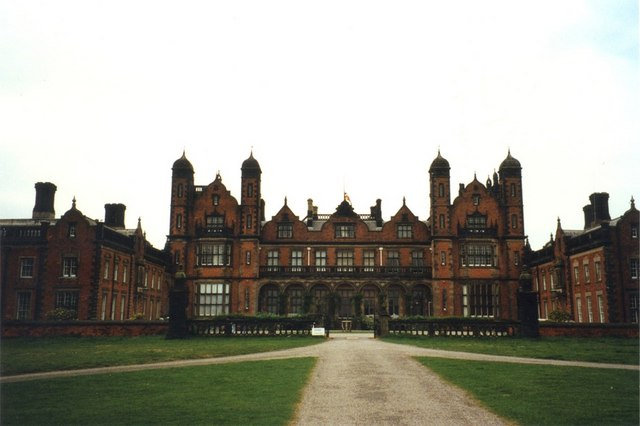
Capesthorne Hall

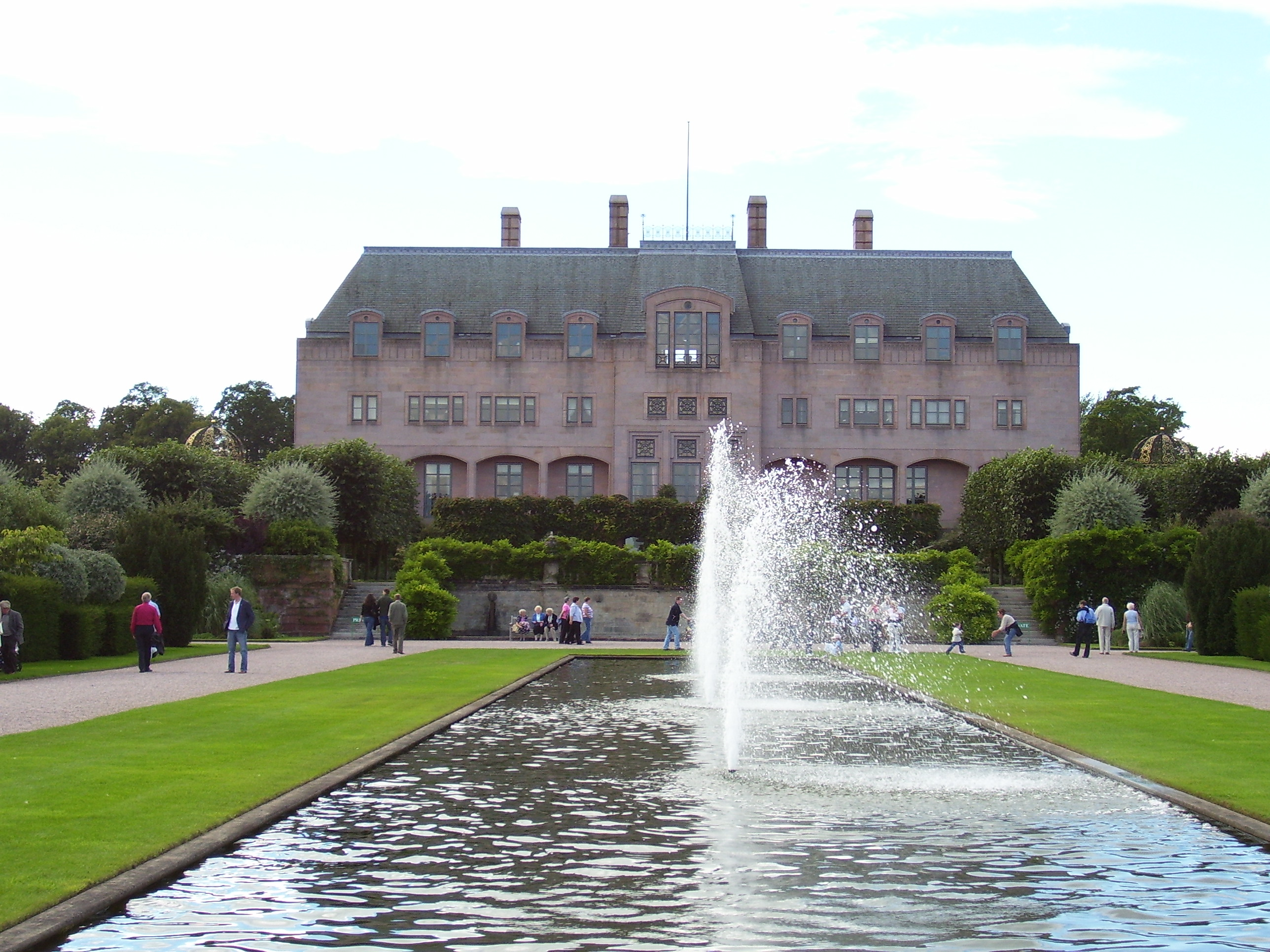
Eaton Hall

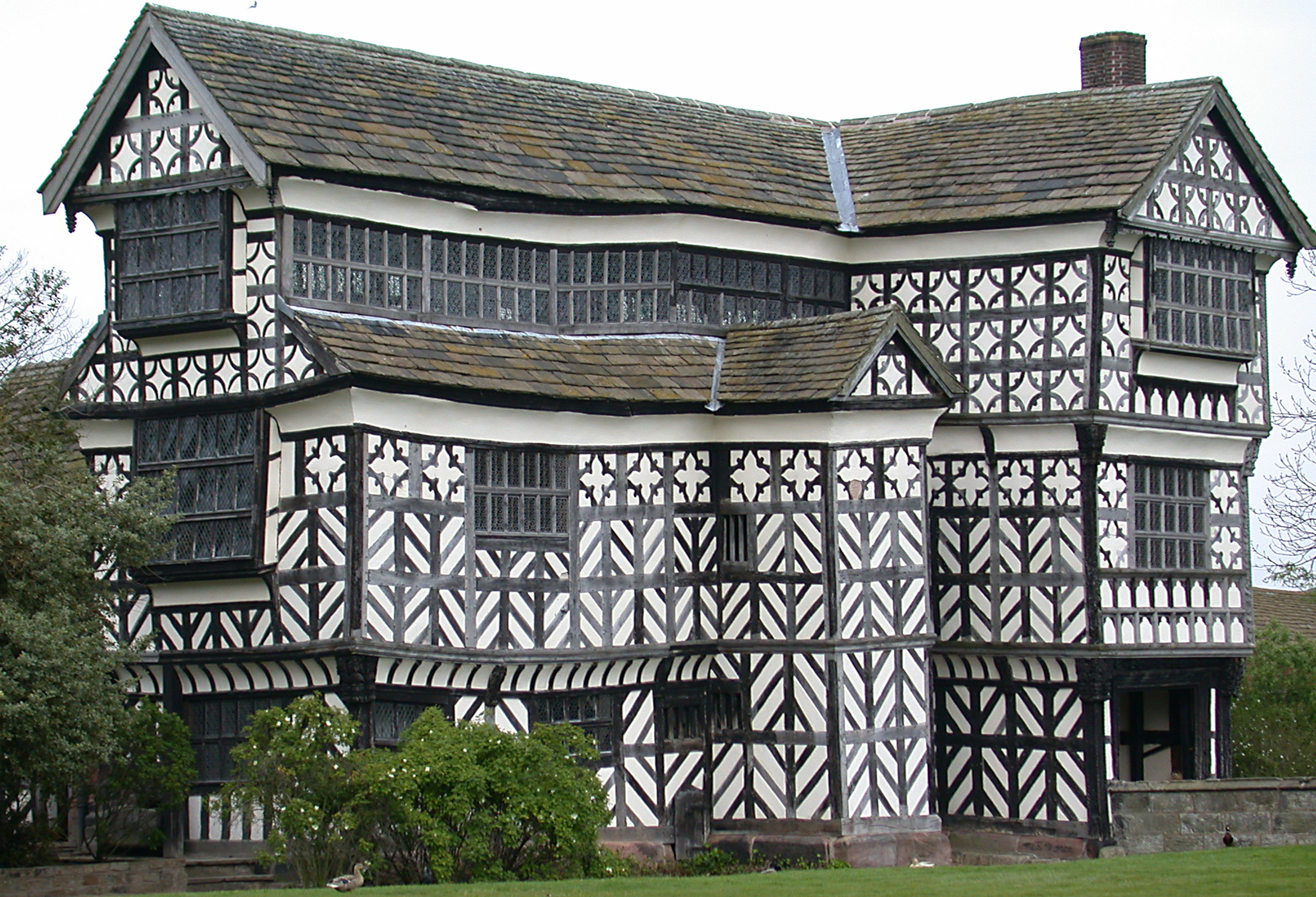
Little Moreton Hall

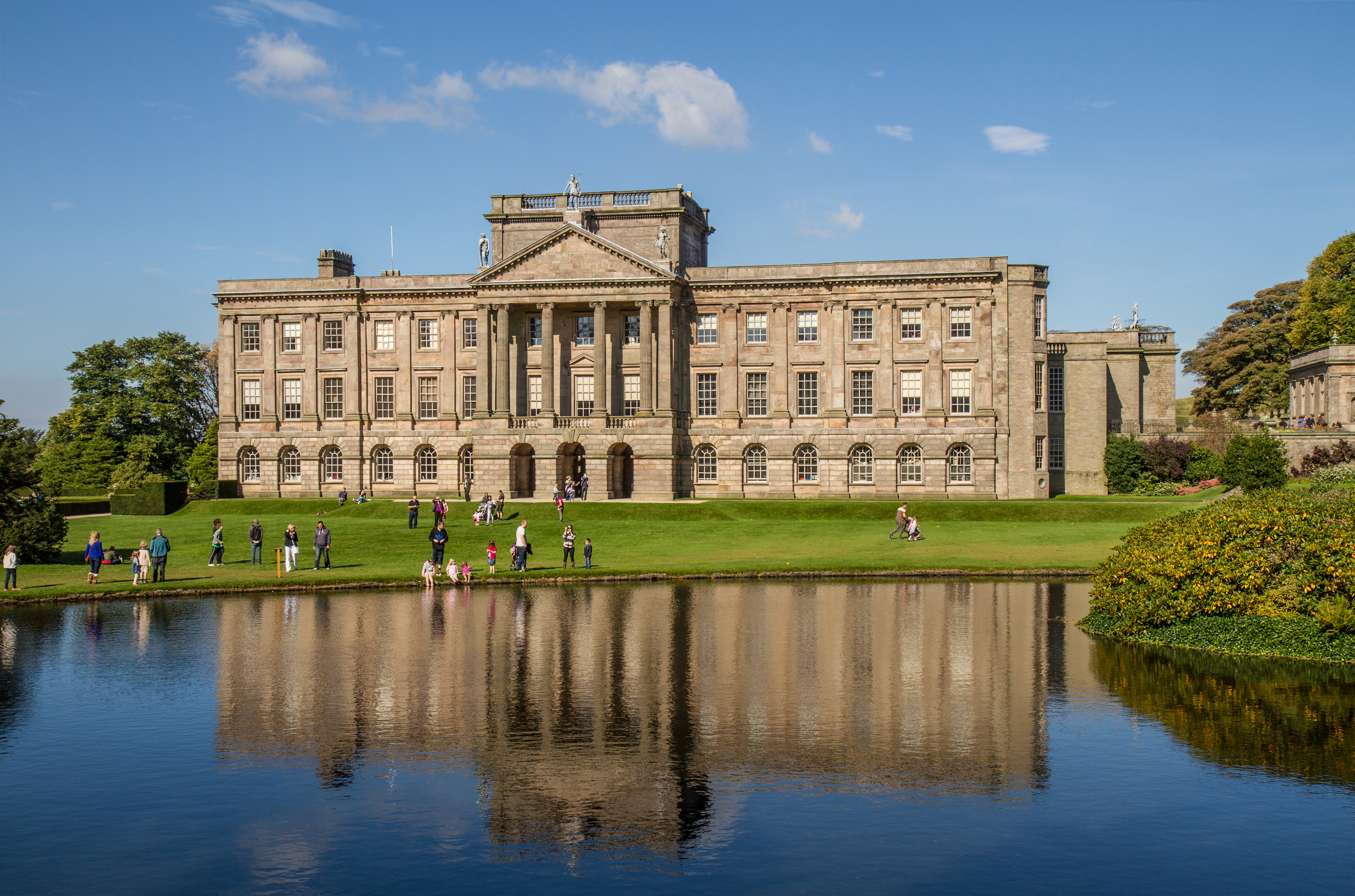
Lyme Park

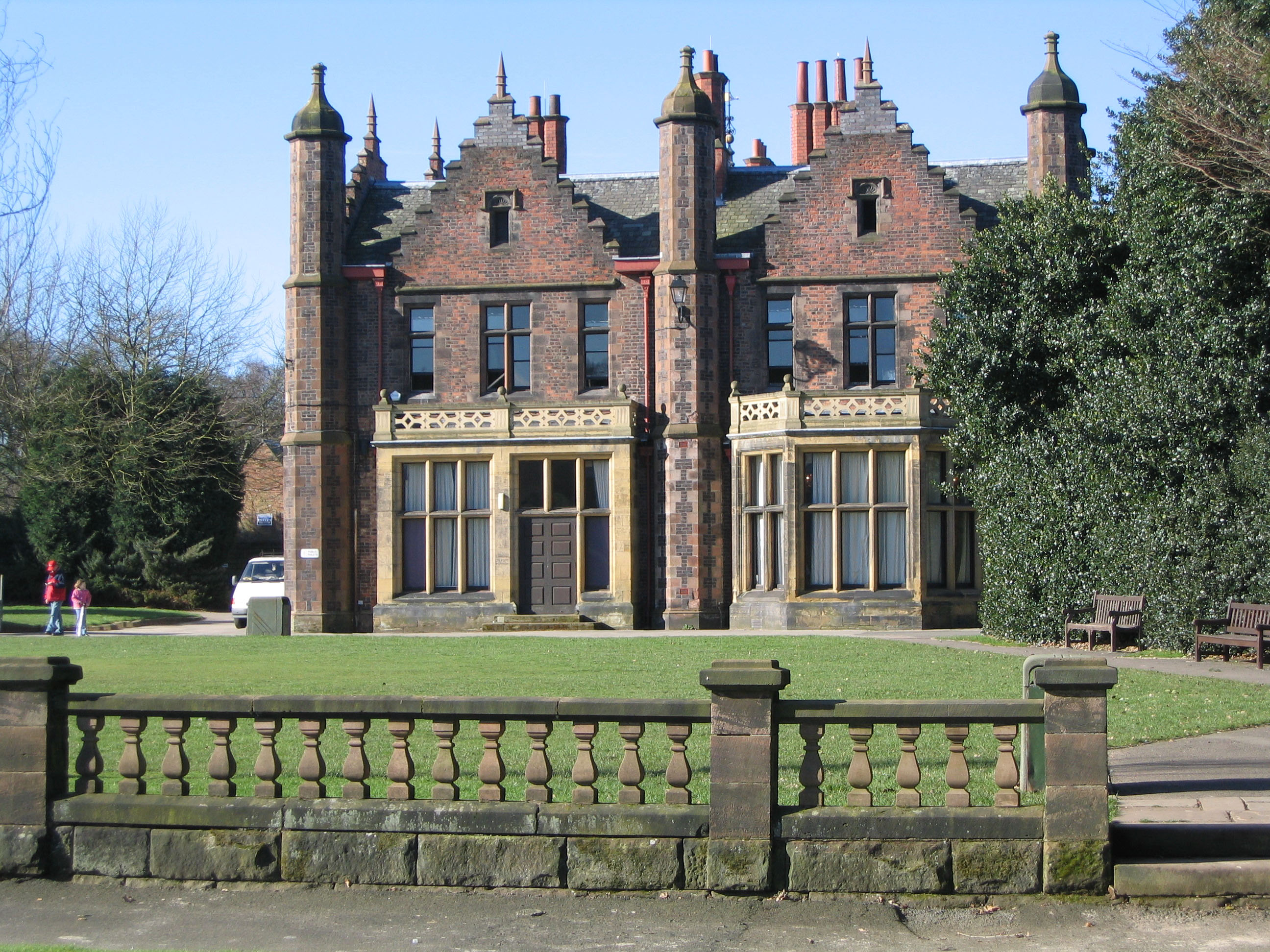
Walton Hall

=== Cornwall ===
- Antony House
- Boconnoc House
- Bonython Manor
- Boswednack Manor
- Caerhays Castle
- Carclew House
- Carnanton House
- Cotehele
- Duporth House
- Erisey
- Fir Hill Manor
- Glynn House
- Godolphin Estate
- Heligan estate
- Ince Castle
- Killigarth Manor
- Lanhydrock House
- Lanteglos Country House Hotel (formerly Lanteglos by Camelford rectory)
- Lawrence House
- Manor of Alverton
- Mount Edgcumbe House
- Pencarrow
- Pengersick Castle
- Penhallam
- Penpol, Lesnewth
- Penrose
- Pentillie Castle
- Peregrine Hall
- Place House
- Polraen Country House Hotel
- Port Eliot
- Prideaux Place
- Prospidnick Manor
- Rose-in-Vale Country House Hotel
- St Michael's Mount
- Tolverne
- Treen Manor
- Tregarden
- Tregenna Castle
- Tregothnan
- Treguddick Manor
- Trelissick House
- Trelowth Manor
- Trenhayle Manor
- Trereife House
- Trerice
- Tresillian House
- Tretheague Manor
- Trewarthenick Estate
- Trewithen House
- Tullimaar House
- Whiteford House
- Withielgoose House
- Wolsdon House
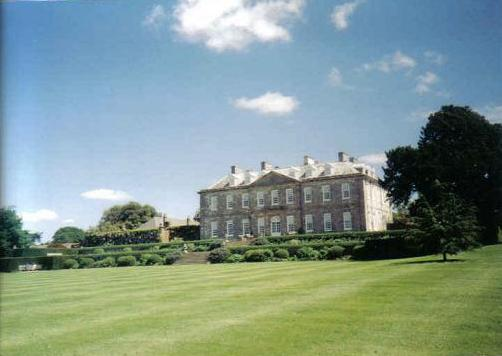
Antony House

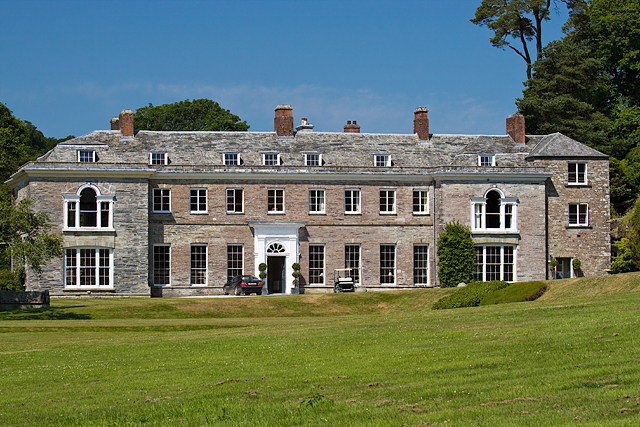
Boconnoc House

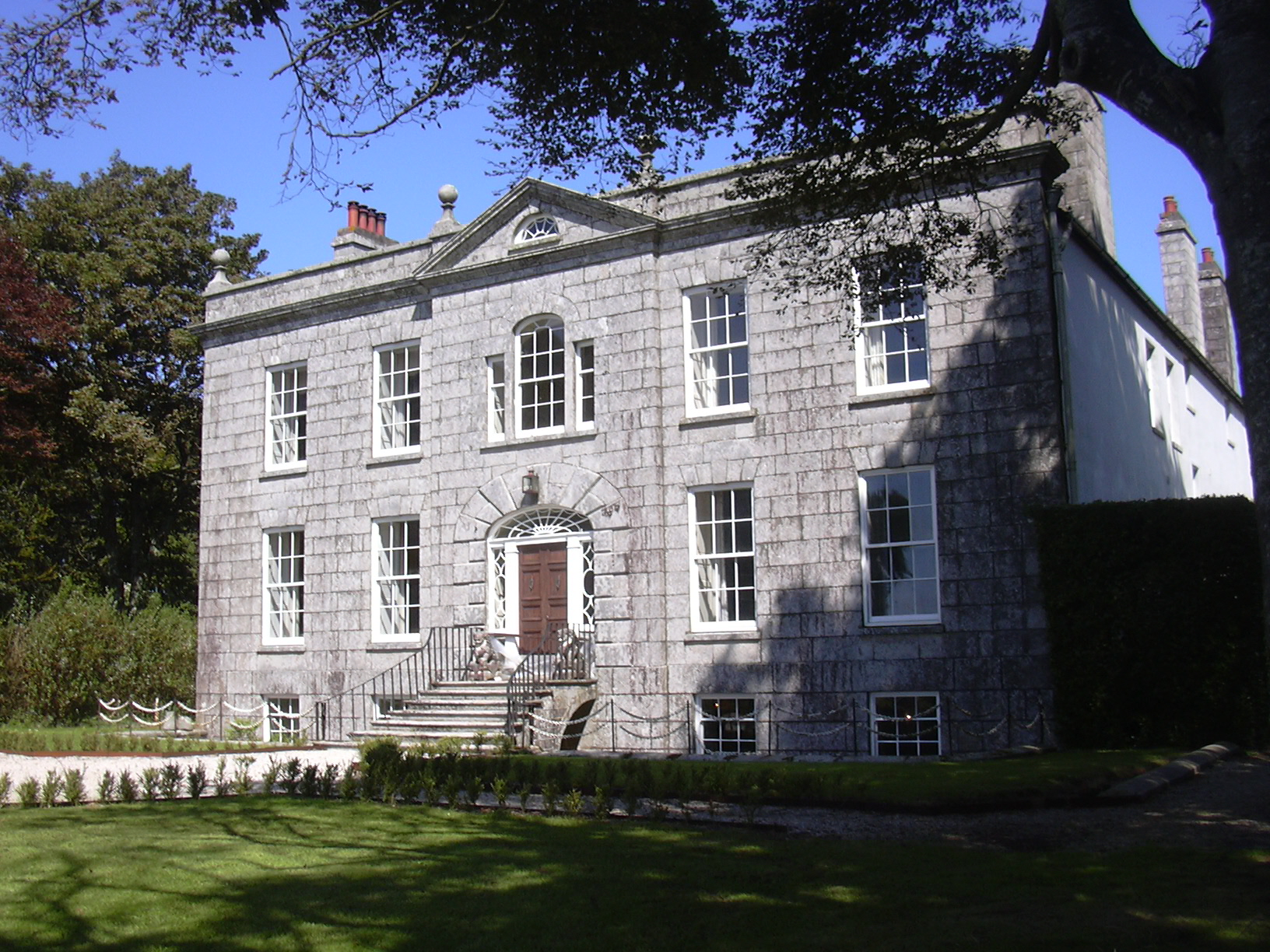
Bonython Manor

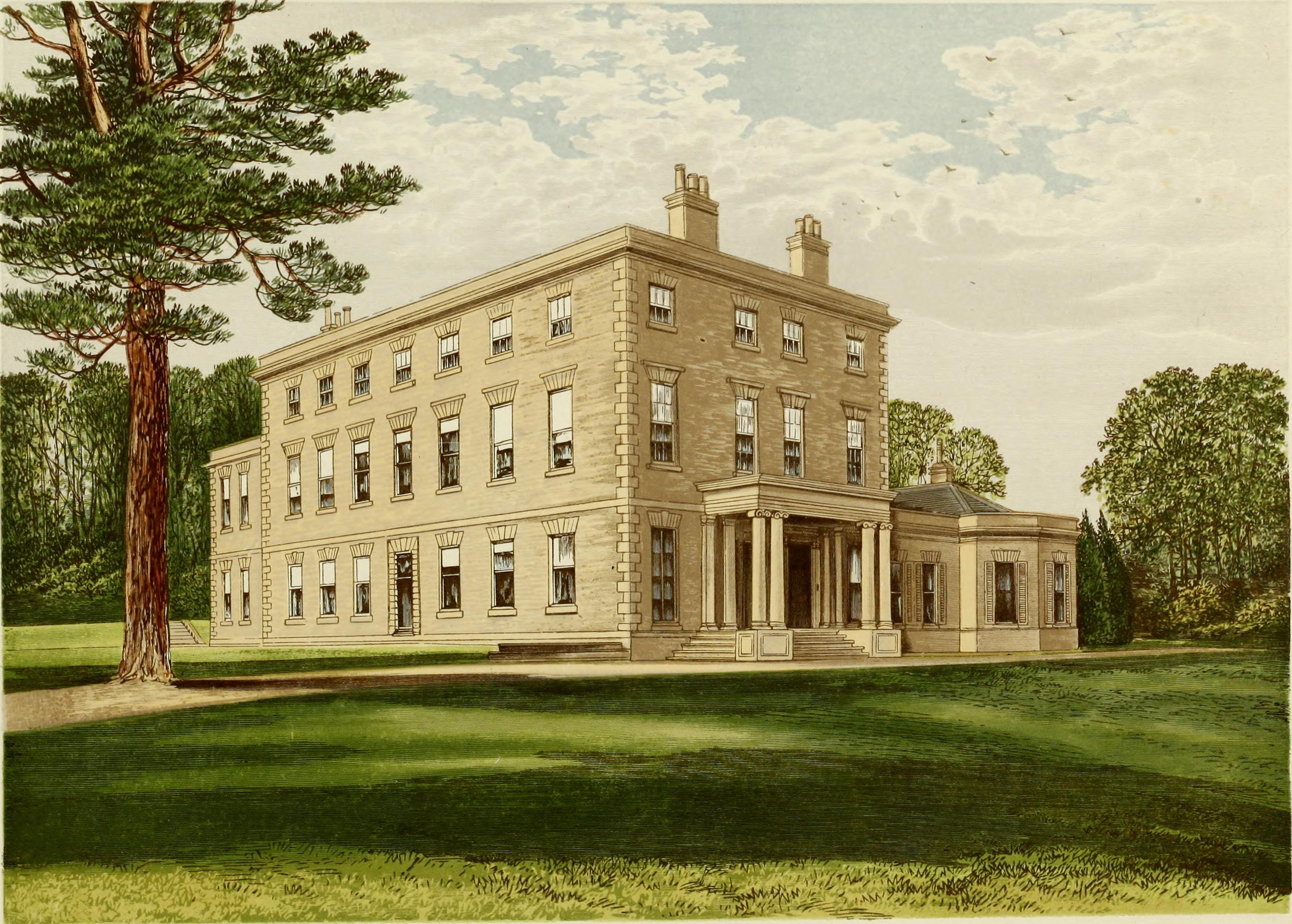
Carnanton House

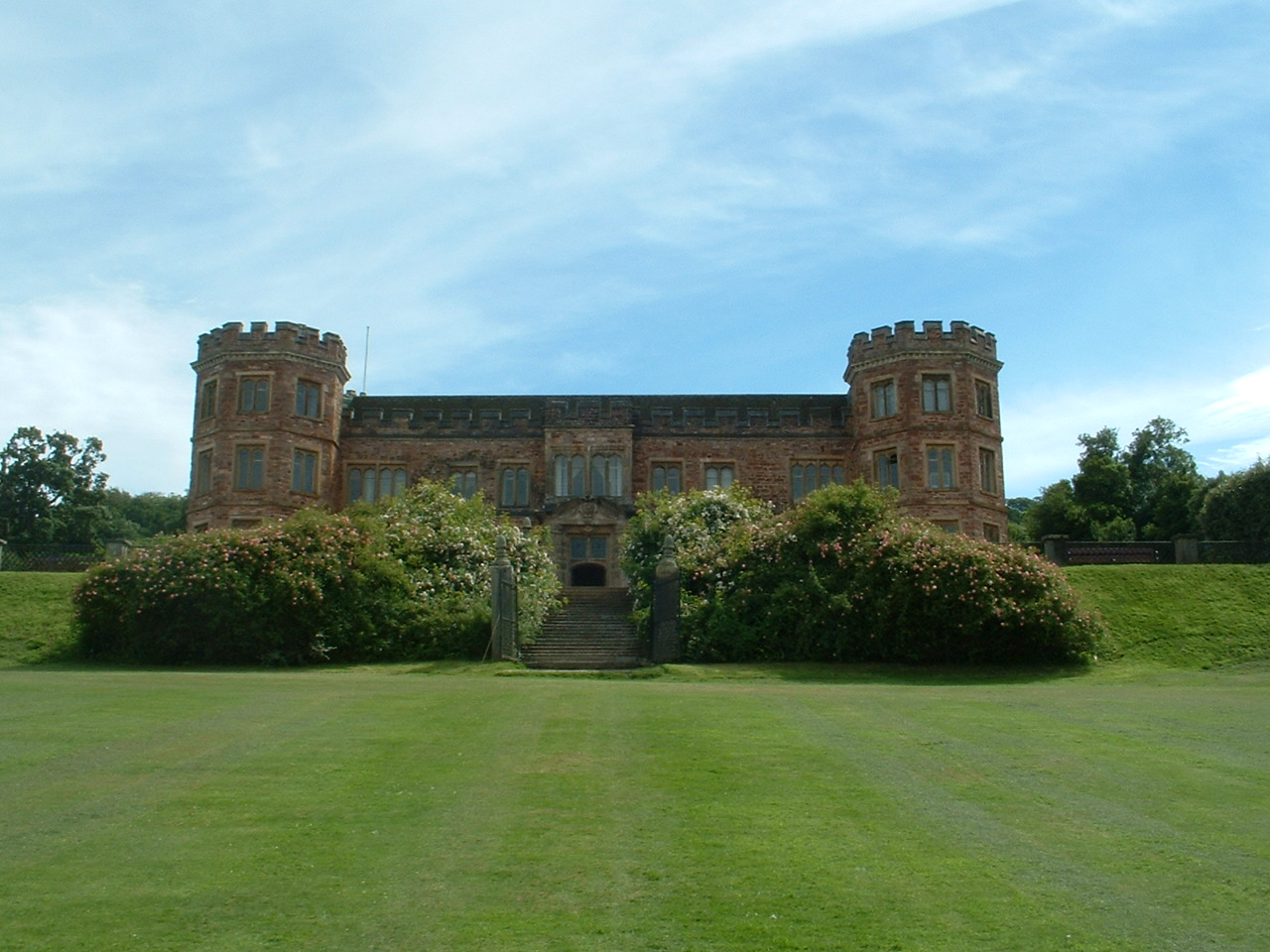
Mount Edgcumbe House

Port Eliot

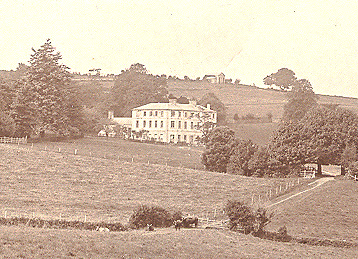
Whiteford House

=== Cumbria ===
- Abbey House, Barrow-in-Furness
- The Abbey, Skirwith
- Appleby Castle
- Armathwaite Hall
- Ashton House
- Askham Hall
- Aynsome Manor
- Barrow House
- Bassenfell Manor
- Blackwell
- Brantwood
- Brayton Hall
- Brougham Hall
- Cardew House
- Cardew Lodge
- Castle Head
- Cliburn Hall
- Clifton Hall
- Cockermouth Castle
- Conishead Priory
- Coniston Hall
- Corby Castle
- Cowmire Hall
- Dalemain
- Dallam Tower
- Dalton Hall
- Dalston Hall
- Dovenby Hall
- Eccle Riggs
- Eden Hall (demolished)
- Fawe Park
- Flass
- Graythwaite Hall
- Greystoke Castle
- Grizedale Hall (demolished)
- Hampsfield House
- Helsfell Hall
- High Head Castle
- Hill Top
- Holker Hall
- Hollin Hall
- Holmrook Hall
- Hutton in the Forest
- Hutton John
- Ingmire Hall
- Isel Hall
- Kirklinton Hall
- Langdale Chase
- Langrigg Hall
- Levens Hall
- Lingholm
- Lowbridge House
- Lowther Castle
- Mirehouse
- Moresby Hall
- Mumps Hall
- Muncaster Castle
- Naworth Castle
- Netherby Hall
- Overwater Hall
- Rampside Hall
- Rose Castle
- Rothay Manor
- Rusland Hall
- Rydal Hall
- Salkeld Hall
- Scaleby Castle
- Sedgwick House
- Sizergh Castle and Garden
- Swarthmoor Hall
- Townend
- Tullie House Museum and Art Gallery
- Underley Hall
- Underscar Manor
- Wharton Hall
- Witherslack Hall
- Wray Castle
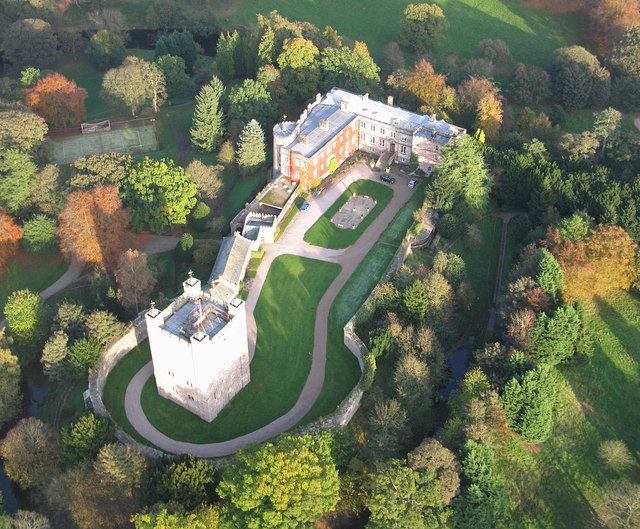
Appleby Castle

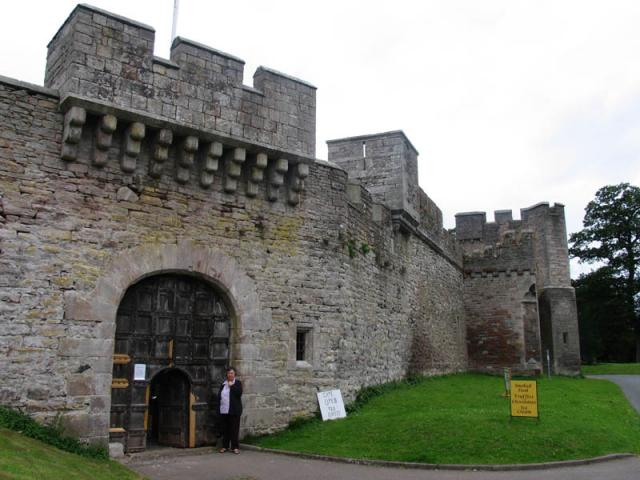
Brougham Hall

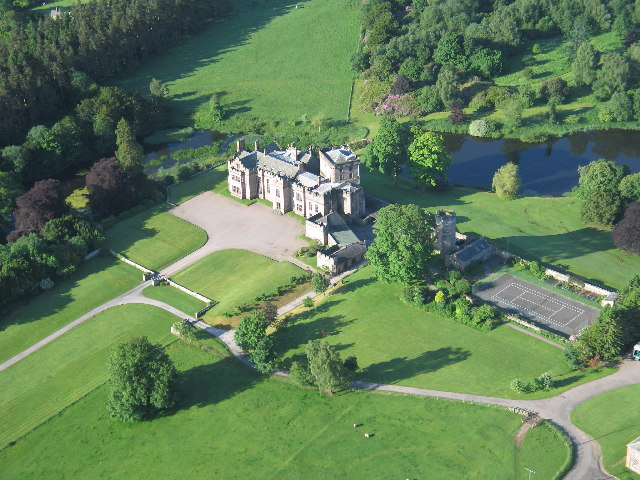
Greystoke Castle

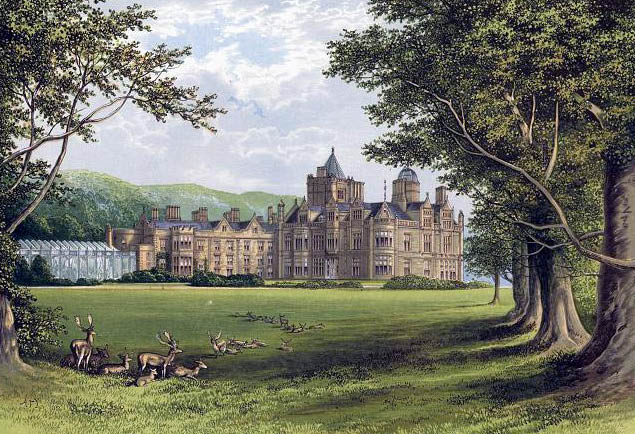
Holker Hall

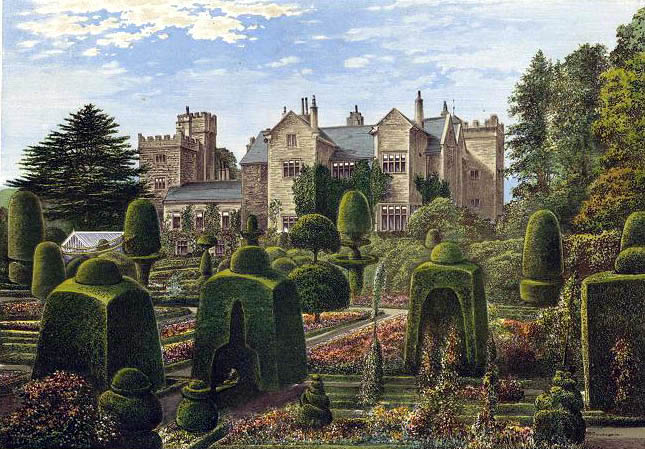
Levens Hall

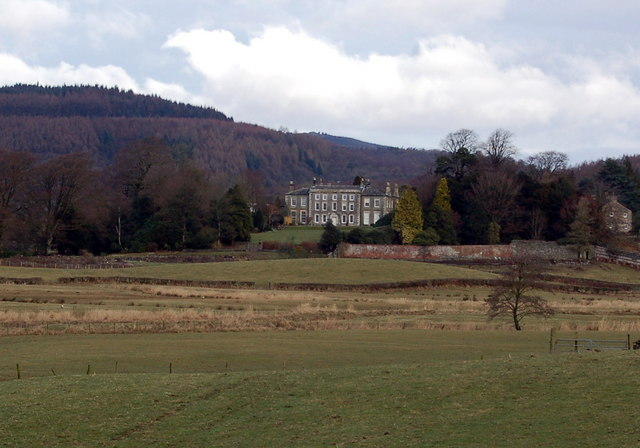
Rusland Hall

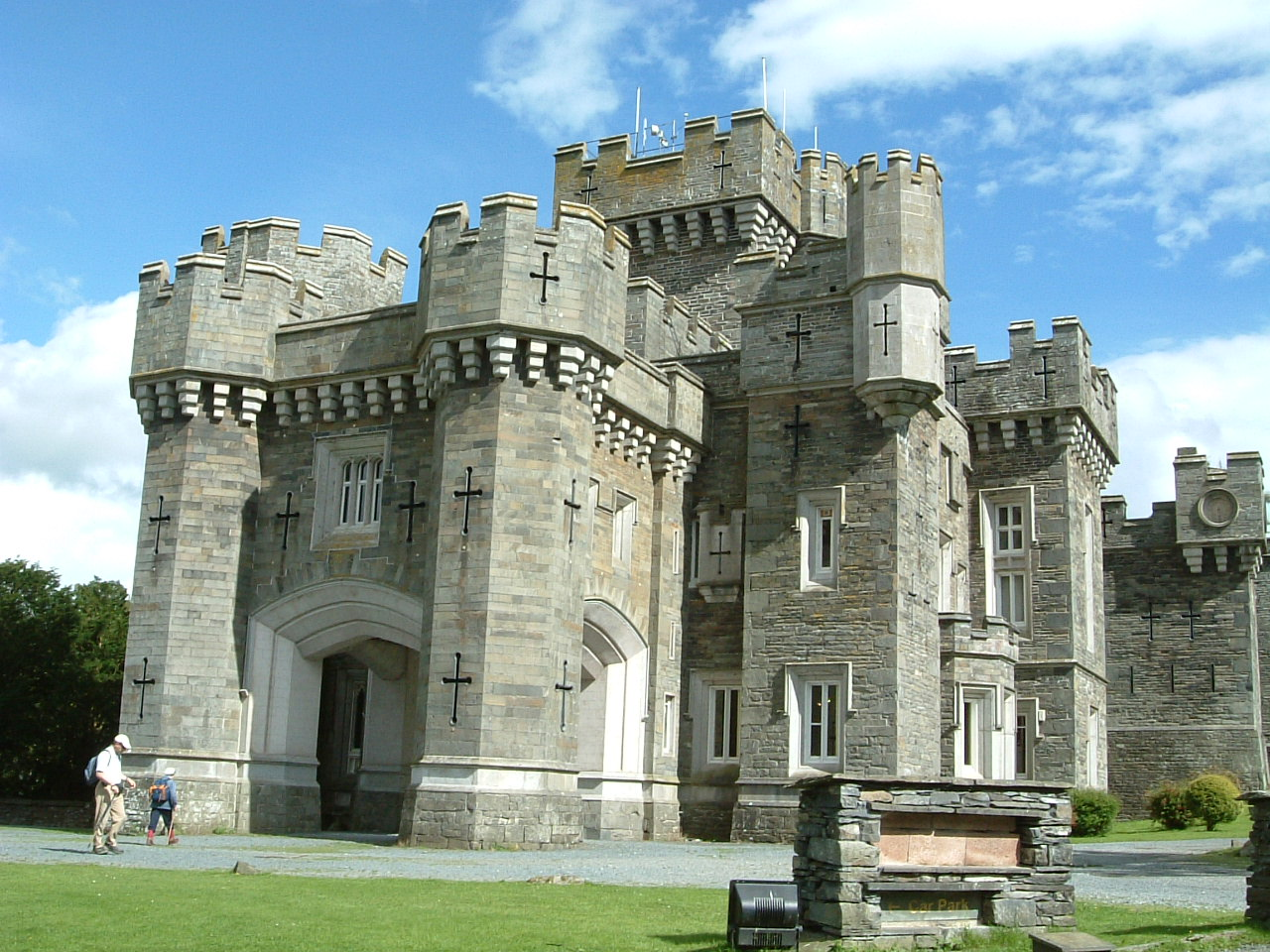
Wray Castle

=== Derbyshire ===
- Alfreton Hall
- Alsop Hall
- Ashbourne Hall
- Ashford in the Water Hall
- Aston Hall, Aston-on-Trent
- Bank Hall, Chapel-en-le-Frith
- Barlborough Hall
- Barlow Woodseats Hall
- Bolsover Castle
- Bradbourne Hall
- Bradley Hall
- Breadsall Priory
- Bretby Hall
- Brocksford Hall
- Burton Closes
- Buxton Hall
- Calke Abbey
- Carnfield Hall
- Catton Hall
- Chatsworth House
- Coxbench Hall
- Derwent House, Matlock
- Dethick Manor
- Ednaston Manor
- Elvaston Castle
- Errwood Hall
- Eyam Hall
- Fenny Bentley Old Hall
- Flagg Hall
- Foremarke Hall
- Great Longstone Hall
- Haddon Hall
- Ham Hall (demolished)
- Hardwick Hall
- Hartington Hall
- Hassop Hall
- Hayes Conference Centre
- Holme Hall, Bakewell
- Hopton Hall
- Ingleby Toft
- Kedleston Hall
- Locko Park
- Longford Hall
- Melbourne Hall
- Mercaston Hall
- Meynell Hall
- Middleton Hall, Stoney Middleton
- Morley Manor
- Ogston Hall
- Parwich Hall
- Radbourne Hall
- Renishaw Hall
- Riber Castle
- Risley Hall
- Shipley Hall
- Snitterton Hall
- Somersal Herbert Hall
- Somersall Hall
- Stancliffe Hall
- Stanton Hall, Stanton in Peak
- Stubbing Court
- Stydd Hall
- Sudbury Hall
- Sutton Scarsdale Hall
- Tapton House
- Thornbridge Hall
- Tissington Hall
- Walton Hall, Chesterfield
- Walton Hall, Walton-on-Trent
- Whitwell Old Hall
- Wirksworth Hall (demolished)
- Willersley Castle
- Wingfield Manor
- Ye Olde Cinder House
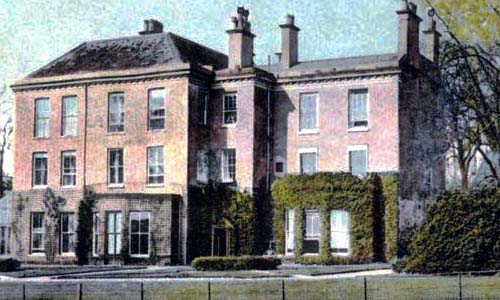
Ashbourne Hall

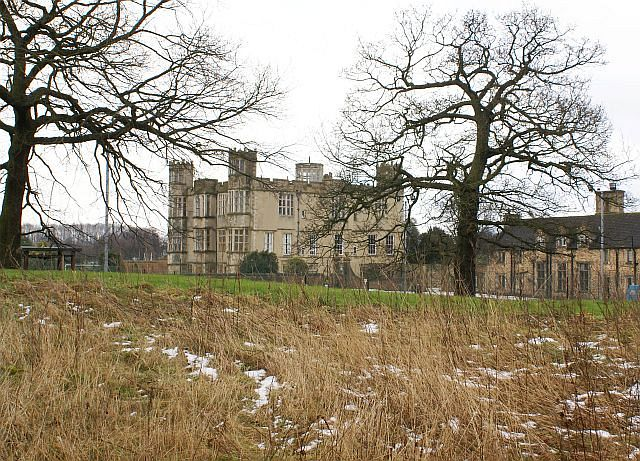
Barlborough Hall

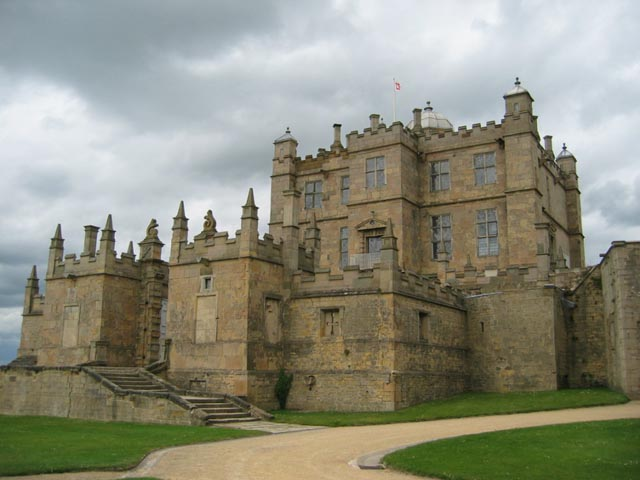
Bolsover Castle

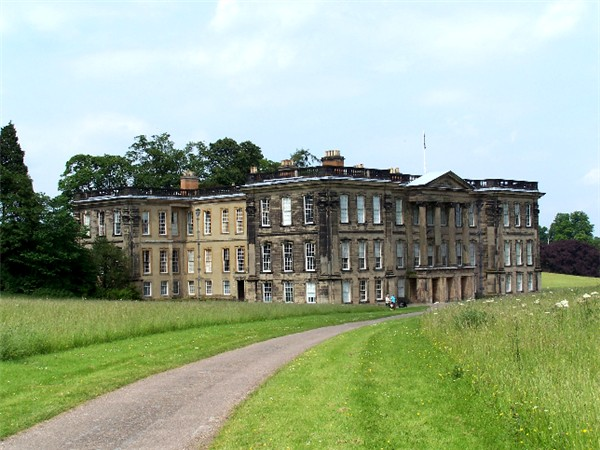
Calke Abbey

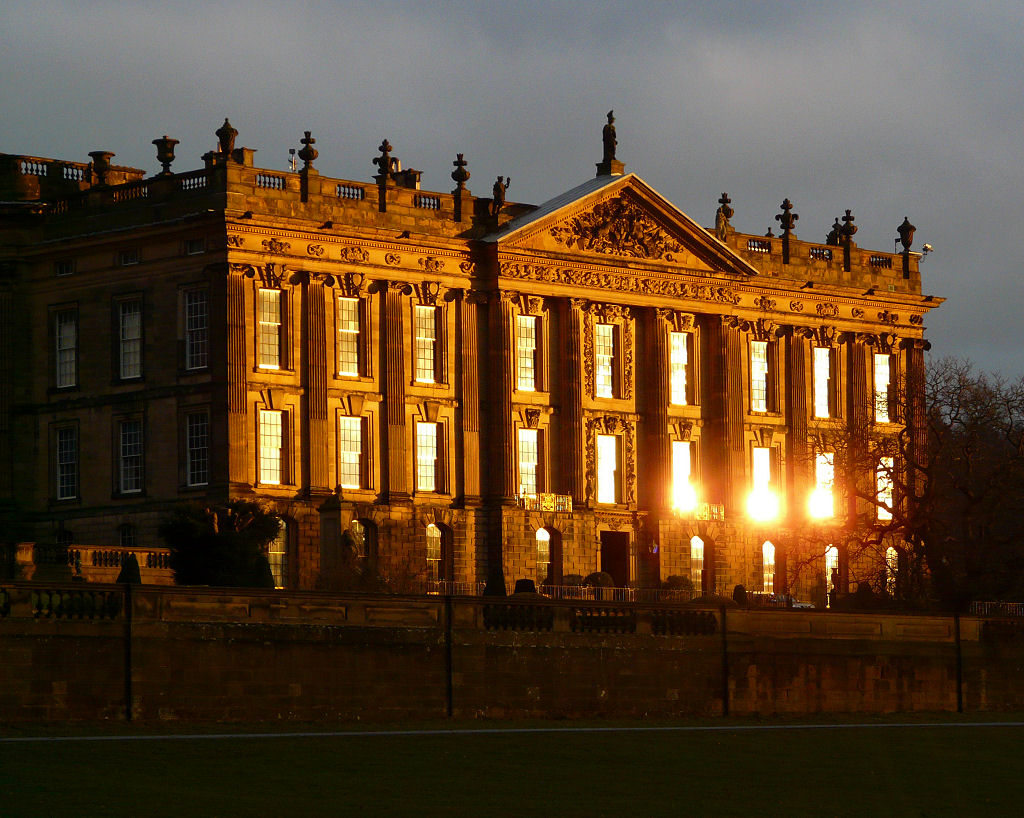
Chatsworth House

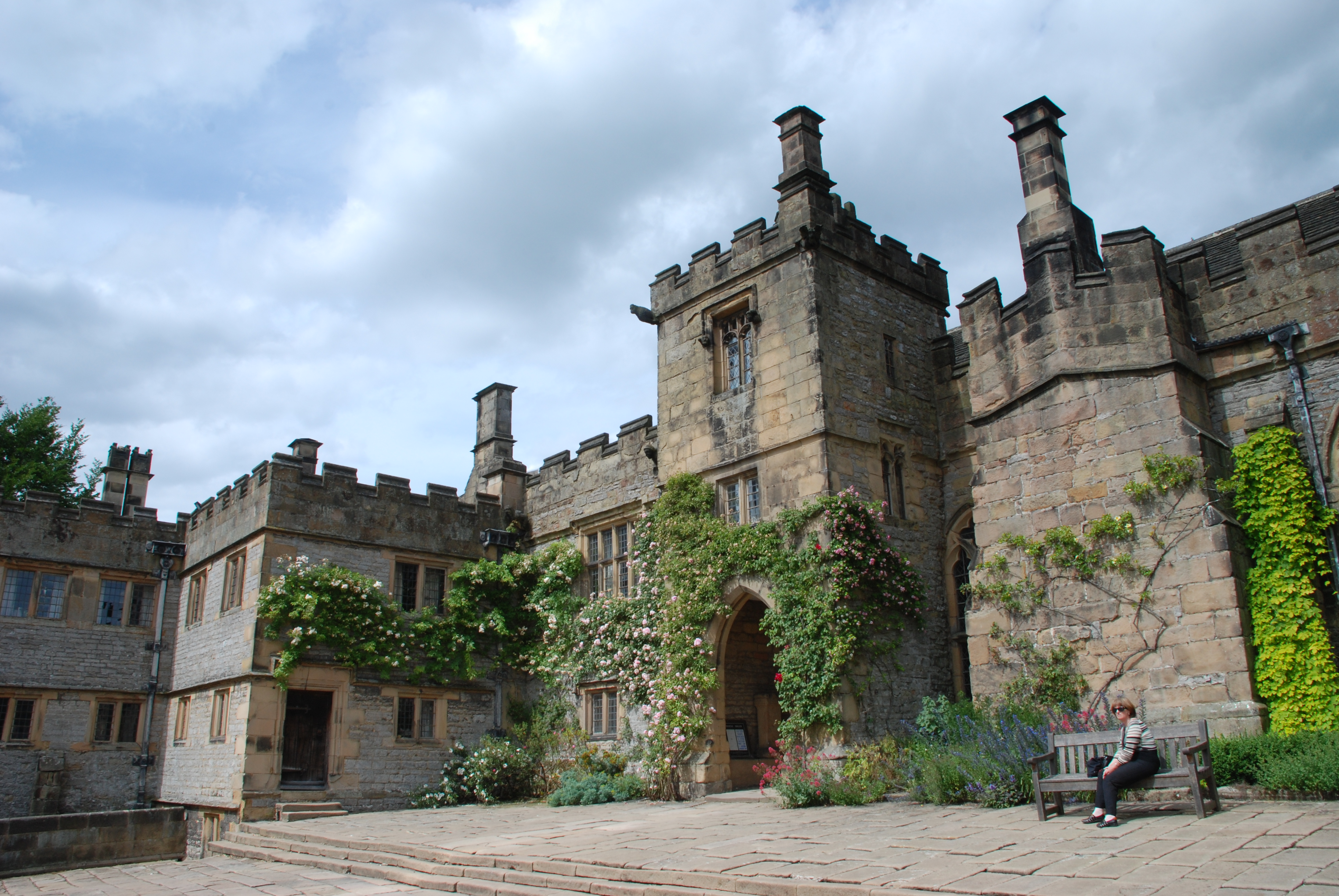
Haddon Hall

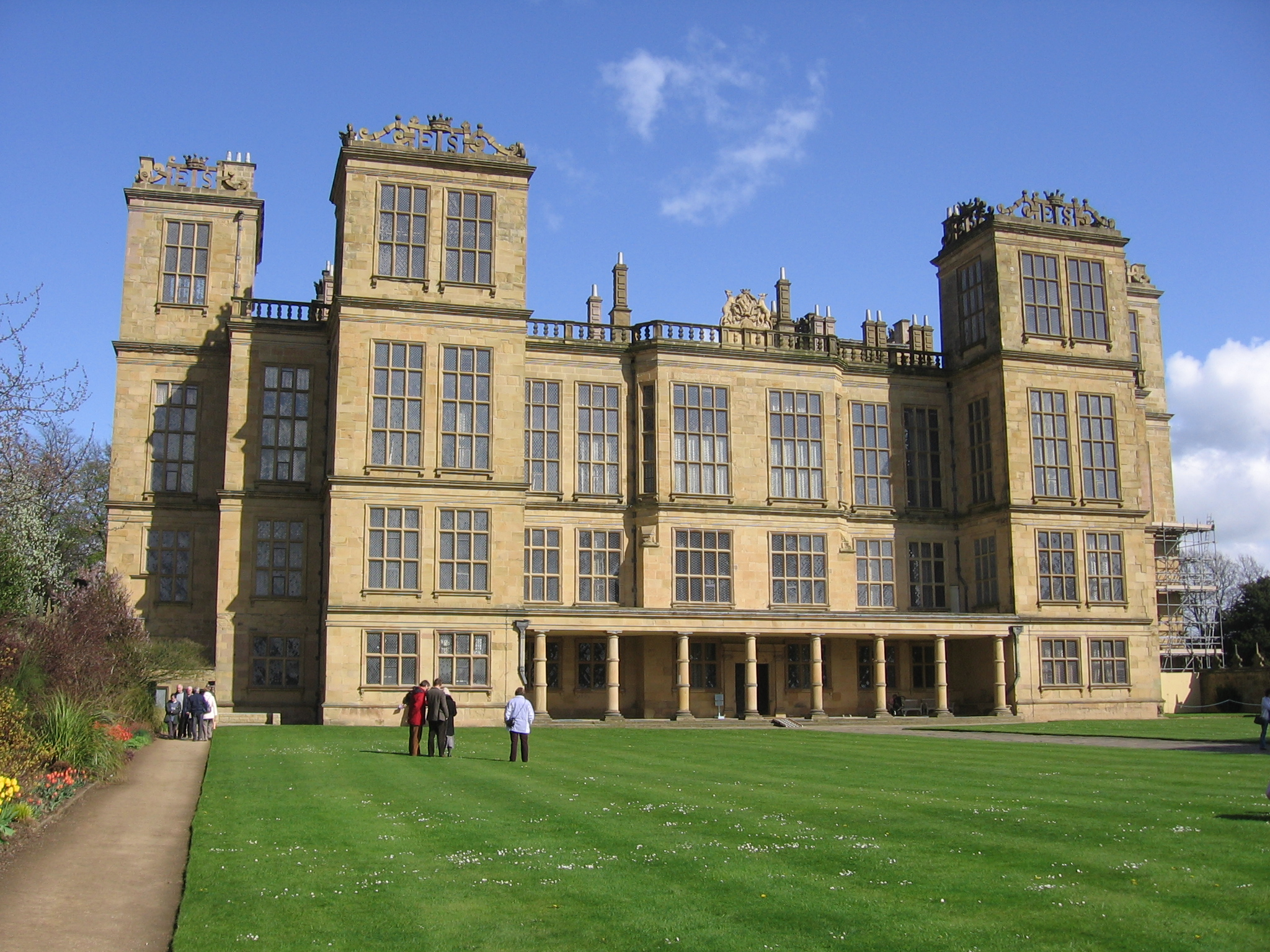
Hardwick Hall

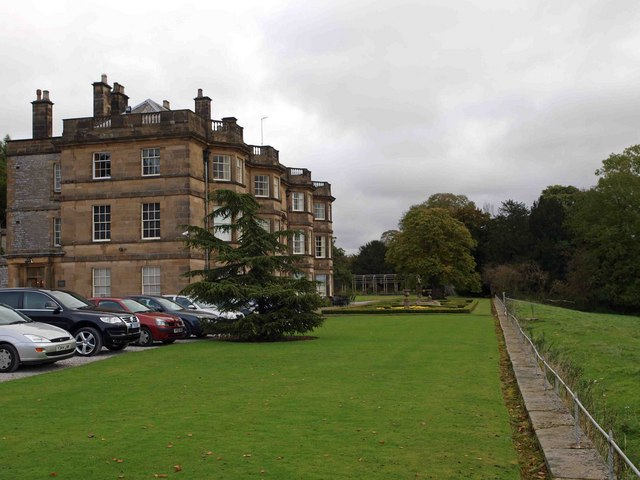
Hassop Hall

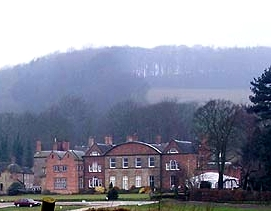
Hopton Hall

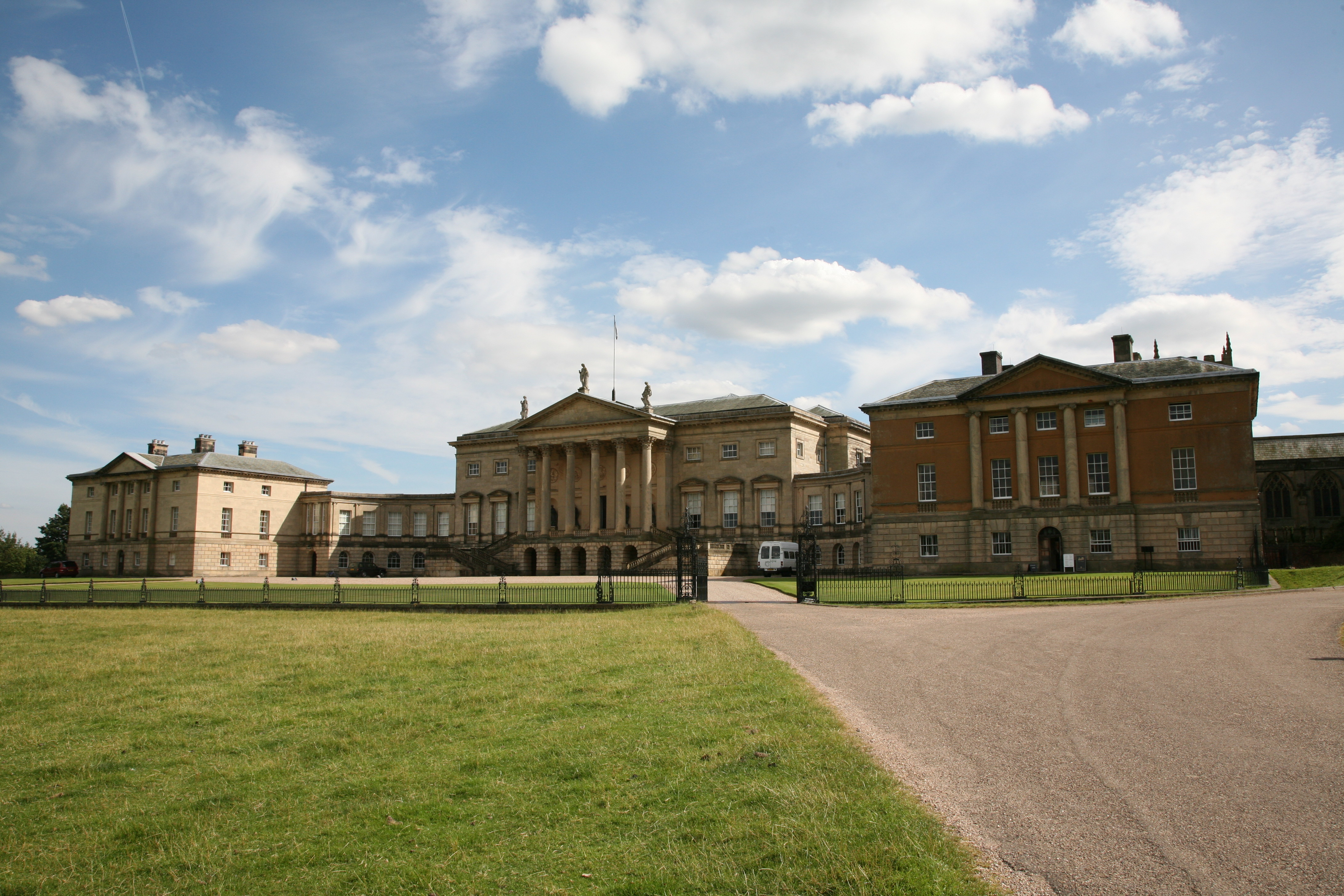
Kedleston Hall

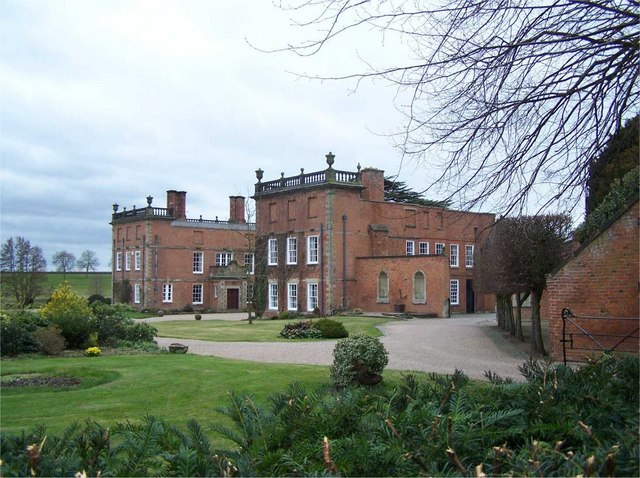
Longford Hall

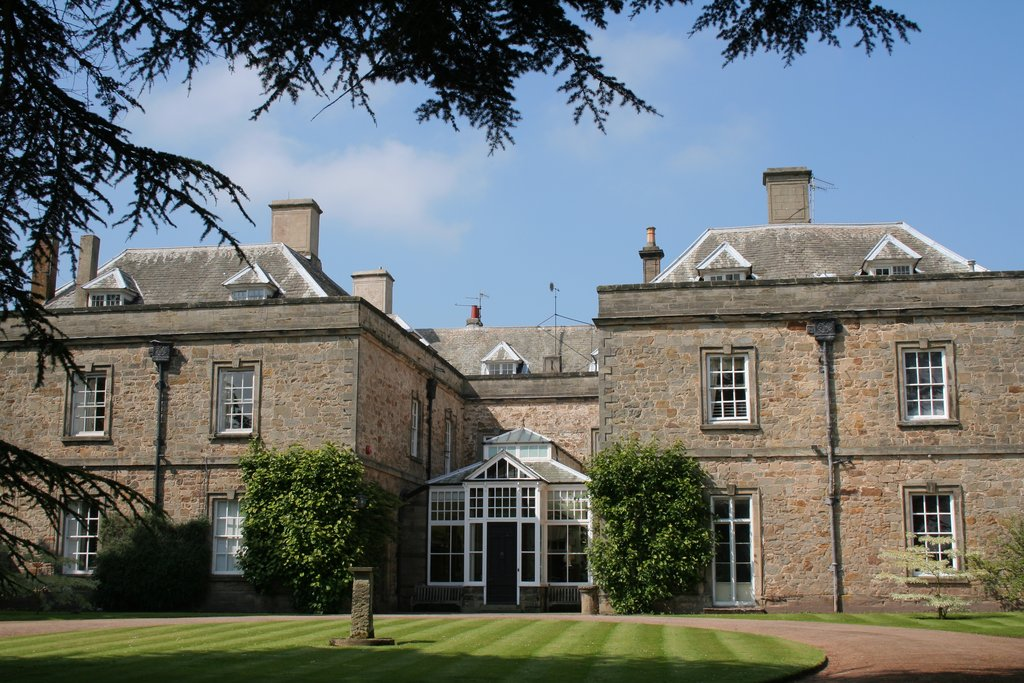
Melbourne Hall

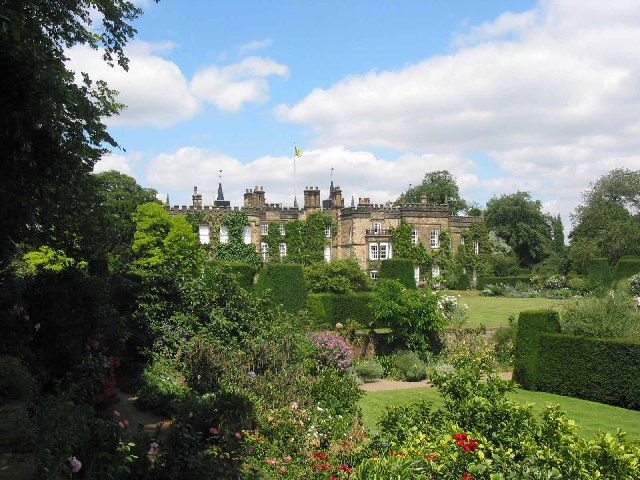
Renishaw Hall

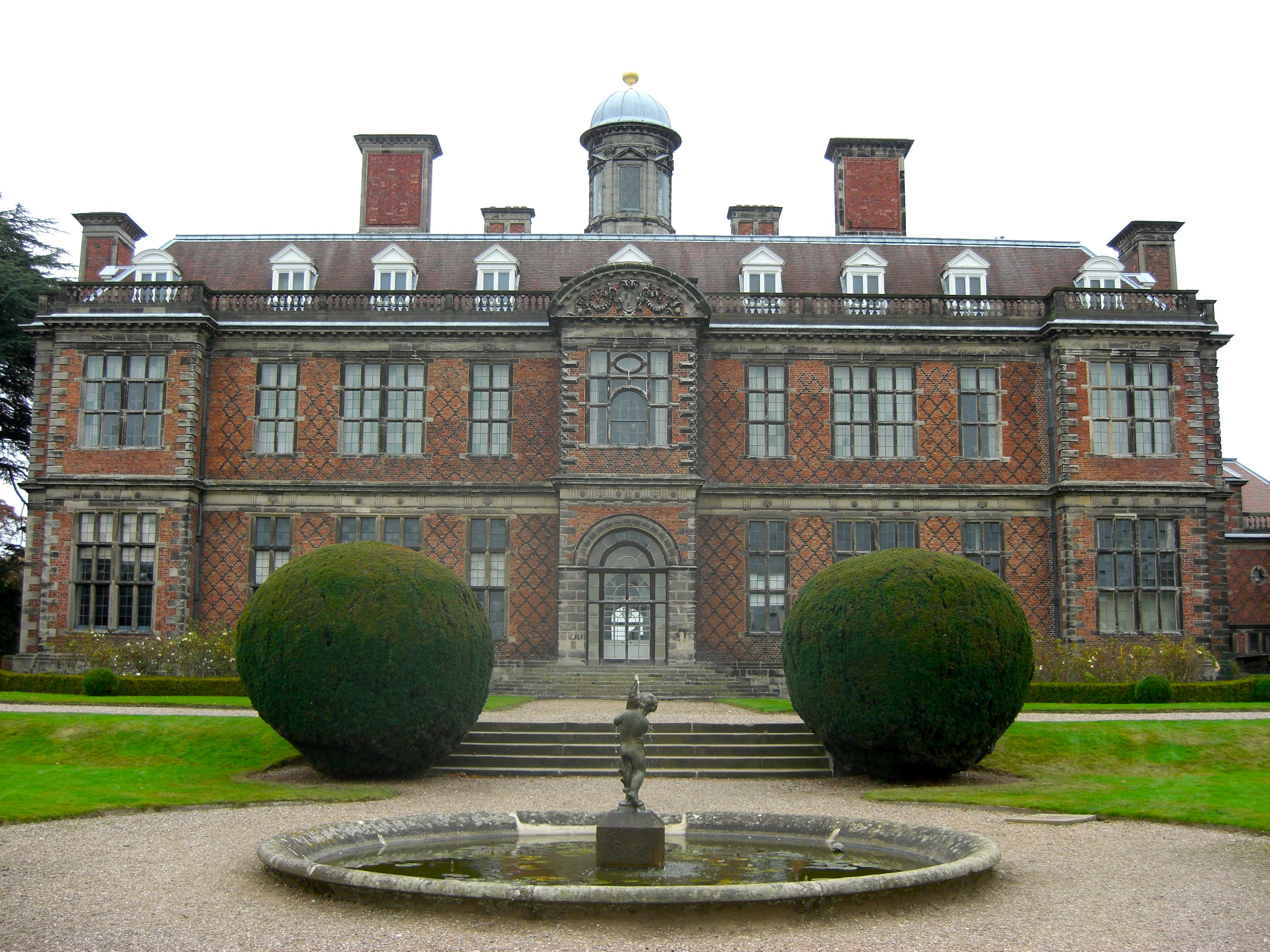
Sudbury Hall

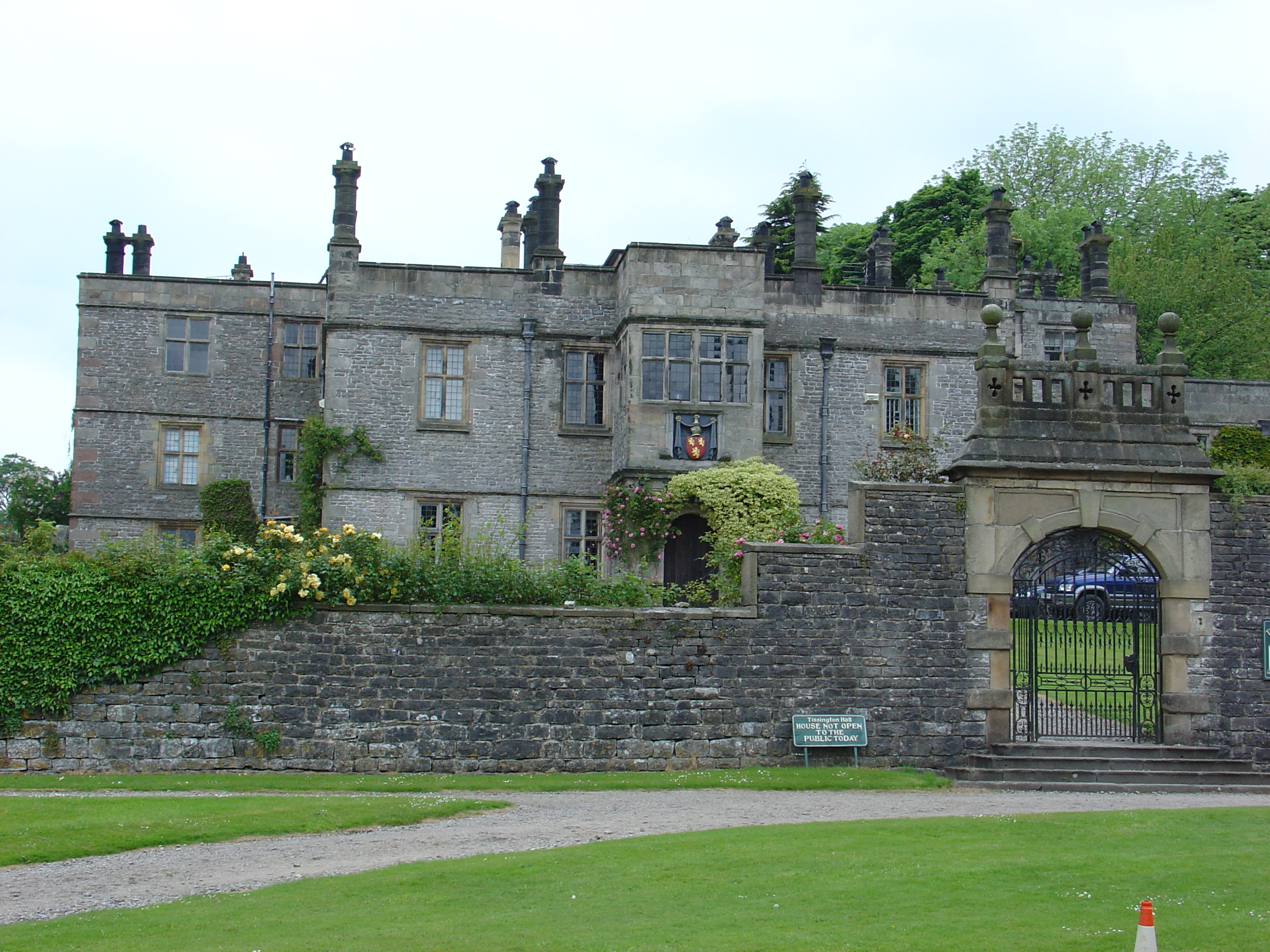
Tissington Hall

=== Devon ===
- Affeton Castle
- A La Ronde
- Arlington Court
- Bark House
- Berry Pomeroy Castle
- Bickleigh Castle
- Bicton House
- Blackhall Manor
- Bowden House
- Bradfield Hall
- Bradley
- Brunel Manor
- Buckland Abbey
- Buckland House
- Butterford House
- Cadhay
- Castle Drogo
- Castle Hill
- Chambercombe Manor
- Coleton Fishacre
- Compton Castle
- Coryton Park
- Court Green
- Creedy, Sandford
- Dartington Hall
- Dartmoor longhouse
- Downes
- The Elizabethan House
- Escot House
- Fallapit House
- Flete House
- Fowlescombe Hall and Manor
- Goodamoor House
- Great Bidlake
- Great Fulford
- Greenway Estate
- Hemerdon House
- Hillersdon House
- Huntsham Court
- Kelly House
- Kennaway House
- Killerton
- Kirkham House
- Kitley House
- Knightshayes Court
- Langdon Court
- Loughwood Meeting House
- Lupton House
- Luscombe Castle
- Lynwood House
- Maristow House
- Moreton House
- Nutwell
- Oldway Mansion
- Orleigh Court
- Overbeck's
- Peamore House
- Poltimore House
- Portledge Manor
- Powderham Castle
- The Prysten House, Plymouth
- Pynes House
- Saltram House
- Sand
- Sandridge Park
- Sharpham
- Shiphay Manor
- Shute Barton
- New Shute House
- Sidbury Manor
- Stowford House
- Sydenham House, Devon
- Tapeley Park
- The Three Crowns Hotel
- Tiverton Castle
- Tor Royal
- Torre Abbey
- Totnes Guildhall
- Ugbrooke
- West Challacombe Manor
- Whiteway House
- Wiscombe Park
- Woodway House

=== Dorset ===
- Athelhampton
- Brownsea Castle
- Came House
- Charborough House
- Clouds Hill
- Cranborne Manor
- Crichel House
- Eastbury Park
- Edmondsham House
- Fiddleford Manor
- Forde Abbey
- Gloucester House
- Highcliffe Castle
- Kingston Lacy
- Kingston Maurward House
- Kingston Russell
- Langtry Manor
- Leeson House
- Lulworth Castle
- Mappowder Court
- Max Gate
- Merly House
- Melbury House
- Milton Abbey School
- Parnham House
- Pennsylvania Castle
- Purse Caundle Manor
- Sherborne Castle
- Sherborne House
- Smedmore House
- St Giles House, Wimborne St Giles
- Stalbridge
- Stepleton House
- Stock Gaylard House
- Thomas Hardy's Cottage
- Wolfeton House
- Woolbridge Manor House

=== County Durham ===
- Auckland Castle
- Beamish Hall
- Bellasis (demolished)
- Billingham Hall (demolished)
- Binchester Hall (demolished 1835)
- Bishop's Manor House (demolished)
- Blackwell Grange Hotel
- Blackwell Hall, Darlington (demolished 1965)
- Blackwell Hill (demolished 1972)
- Blakiston Hall (demolished)
- Bradley Hall, Wolsingham (ruined)
- Brancepeth Castle
- Branksome Hall (demolished 1978)
- Broadwood Hall (demolished 1960)
- Coatham Stob
- Cocken Hall (demolished)
- Cockerton Hall (demolished 1964)
- Colepike Hall
- Consett Hall
- Coxhoe Hall (demolished 1956)
- Crook Hall (demolished)
- Croxdale Hall
- Dalden Tower (ruined)
- Dene Holme (demolished)
- Dryderdale Hall
- Durham Castle
- Eggleston Hall
- Elemore Hall
- Elton Hall, Stockton-on-Tees (demolished 1910)
- Eshwood Hall (demolished 1930)
- Fen Hall (demolished)
- Gainford Hall
- Greatham Hall (demolished 1962)
- Greencroft Hall (demolished 1955, except stable block)
- Hamsterley Hall
- Harraton Hall (largely demolished, except two rooms now in Lambton Castle)
- Hawthorn Tower (demolished 1969)
- Headlam Hall
- Helmington Hall (demolished)
- Hetton Hall (demolished 1923)
- Hollinside (ruined)
- Holmside Hall (ruined)
- Hoppyland Hall (partially demolished/ruined)
- Horsley Hall
- Houghall Hall (demolished 1966)
- Lambton Castle (replaced Harraton Hall)
- Lambton House (demolished 1797)
- Lartington Hall
- Long Newton Hall (demolished)
- Low Dinsdale Manor
- Ludworth Tower (ruined)
- Lumley Castle
- Mainsforth Hall (demolished 1962)
- Neasham Hall (demolished 1970)
- Newton Cap Hall (demolished)
- Newton Hall, Durham (demolished 1926)
- Old Park, Whitworth (demolished 1901)
- Piercebridge Hall
- Preston Hall, Preston-on-Tees
- Raby Castle
- Red Hall, Haughton-le-Skerne (demolished 1984)
- Redworth Hall
- Rokeby Park
- Shotton Hall
- Sledwish Hall
- Snotterton Hall (demolished 1831)
- Sockburn Hall
- Staindrop Hall (demolished)
- Stanley Hall, Tanfield (demolished)
- Streatlam Castle (demolished 1959, except entrance lodges)
- The Castle, Castle Eden
- The Deanery, Chester-le-Street (demolished 1906)
- The Isle
- The Old Hall, Hurworth-on-Tees
- Thornton Hall, High Coniscliffe
- Thrislington Hall (demolished 1979)
- Trimdon Hall (demolished)
- Tunstall Manor (demolished 1926)
- Walworth Castle
- Westholme Hall
- Whitehill Hall
- Whitworth Hall
- Windlestone Hall
- Witton Castle
- Wolviston Hall (demolished)
- Woodburn, Darlington (demolished 1935)
- Woodside, Darlington (demolished)
- Woodside Hall (demolished)
- Wynyard Park
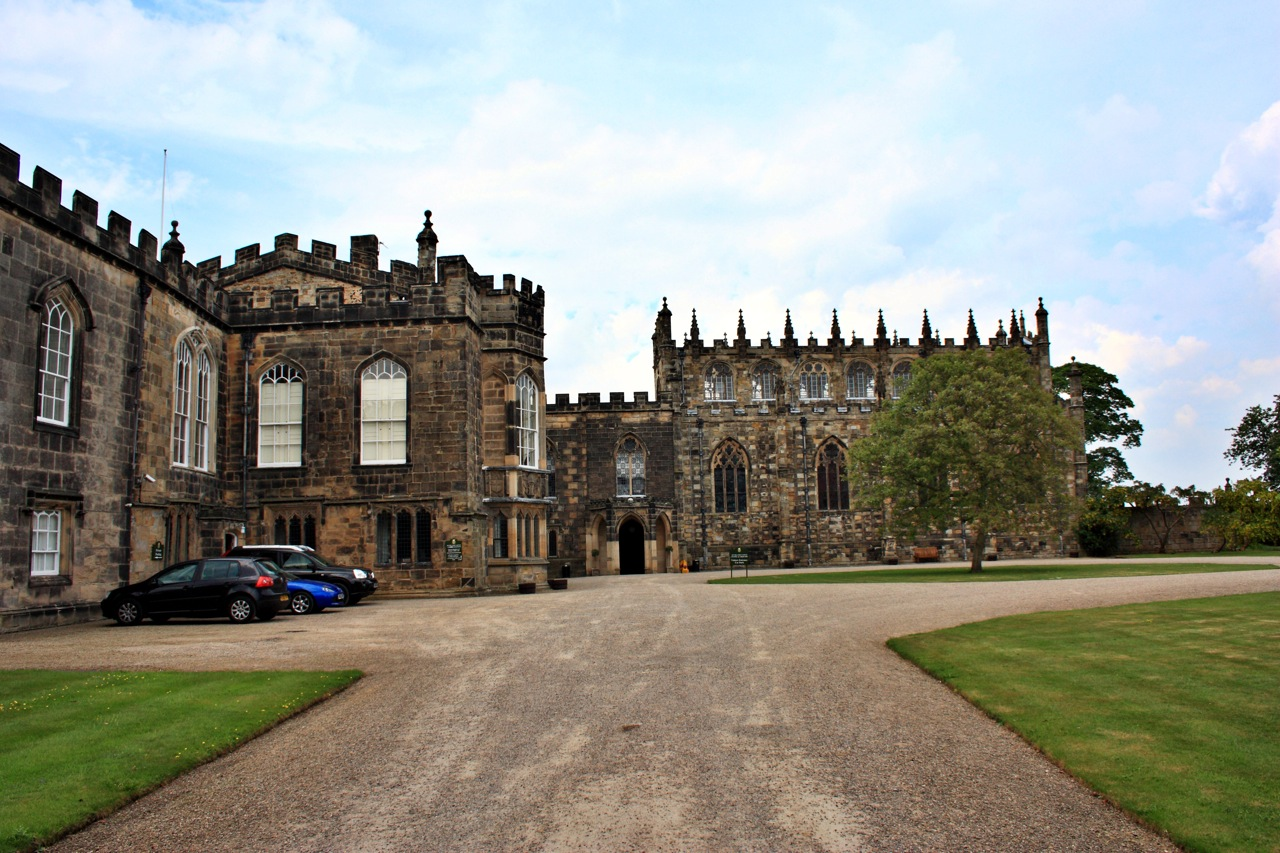
Auckland Castle

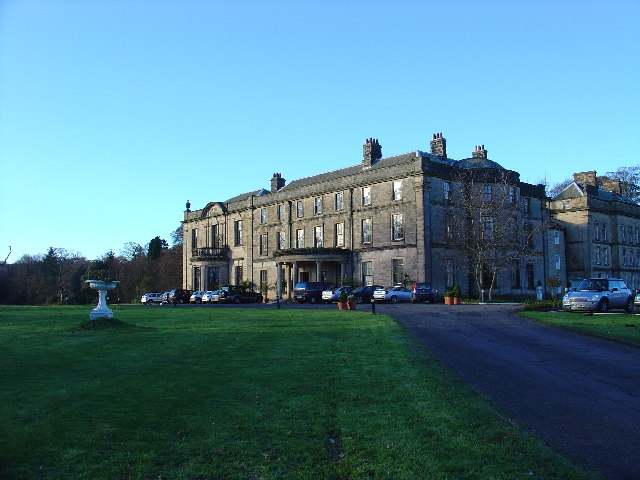
Beamish Hall

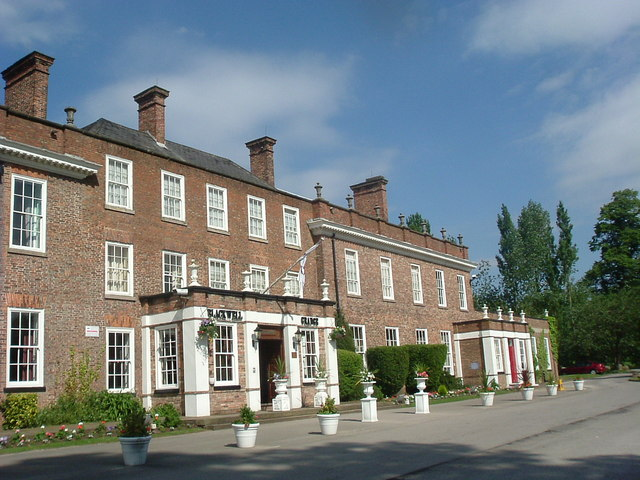
Blackwell Grange Hotel

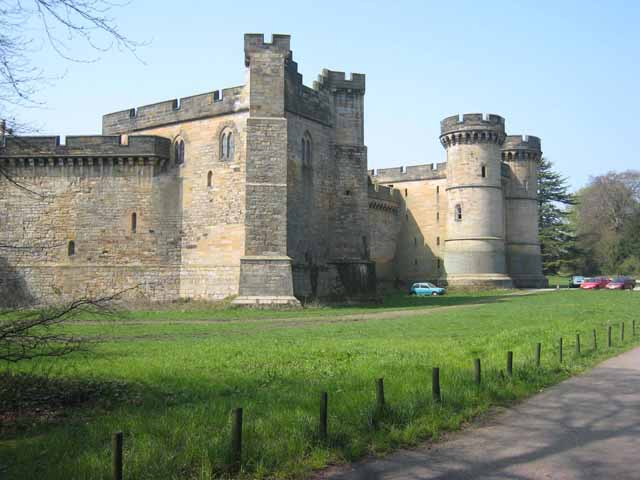
Brancepeth Castle

Crook Hall

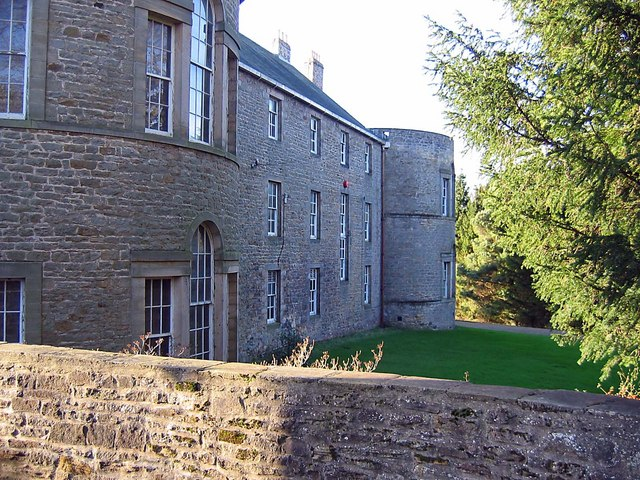
Croxdale Hall

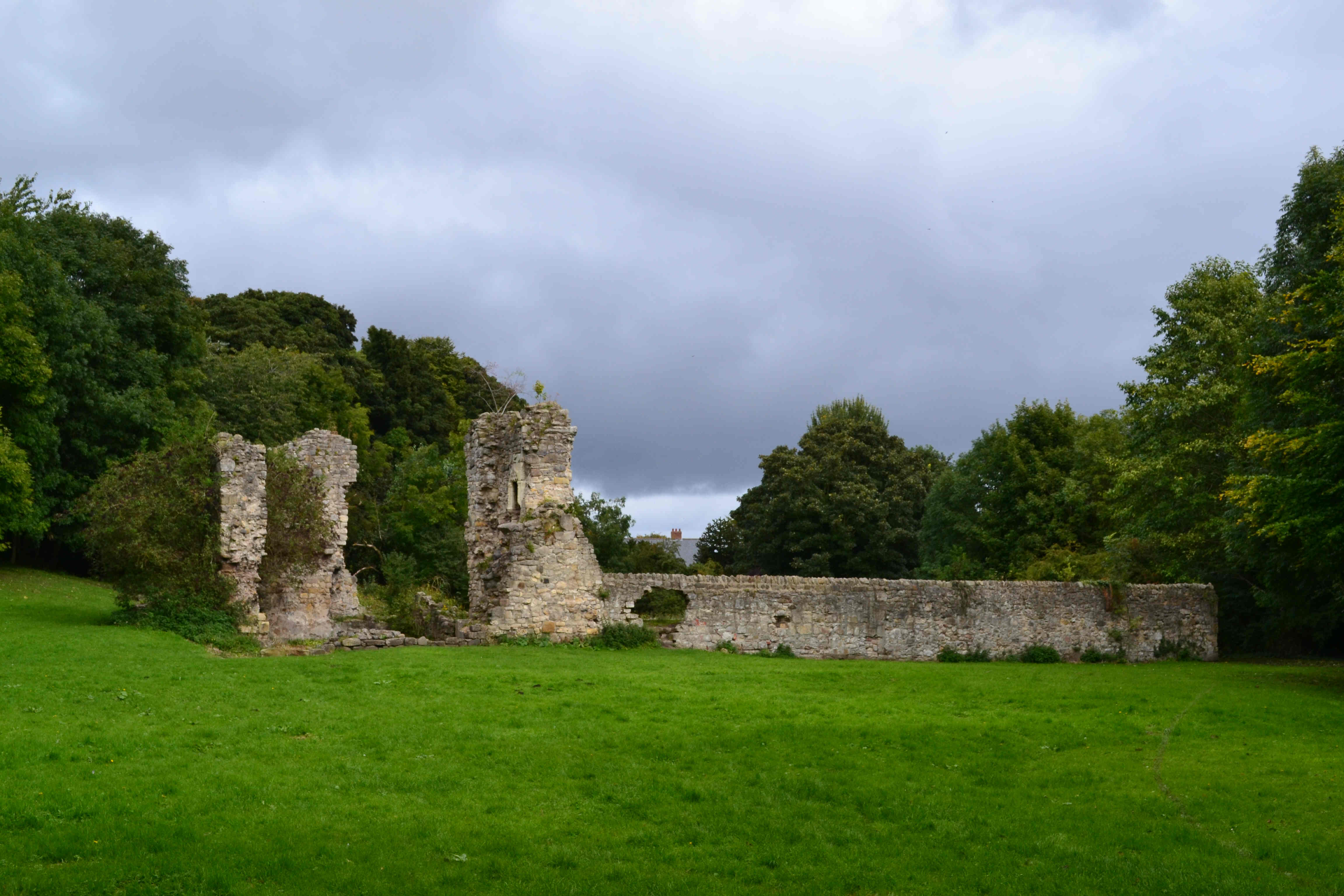
Dalden Tower

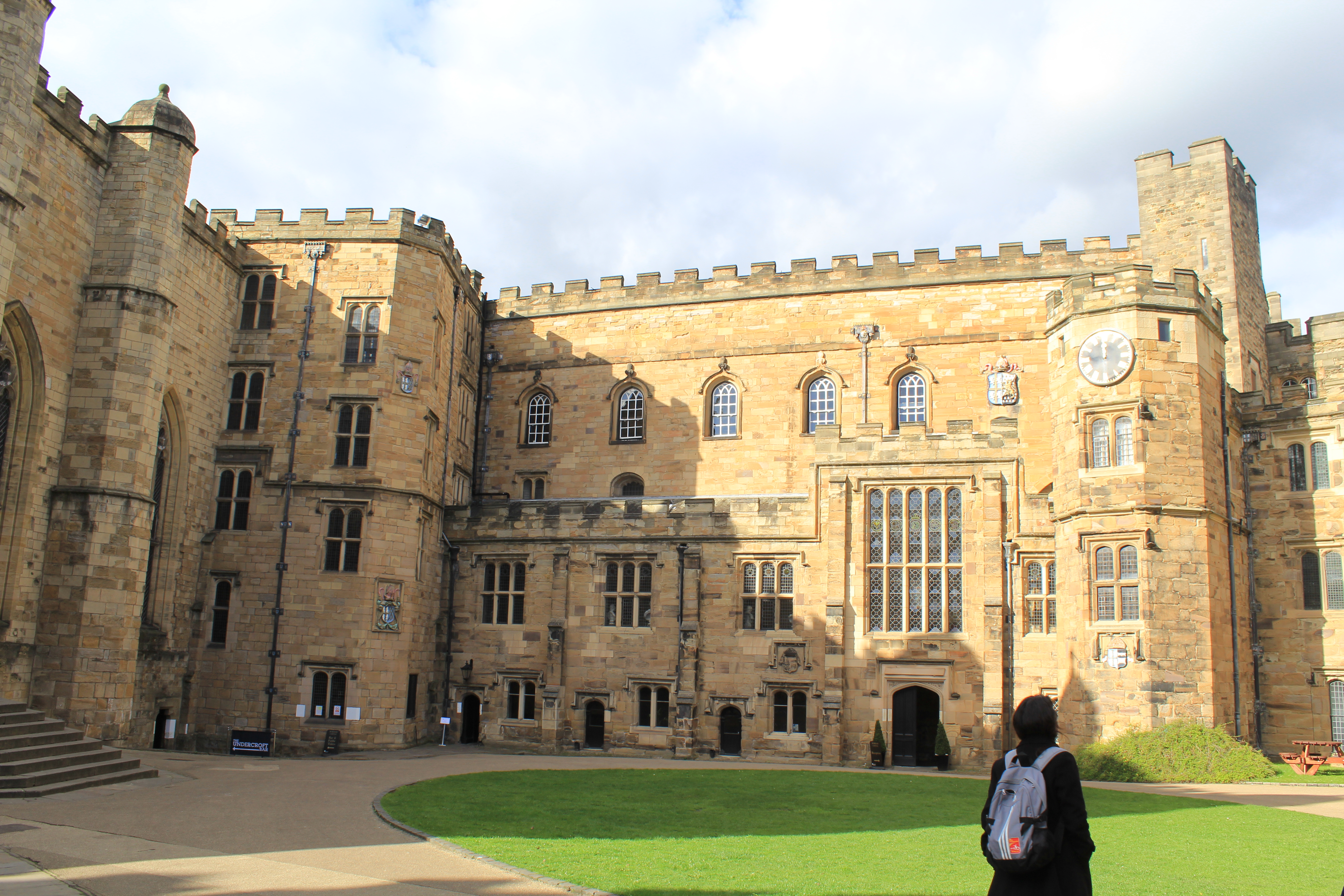
Durham Castle

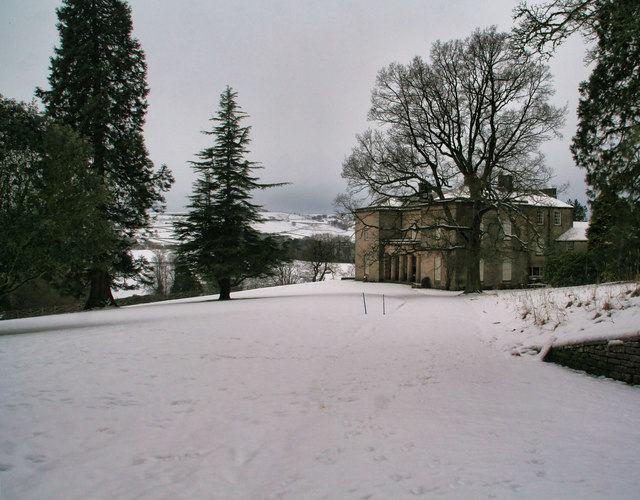
Eggleston Hall

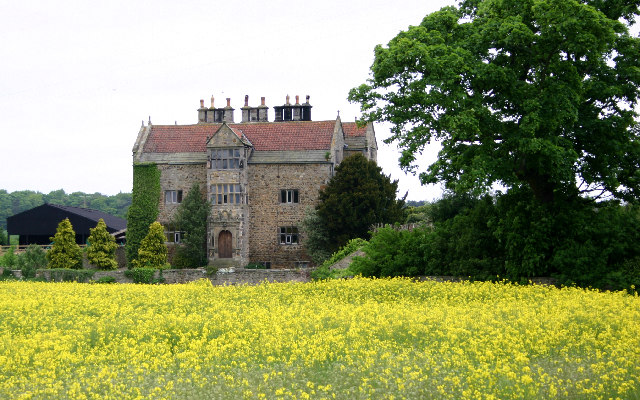
Gainford Hall

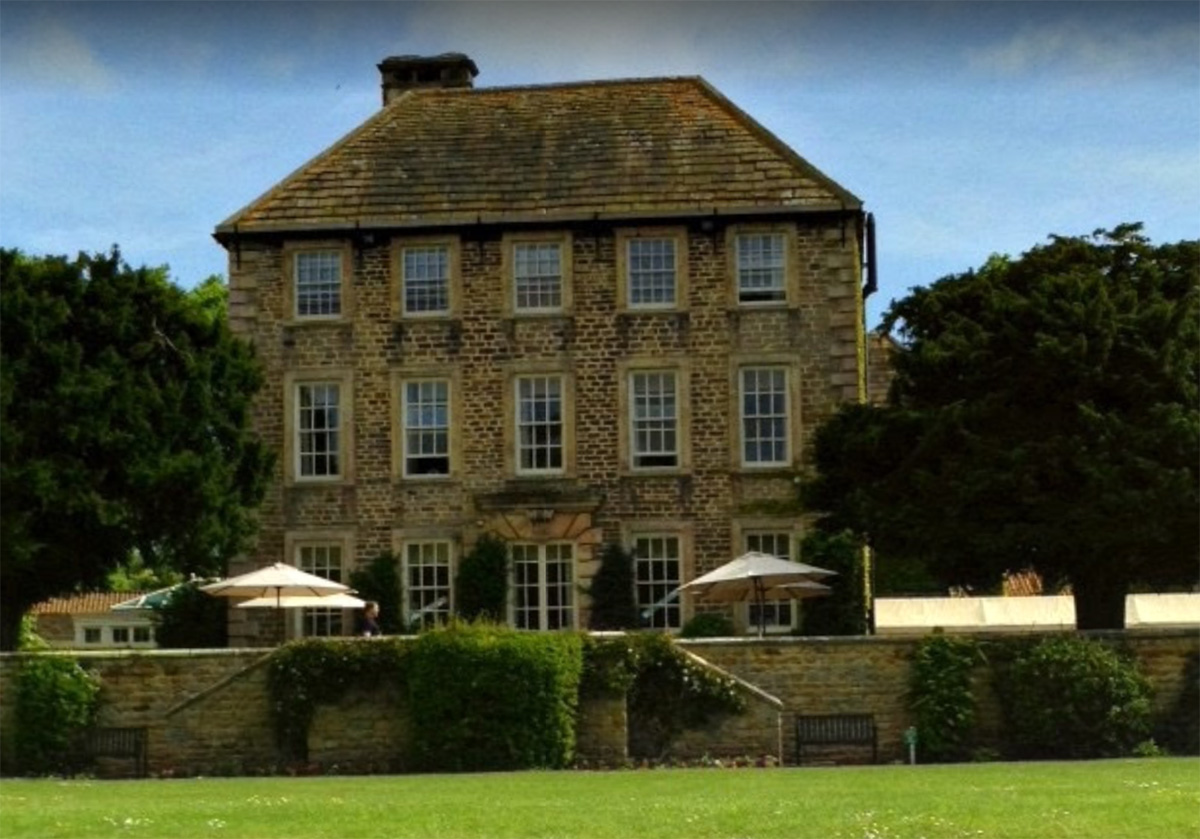
Headlam Hall

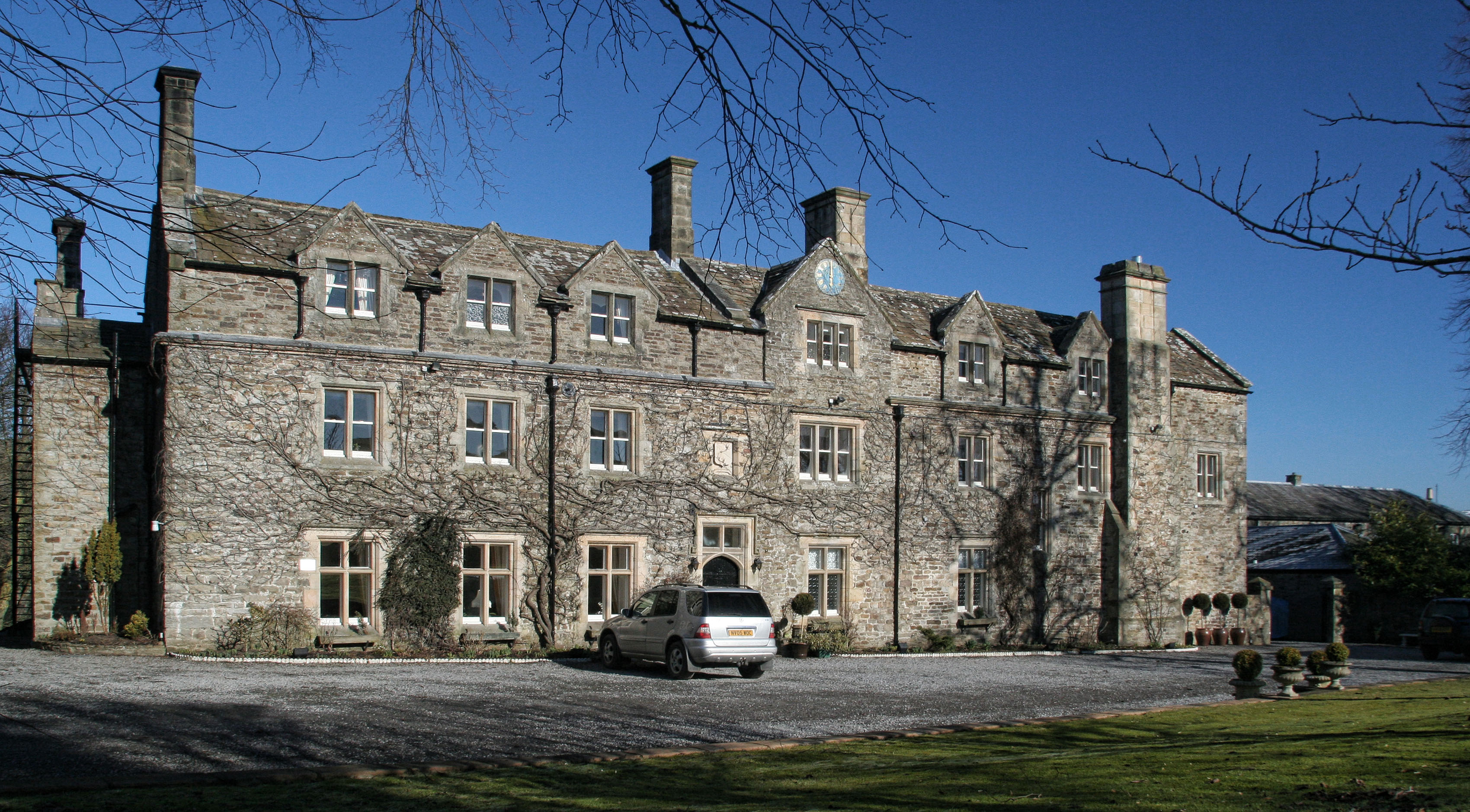
Horsley Hall

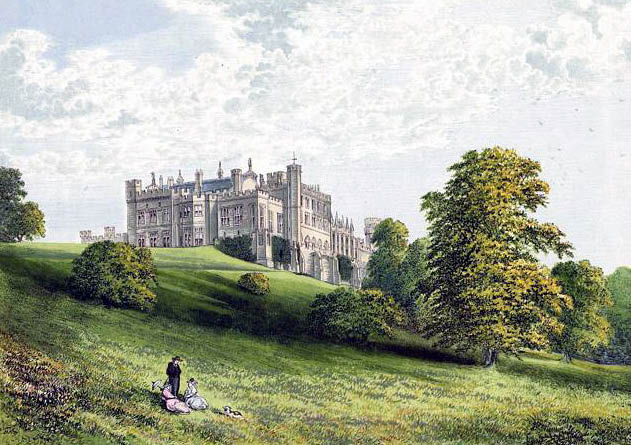
Lambton Castle

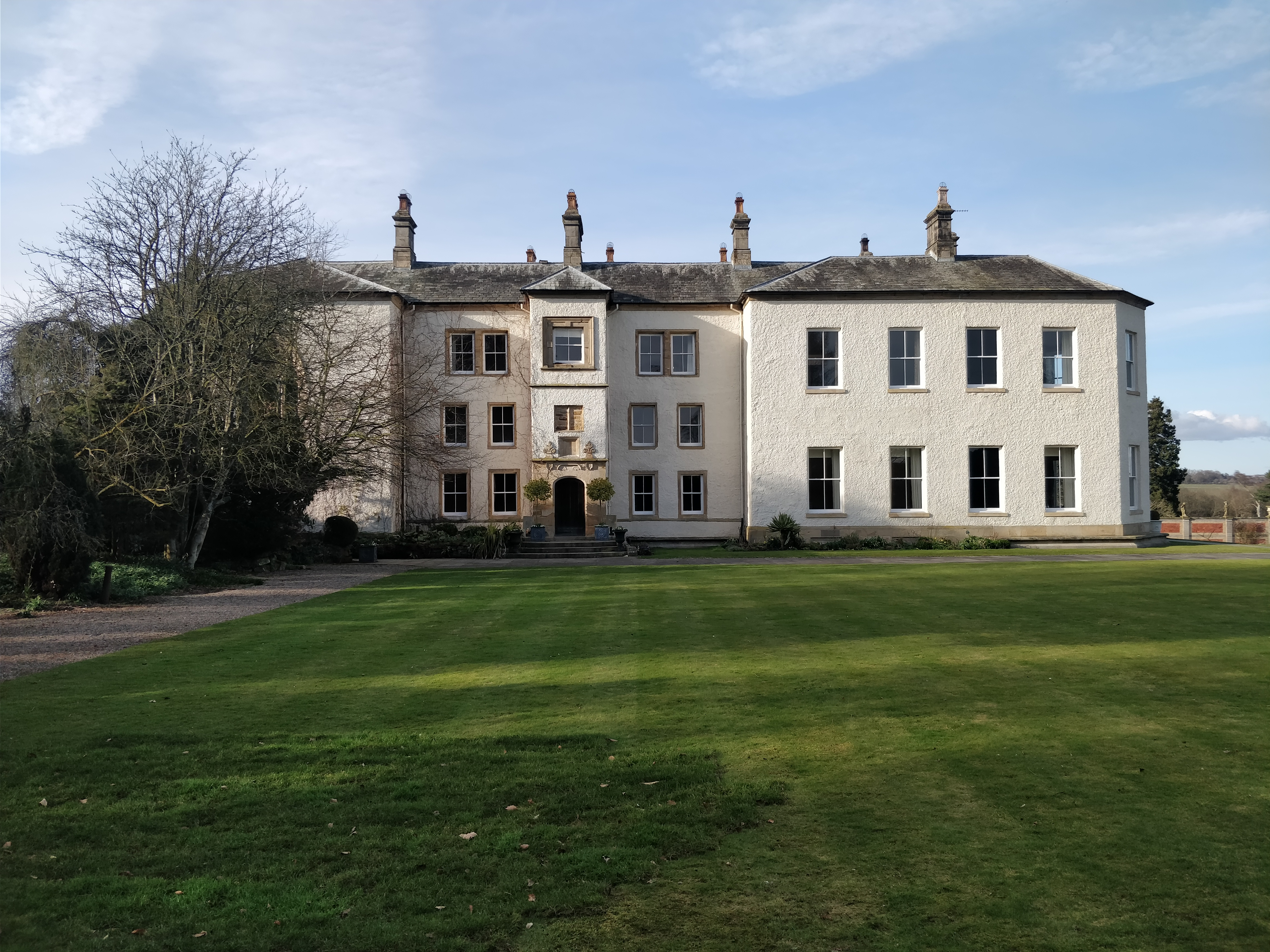
Lartington Hall

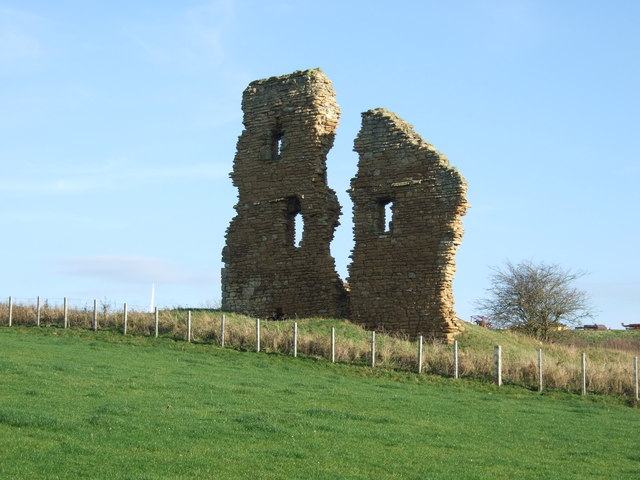
Ludworth Tower

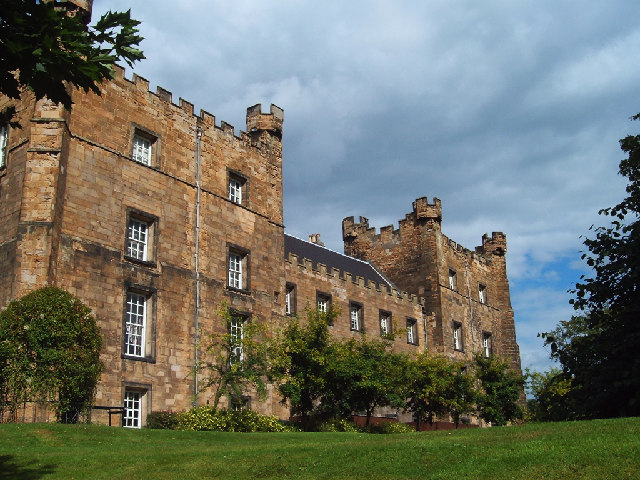
Lumley Castle

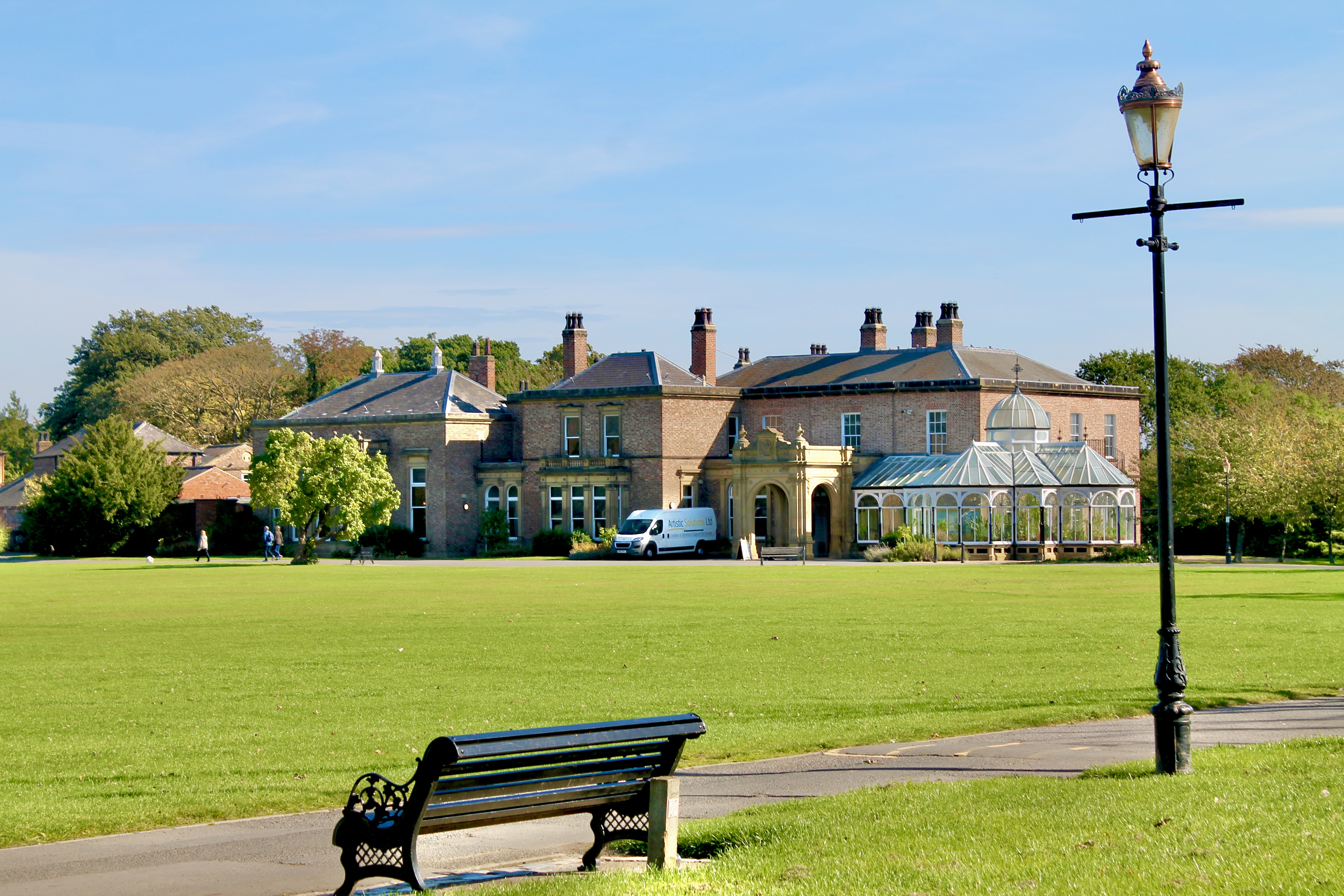
Preston Hall

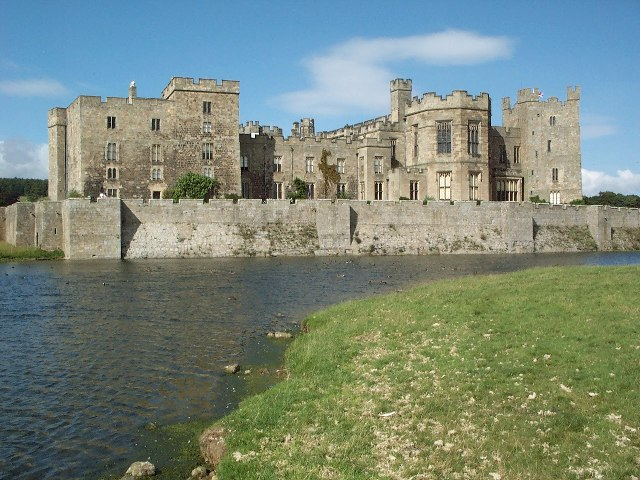
Raby Castle

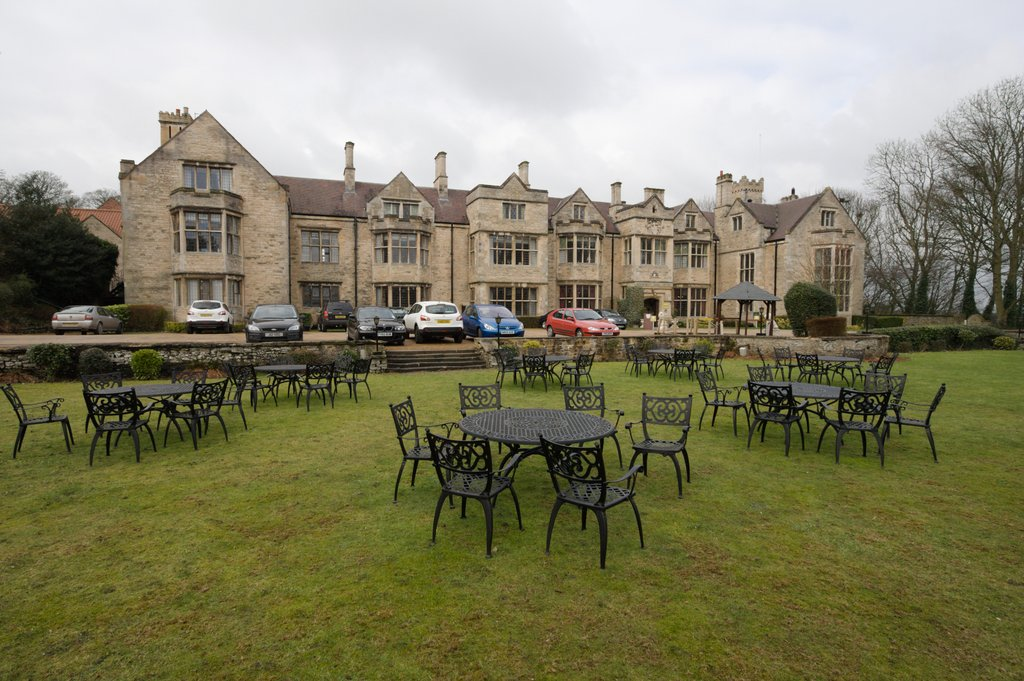
Redworth Hall

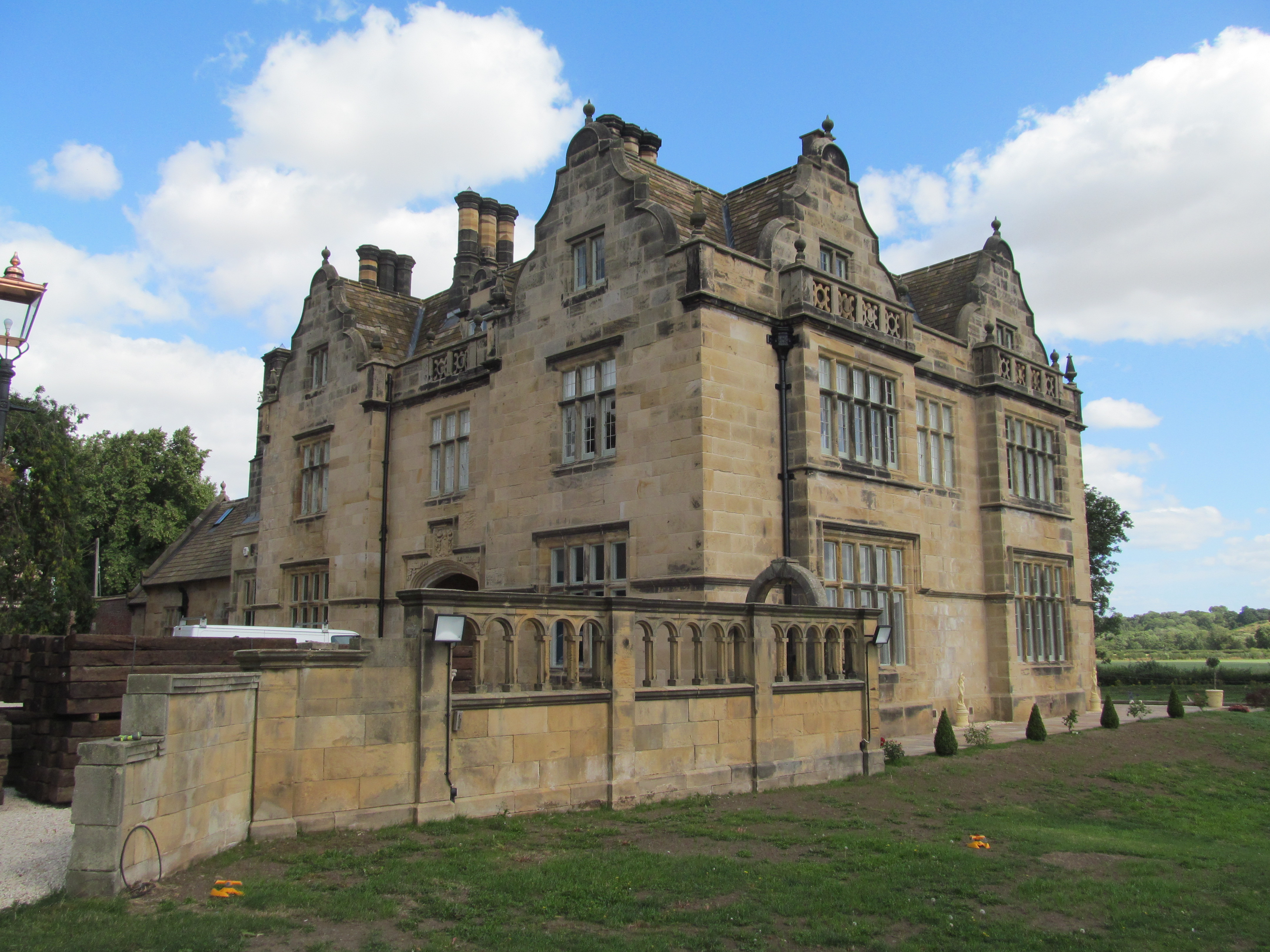
Sockburn Hall

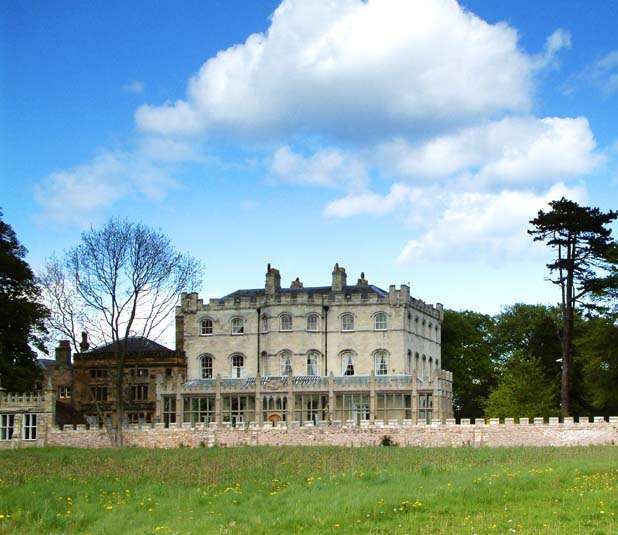
The Castle

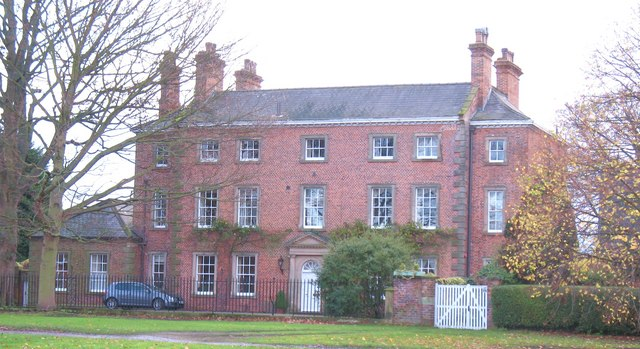
The Old Hall

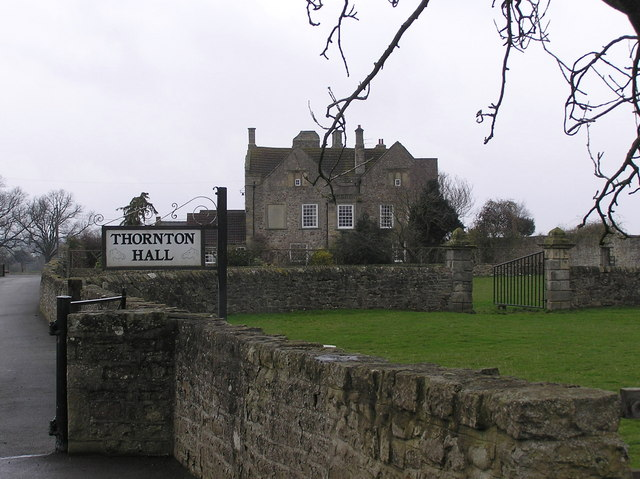
Thornton Hall

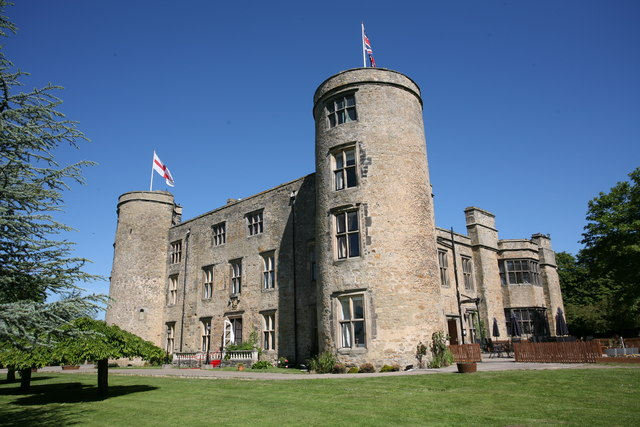
Walworth Castle

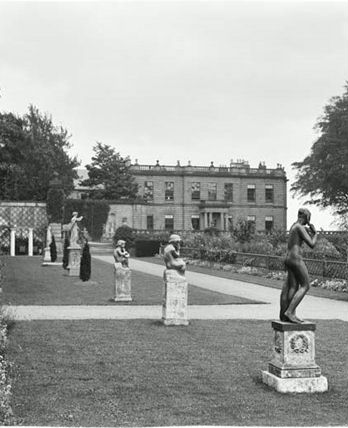
Windlestone Hall

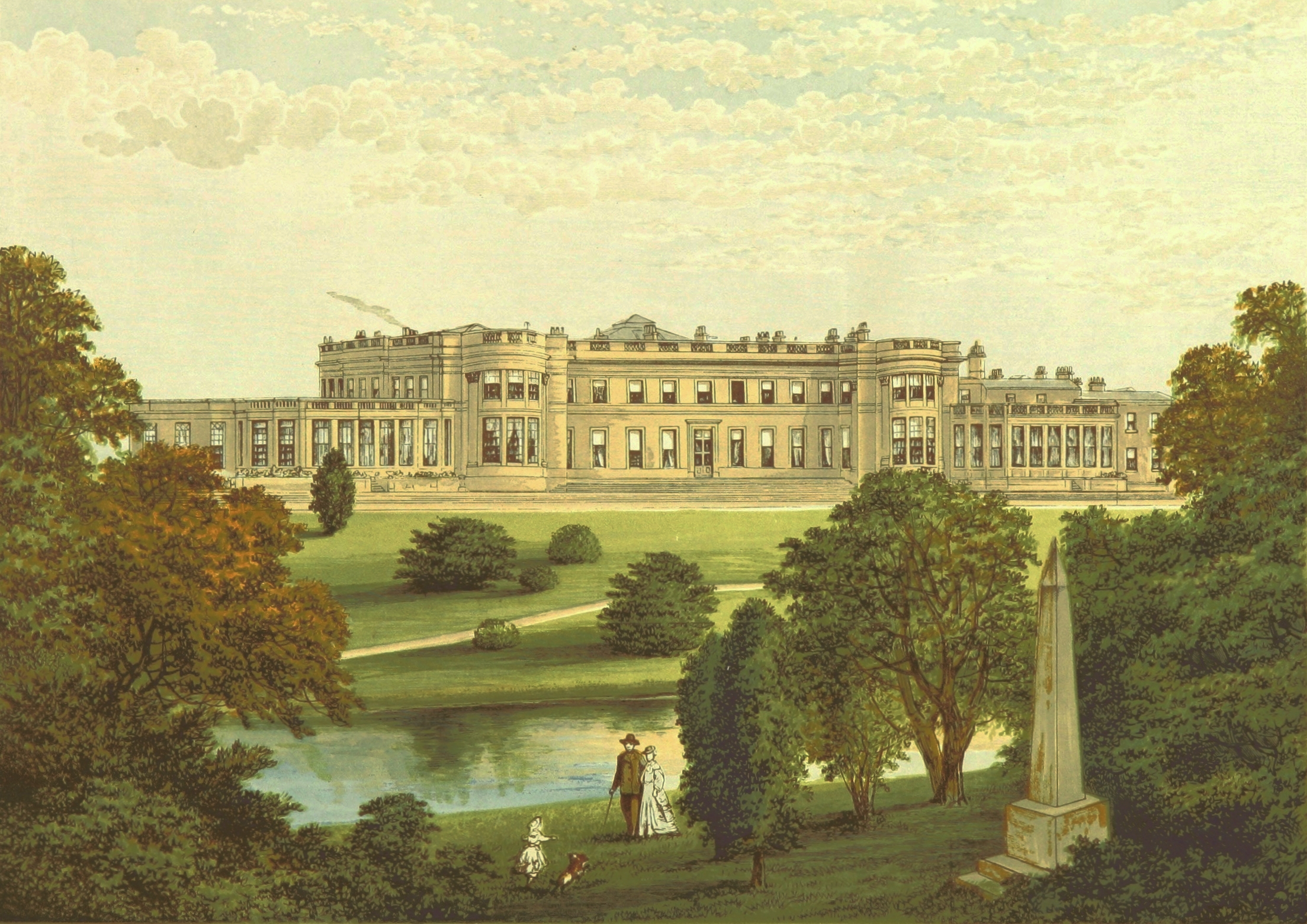
Wynyard Hall

=== East Riding of Yorkshire ===
- Anlaby House
- Boynton Hall
- Brantingham Thorpe
- Burton Agnes Hall
- Burton Agnes Manor House
- Burton Constable Hall
- Cowick Hall
- Dalton Hall (Beverley)
- Garrowby Hall
- Halsham House
- Holme Hall, East Riding of Yorkshire
- Houghton Hall, East Riding of Yorkshire
- Londesborough Hall
- Saltmarshe Hall
- Sewerby Hall
- Sledmere House
- Tranby Croft
- Rise Hall
- Wassand Hall

=== East Sussex ===
- Anne of Cleves House
- Ashburnham Place
- Ashcombe House
- Bateman's
- Beauport Park
- Beeches Farm
- Bentley House
- Brickwall House
- Brightling Park
- Buckwell Place
- Charleston Farmhouse
- Compton Place
- Durhamford Manor
- Fife House
- Firle Place
- Folkington Manor
- Glynde Place
- Glyndebourne
- Great Dixter
- Hammerwood Park
- Haremere Hall
- Hartfield
- Herstmonceux Castle
- The Hoo
- Horsted Place
- Iridge Place
- Lamb House
- Luxford House
- Malling House
- Monk's House
- Moulsecoomb Place
- Normanhurst Court
- Patcham Place
- Plumpton Place
- Preston Manor, Brighton
- Rose Hill
- Sheffield Park Garden
- Stanmer House
- Wargrave House
- Wings Place
- Wootton Manor

=== Essex ===
- Abbotswick
- Audley End House
- Barrington Hall, Essex
- Bassingbourne Hall
- Beeleigh Abbey
- Belchamp Hall
- Belhus, Essex
- Belmont Castle
- Berden Hall
- Blake Hall
- Borley Rectory
- Bower Hall (demolished)
- Braxted Park
- Chigwell Hall
- Coopersale House
- Copped Hall
- Creeksea Place Manor
- Danbury Place
- Debden Hall, Uttlesford (demolished)
- Dial House
- Down Hall
- Dutch Cottage
- Fillol's Hall
- Gosfield Hall
- Hadleigh Castle (ruined)
- Harlowbury
- Hill Hall
- Horham Hall
- Hylands Park
- Ingatestone Hall
- Layer Marney Tower
- Leaden Hall
- Leez Priory
- Marks Hall (demolished)
- Michaelstowe Hall
- Moyns Park
- Orford House
- Orsett Hall
- Oxley House
- Paycocke's
- Shalom Hall
- Spains Hall
- Sturgeons House
- Terling Place

=== Gloucestershire ===
- Abbey House, Cirencester
- Ablington Manor
- Acton Court
- Alderley House
- Badminton House
- Barrington Park
- Barnsley Park
- Berkeley Castle
- Bibury Court
- Boxwell Court
- Brockworth Court
- Calcot Manor
- Chavenage House
- Cirencester House
- Clearwell Castle
- Corse Court
- Daneway House
- Daylesford House
- Dodington Park
- Dyrham Park
- Edgeworth Manor
- Ellenborough Park
- Elmore Court
- Evington House
- Frampton Court
- Fretherne Court
- Gatcombe Park
- Hardwicke Court
- Hasfield Court
- Highgrove House
- Highnam Court
- Horton Court
- Icomb Place
- Kiftsgate Court Gardens
- Kingscote Park
- Lasborough Park
- Lodge Park and Sherborne Estate
- Lydney Park
- Lypiatt Park
- Manor Farmhouse, Temple Guiting
- The Mythe
- Nether Lypiatt Manor
- Newark Park
- Owlpen Manor
- Quarwood
- Rodmarton Manor
- Sezincote House
- Sheppey Corner
- Sherborne House
- Snowshill Manor
- Speech House
- Stanway House
- St Briavels Castle
- Stonehouse Court Hotel
- Stouts Hill
- Stowell Park
- Stratford Park
- Sudeley Castle
- Swangrove
- Swinhay House
- Thornbury Castle
- Toddington Manor
- Tormarton Court
- Tortworth Court
- Trull House
- Wallsworth Hall
- Westonbirt House
- Wick Court, Arlingham
- Wick Court, Wick
- Whittington Court
- Woodchester Mansion
- Wormington Grange

=== Greater London ===
- Addington Palace
- The Albany
- Apsley House
- Arnos Grove House
- Arundel House
- Ashburnham House
- Aubrey House
- Avery Hill
- Ballards, Coombe
- Bath House, Piccadilly
- Beaufort House
- Bedford House, Bloomsbury
- Bedford House, Covent Garden
- Boston Manor House
- Bower House
- Breadalbane House
- Bridgewater House, Westminster
- Brockwell Hall
- Bromley Hall
- Brook House, Mayfair
- Broomfield House (derelict)
- Bruce Castle
- Buckingham House, Pall Mall
- Buckingham Palace
- Burgh House
- Burlington House
- Bushy House
- Cambridge House
- Camelford House
- Camden Place
- Canons Park
- Carlton House
- Carlyle's House
- Carshalton House
- Chandos House
- Chapel House, Twickenham
- Charlton House
- The Charterhouse
- Chatham House
- Chessington Hall
- Chesterfield House
- Chiswick House
- Clarence House
- Clarendon House
- Copped Hall (demolished, was in Hertfordshire)
- Cranham Hall
- Crewe House
- Crofton Roman Villa
- Crosby Place
- Croydon Palace
- Cumberland House
- Danson House
- Debenham House
- Devonshire House
- Devonshire House, Battersea
- Dollis Hill House (demolished)
- Dorchester House
- Down House
- Dover House
- Dudley House
- Eagle House
- Eastbury Manor House
- Eltham Palace
- Ely Place
- Edgwarebury Hotel
- Essex House
- Fenton House
- Forty Hall
- Fulham Palace
- Garden Corner
- Grim's Dyke
- Grosvenor House
- Grovelands Park
- Gunnersbury Park
- Hall Place
- Ham House
- Hampton Court
- Harcourt House
- Hare Hall
- Hertford House
- Highgrove House, Eastcote
- Hillingdon House
- Hogarth's House
- Holland House
- Holwood House
- Home House
- Ickenham Hall
- Keats' House
- Kelmscott House
- Kensington Palace
- Kenwood House
- Kew Palace
- Kneller Hall
- Lambeth Palace
- Lancaster House
- Langtons
- Lansdowne House
- Lauderdale House
- Leighton House
- Lichfield House
- Lindsey House
- Little Holland House
- Lowther Lodge
- Marble Hill House
- Marlborough House
- Monkhams (demolished, was in Essex)
- Montagu House, Bloomsbury
- Montagu House, Whitehall
- Newcastle House
- Old Rectory, Wimbledon
- Orleans House
- Ormonde House
- Osterley Park
- Pembroke House, Richmond
- Pembroke House, Whitehall
- Pitzhanger Manor
- Pope's villa
- Powis House
- Queen's House
- Queensberry House
- Rainham Hall
- Ranger's House
- Red House, several places
- Ruskin House
- Rutland House
- Savoy Palace
- Schomberg House
- Shene Manor (demolished, was in Surrey)
- Sir Thomas Gresham's House
- Sloane Place
- Southside House
- Spencer House
- Stotfold
- Strawberry Hill
- Streatham Park
- Sutton House
- Swakeleys House
- Syon Park
- Thatched House Lodge
- Trent Park
- Valence House
- Vanbrugh Castle
- Wanstead House
- Wesley's House
- Water House
- White Lodge
- The Wick
- Wickham Court
- Wimbourne House
- Winchester Palace
- Winfield House
- Witanhurst
- Woodlands House
- York House, St. James's Palace
- York House, Strand
- York House, Twickenham

=== Greater Manchester ===
- 84 Plymouth Grove
- Abney Hall
- Agecroft Hall (moved to USA)
- Alkrington Hall
- Ancoats Hall (demolished)
- Atherton Hall, Leigh (demolished)
- Baguley Hall
- Bamford Hall (demolished)
- Barlow Hall
- Belfield Hall (demolished)
- Birchley Hall
- Bramall Hall
- Clayton Hall
- Clegg Hall
- Dunham Massey Hall
- Flixton House
- Foxdenton Hall
- Haigh Hall
- Hall-i'-th'-Wood
- Heaton Hall
- Hopwood Hall
- Hulton Park (demolished)
- Lostock Hall (demolished)
- Manley Hall (demolished)
- Mellor Hall
- Morleys Hall
- Mottram Old Hall
- Ordsall Hall
- Slade Hall
- Smithills Hall
- Staircase House
- Stayley Hall
- Tonge Hall
- Underbank Hall
- Walshaw Hall
- Wardley Hall
- Westhoughton Hall (demolished)
- Winstanley Hall
- Woodbank, Stockport
- Woodfold Hall
- Worsley New Hall (demolished)
- Worsley Old Hall
- Wythenshawe Hall

=== Hampshire ===
- Abbess Grange
- Amport House
- Avington Park
- Barclay House
- Basing House
- Basing Park
- Beaulieu Palace House
- Bentworth Hall
- Bisterne Manor
- Bourne House, East Woodhay
- Bramshill House
- Breamore House
- Broadlands
- Burkham House
- Cams Hall
- Chawton House
- Cranbury Park
- Dogmersfield Park
- The Elms (Bedhampton)
- Elvetham Hall
- Eversley Manor
- Exbury House
- Farnborough Hill
- Hackwood Park
- Hall Place (Bentworth)
- Headley Grange
- Heckfield Place
- Highclere Castle
- Highfield House, Heckfield
- Hill Place
- Hinton Admiral
- Hinton Ampner
- Houghton Lodge
- Hursley House
- Jane Austen's House Museum
- King's House, Winchester
- Lainston House
- Marshcourt
- Melchet Court
- Minley Manor
- Mottisfont Abbey
- Northington Grange
- Oakley Hall
- Old Alresford House
- Ovington House
- Pax Hill
- Redenham Park
- Rhinefield House
- Roke Manor
- Rotherfield Park
- Silchester House
- Somerley
- South Stoneham House
- Southwick House
- Stargroves
- Stratfield Saye House
- Stratton Park
- Sydmonton Court
- Thedden Grange
- Titchfield Abbey
- The Vyne
- Tylney Hall
- The Wakes
- West Green House
- West Park (demolished)
- Wivelrod Manor
- Wymering Manor

=== Herefordshire ===
- Abbey Dore Court
- Allt Yr Ynys Country Hotel
- Bishopswood House
- Belmont House
- Berrington Hall
- Brampton Bryan Hall
- Brinsop Court
- Brockhampton Estate
- Burghill Manor
- Burton Court
- Castle Frome
- Croft Castle
- Cwm
- Dinmore Manor
- Dippersmoor Manor
- Docklow Manor
- Downton Castle
- Eastnor Castle
- Eardisley Park
- Eye Manor
- Ganarew Manor House
- Gatley Park
- Great Marcle Manor
- Hampton Court
- Harewood Park
- Hellens
- Hill Court Manor
- Homme House
- Kentchurch Court
- Kingston Manor
- Kinnersley Castle
- Kyre Park
- Leinthall Manor
- Lemore Manor
- Little Hereford Manor
- Llanrothal Court
- Lower Brockhampton House
- Lude Manor
- Marden Manor
- Moccas Court
- Pengethley Manor Hotel
- Penrhos Court
- Shobdon Court
- Stoke Edith House (ruined)
- Sufton Court
- The Mynde
- Upleden Manor
- Whitbourne Hall
- Wilts Knill Court
- Wyastone Leys

=== Hertfordshire ===
- Albury Hall (demolished)
- Ashwell Bury
- Aston Bury
- Balls Park
- Bayfordbury
- Beckingham Palace
- Beechwood Park
- Berkhamsted Place
- Brocket Hall
- Buntingford Manor House
- Bushey Hall
- Cassiobury House (demolished)
- Cell Park (Markyate Cell)
- Champneys
- Cheshunt Great House
- Childwickbury Manor
- Dyrham Park Country Club
- Egerton House, Berkhamsted
- Fanhams Hall
- The Frythe
- Gaddesden Place
- Gadebridge House
- Golden Parsonage
- Old Gorhambury House
- The Grove, Watford
- Hanbury Manor
- Hanstead House
- Hatfield House
- High Elms Manor
- Hilfield Castle
- Hinxworth Place
- Holywell House (demolished)
- Hunsdon House
- Hunton Park
- Knebworth House
- Langleybury
- Lululaund
- Moor Park
- Moor Place
- Much Hadham Hall
- Much Hadham Palace
- Newsells Park
- Panshanger
- Pendley Manor
- Putteridge Bury
- Red House, Buntingford
- Rossway
- Rothamsted Manor
- Rye House
- Shaw's Corner
- Shendish Manor
- Shenley Hall
- Sopwell House
- Stocks House
- Theobalds House
- Tolmers Park
- Tring Park Mansion
- Tyttenhanger House
- Verulam House
- Wall Hall
- Westbrook Hay
- Westbury Nernewtes Manor
- Woodhall Park
- Wormleybury
- Wrotham Park
- Wymondley Bury

=== Isle of Wight ===
- Adgestone Manor
- Alverstone Manor
- Appleford Manor
- Appley House
- Appley Towers
- Appuldurcombe House
- Apse Manor
- Arreton Manor
- Ashey Manor
- Bagwich Manor
- Barnsley Manor
- Barton Manor, Whippingham
- Bathingbourne Manor
- Beauchamp Manor
- Bigbury Manor
- Billingham Manor
- Blackpan Manor
- Bleakdown Manor
- Bonchurch Manor
- Borthwood Manor
- Branston Manor
- Bridge Manor
- Briddlesford Manor
- Caines Court
- Chillingwood Manor
- Clavells Manor
- Cleaveland Manor
- Combley Manor
- Court Manor
- Dimbola Lodge
- Durton Manor
- East Cowes Castle
- East Shamlord Manor
- Edington Manor
- Fairlee Manor
- Farringford House
- Gatcombe House
- Great Budbridge Manor
- Great East Standen Manor
- Grove Manor
- Hale Manor
- Hardingshute Manor
- Hardley Manor
- Haseley Manor
- Haven Street Manor
- Hill Manor
- Holloway Manor
- Horringford Manor
- Huffingford Manor
- Kennerly Manor
- Kern Manor
- Knighton Gorges Manor
- Landguard Manor
- Langbridge Manor
- Landguard Manor
- Lee Manor
- Lessland Manor
- Lisle Combe
- Luccombe Manor
- Merstone Manor
- Milton Manor
- Mirables
- Morton Manor
- Munsley Manor
- Nettlestone Manor
- Norris Castle
- Nunwell Manor
- Osborne House
- Pan Manor
- Park Manor
- Perreton Manor
- Pidford Manor
- Preston Manor
- Princelet Manor
- Puckpool Manor
- Quarr Abbey House
- Redway Manor
- Rew Manor
- Rookley Manor
- Roud Manor
- Rowborough Manor
- Ryde Manor
- Rylstone Manor
- Sandford Manor
- Sandown Manor
- Scotlesford Manor
- Shanklin Manor
- Sheat Manor
- Shide Manor
- Smallbrook Manor
- Span Manor
- St. Clare Castle
- St. Lawrence Manor
- Standen House
- Staplehurst Manor
- Steephill Manor
- Stenbury Manor
- Swainston Manor
- Thorley Manor
- Wackland Manor
- Week Manor
- Westbrook Manor
- Westcourt Manor
- West Shamlord Manor
- Whitefield Manor
- Winston Manor
- Wode Manor
- Wolverton Manor
- Woodhouse Manor
- Woodlands Vale
- Woolverton Manor
- Wooton Manor
- Wroxall Manor
- Yaverland Manor

=== Kent ===
- Agnes Court
- Allington Castle
- Archbishop's Palace, Maidstone
- Barham Court
- Beachborough Manor
- Belmont House and Gardens
- Betteshanger House
- Bleak House, Broadstairs
- Boughton Place
- Boughton Monchelsea Place
- Bradbourne House
- Broome Park
- Charlton Park, Canterbury
- Chartwell
- Chevening
- Chiddingstone Castle
- Chilham Castle
- Cobham Hall
- Doddington Place
- Dorton House
- Eastwell Park
- Eyhorne Manor
- Finchcocks
- Franks Hall
- Gads Hill Place
- Godinton House
- The Grange, Ramsgate
- Great Maytham Hall
- Goodnestone Park
- Hadlow Castle
- Hever Castle
- Higham Park
- Holcombe Manor
- Hole Park
- Hollingbourne Manor
- Hollingbourne House
- Howletts
- Ingress Abbey
- The Hospital of St Thomas, Canterbury
- Ightham Mote
- Kingsgate Castle
- Knole House
- Knowlton Court
- Lee Priory (demolished)
- Leeds Castle
- Linton Park
- Long Barn
- Lullingstone Castle
- Lympne Castle
- Mereworth Castle
- Mersham le Hatch
- Mote Park
- Olantigh
- Old Soar Manor
- Owletts
- Owl House
- Oxon Hoath
- Pattyndenne Manor
- Penshurst Place
- Port Lympne Mansion
- Preston Hall, Aylesford
- Quebec House
- Quex Park
- Restoration House
- Riverhill House
- Roydon Hall
- The Salutation
- Scotney Castle
- Scot's Hall (demolished)
- Sharsted Court
- Sheriffs Court, Minster
- Somerhill House
- Spade House
- Squerryes Court
- St Clere, Kent
- Surrenden House (demolished)
- Temple Manor
- Tudor House
- Waldershare Park
- Walmer Castle

=== Lancashire ===
- Abbeystead House
- Adlington Hall (demolished)
- Aldcliffe Hall (demolished)
- Alkincoats Hall (demolished)
- Alston Hall
- Ashton Hall
- Astley Hall
- Bank Hall
- Bardsea Hall (demolished)
- Billinge Scar (demolished)
- Blythe Hall, Lathom
- Borwick Hall
- Browsholme Hall
- Bryn Hall
- Buckshaw Hall
- Burrow Hall
- Capernwray Hall
- Carr House
- Chingle Hall
- Croston Hall (demolished)
- Cuerden Hall
- Downham Hall
- Dunnow Hall
- Duxbury Hall (demolished)
- Eaves Hall
- Emmott Hall (demolished)
- Escowbeck
- Extwistle Hall (derelict)
- Gawthorpe Hall
- Gillibrand Hall
- Gisburne Park
- Greaves Hall (demolished)
- Hammerton Hall
- Hazelwood Hall
- Heskin Hall
- Hoghton Tower
- Hollinshead Hall (ruined)
- Holme Hall (ruined)
- Hornby Castle
- Huntroyde Hall
- Lathom House (demolished)
- Leck Hall
- Leighton Hall
- Littledale Hall
- Lytham Hall
- Martholme
- Mawdesley Hall
- Mitton Hall
- Moor Hall, Aughton
- New Hall, Edenfield
- Old Hall, Great Mitton
- Quernmore Park
- Read Hall and Park
- Rivington Hall
- Rossall Hall
- Rufford New Hall
- Rufford Old Hall
- Runshaw Hall
- Samlesbury Hall
- Scarisbrick Hall
- Shaw Hall, Leyland
- Shaw Hill
- Shuttleworth Hall
- The Old Zoo
- Thurland Castle
- Thurnham Hall
- Towneley Hall
- Tulketh Hall (demolished)
- Turton Tower
- Waddington Old Hall
- Waddow Hall
- Wennington Hall
- Whittington Hall
- Winmarleigh Hall
- Woodfold Hall
- Wrightington Hall
- Wycoller Hall (ruined)
- Wyresdale Hall
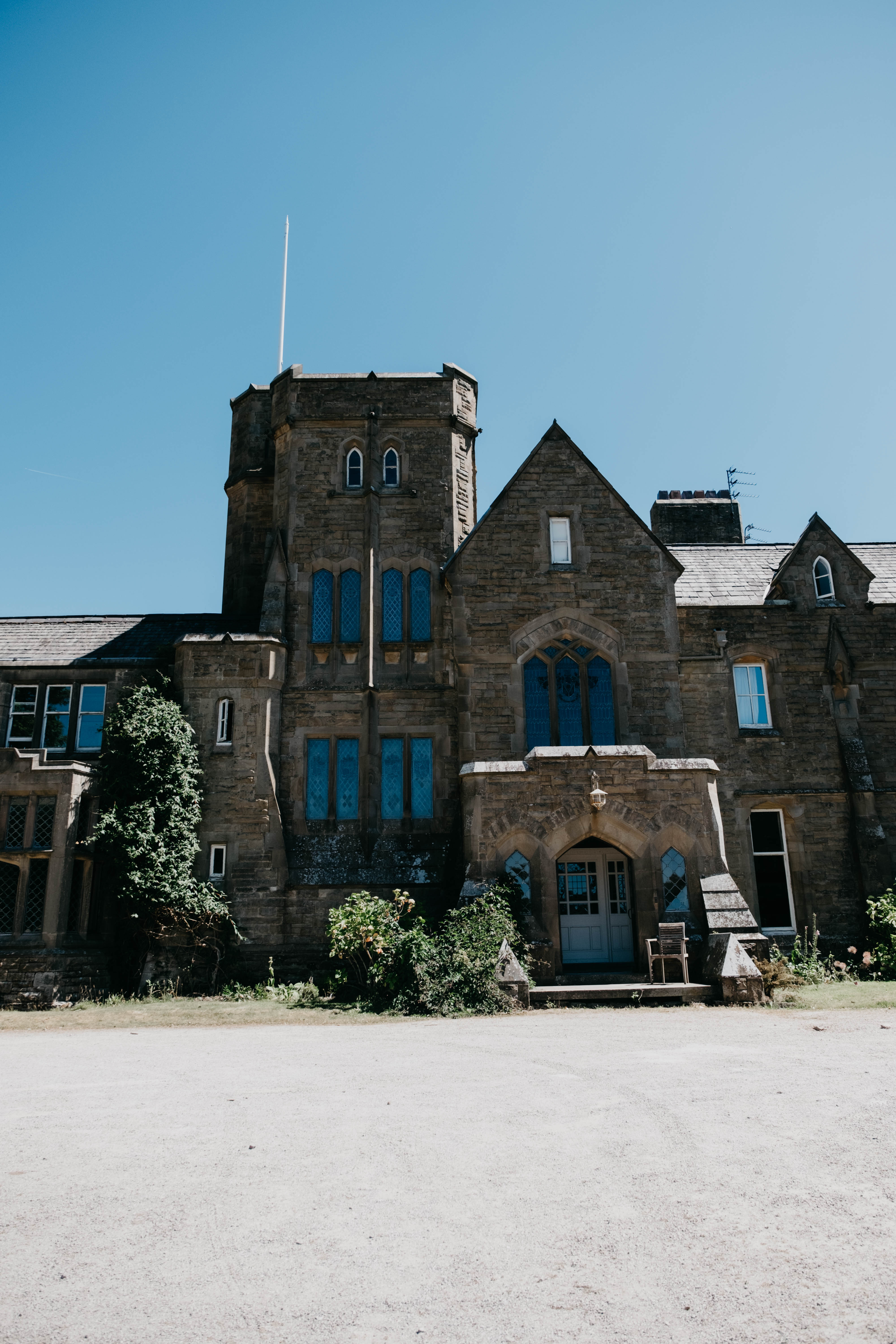
Wyresdale Park

=== Leicestershire ===
- Ab Kettleby Manor
- Appleby Manor
- Asfordby Hall
- Ashby de la Zouch Castle
- Ashby Folville Manor
- Ashmede Hall
- Aston Flamville Manor
- Baggrave Hall
- Bardon Hall
- Barkby Hall
- Beaumanor Hall
- Beeby Manor
- Belgrave Hall
- Belvoir Castle
- Billesdon Coplow
- Bosworth Hall (Husbands Bosworth)
- Bosworth Hall (Market Bosworth)
- Bradgate House 1520
- Bradgate House 1856
- Brentingby Hall
- Brooksby Hall
- Buckminster Hall
- Burleigh Hall
- Burrough on the Hill Manor
- Burton Hall
- Cadeby Manor
- Carlton Curlieu Hall
- Castle Rock House
- Cold Overton Hall
- Coleorton Hall
- Cosby Hall
- Cotesbach Manor
- Coton Priory
- Dalby Old Hall
- Desford Old Hall
- Dishley Grange
- Donington Hall
- Donington le Heath Manor House Museum
- Eastwell Hall
- Edmondthorpe Hall
- Enderby House
- Frolesworth House
- Gaddesby Hall
- Galby Manor
- Garendon Hall
- Goadby Hall
- Gopsall Hall
- Grace Dieu Manor
- Great Glen Hall
- Groby Old Hall
- Gumley Hall
- Hallaton Manor
- Hemington Hall
- Ingarsby Old Hall
- Keythorpe Hall
- Kibworth Hall
- King's Norton Manor
- Kirby Park
- Kirby Muxloe Castle
- Langton Hall
- Launde Abbey
- Leire House
- Little Stretton Manor
- Lockington Hall
- Loddington Hall
- Long Clawson Old Manor
- Lowesby Hall
- Measham Hall
- Medbourne Manor
- Medbourne Old Hall
- Morebarne Grange
- Narborough Hall
- Nether Hall
- Nevill Holt Hall
- Newbold Verdon Hall
- New House Grange
- Newton Harcourt Manor
- Noseley Hall
- Orton Hall
- Osbaston Hall
- Othorpe House
- Papillon Hall, Lubenham
- Peatling Parva Hall
- Potters Marston Hall
- Prestwold Hall
- Quenby Hall
- Quorn Hall
- Ragdale Old Hall (demolished)
- Ragdale New Hall
- Ratcliffe Hall
- Ravenstone Hall
- Rothley Temple
- Saxelby Manor
- Scalford Hall
- Scraptoft Hall
- Sheepy Hall
- Shenton Hall
- Shoby Priory
- Skeffington Hall
- Stanford Hall
- Stapleford Park
- Stoughton Grange
- Staunton Harold Hall
- Stockerston Hall
- Stonton Wyville Manor
- Stretton Hall
- Sutton Cheney Manor
- Swithland Hall
- Tur Langton Manor
- Whatton Hall
- Wigston Parva Hall
- Willesley Hall (demolished)
- Willoughby Waterleys Old Hall
- Wistow Hall
- Withcote Hall
- Wykin Hall
- Wymondham Manor
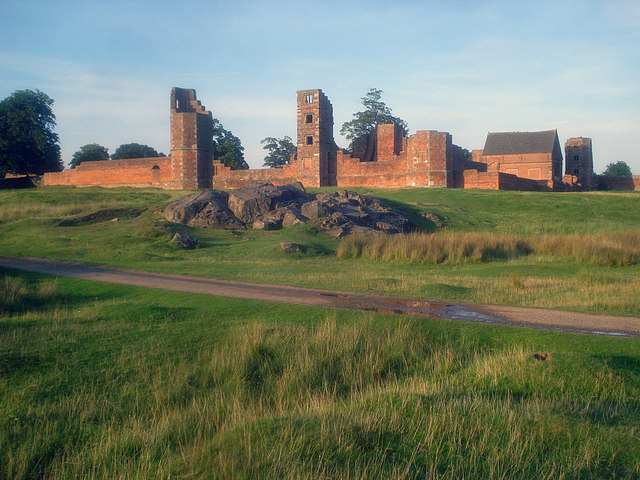
Bradgate House 1520

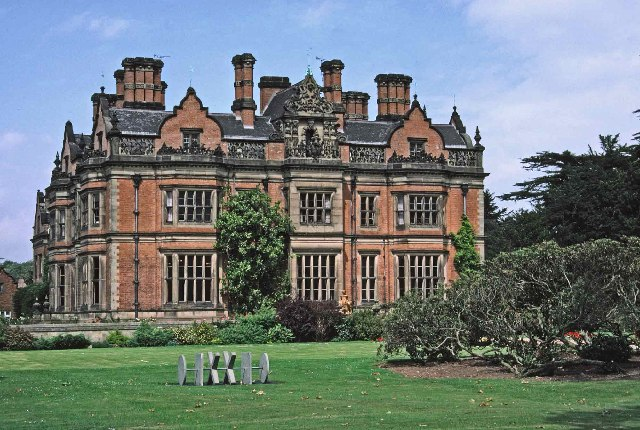
Beaumanor Hall

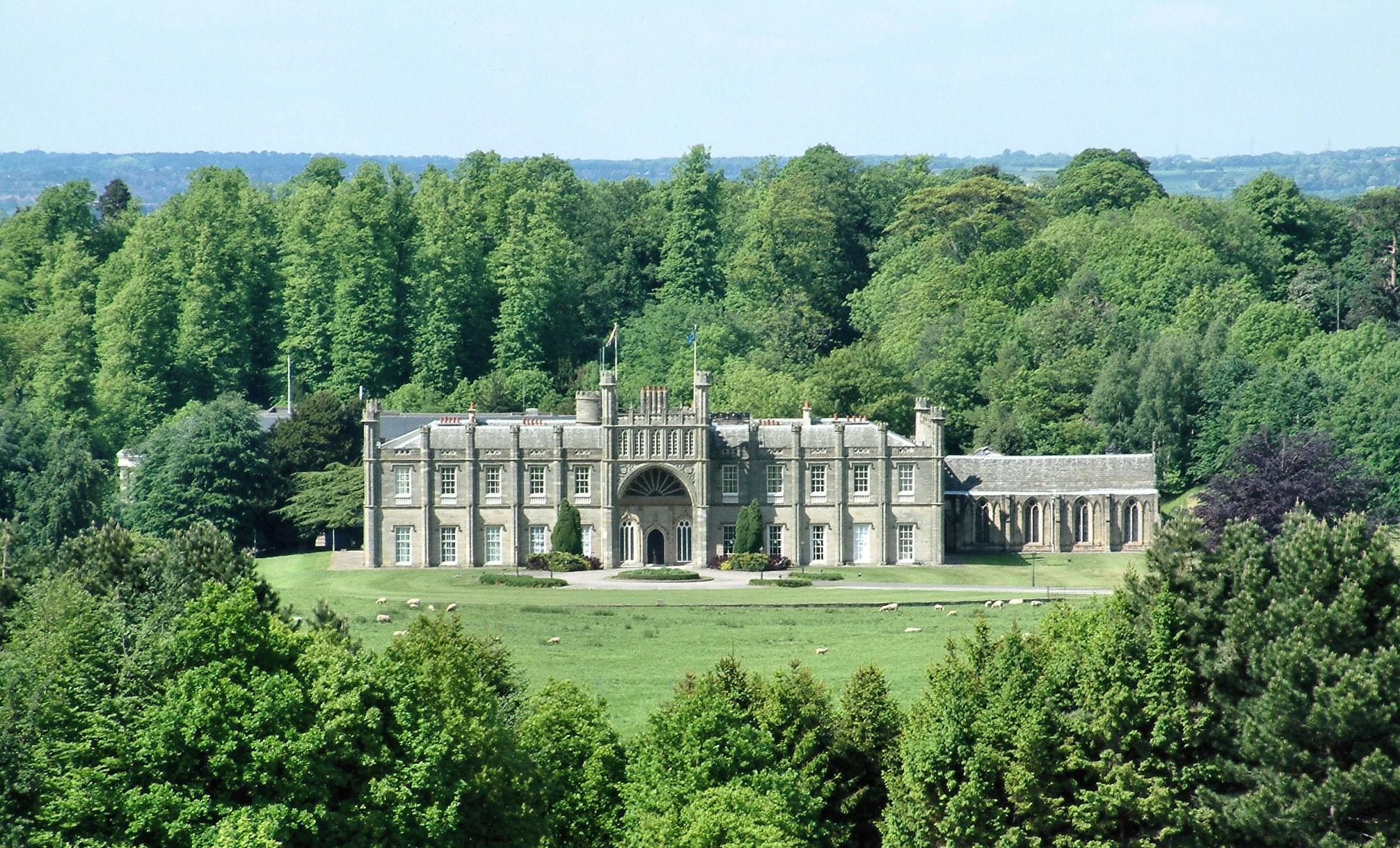
Donington Hall

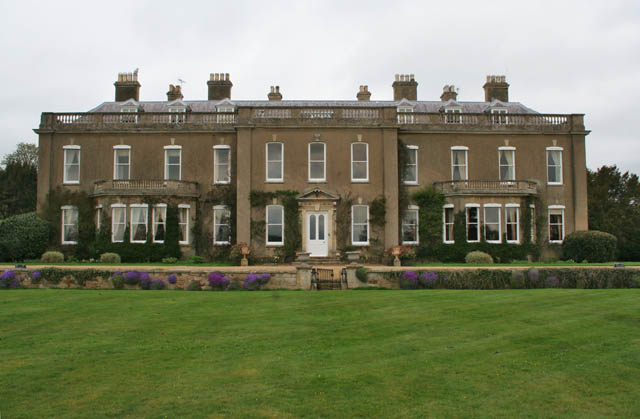
Noseley Hall

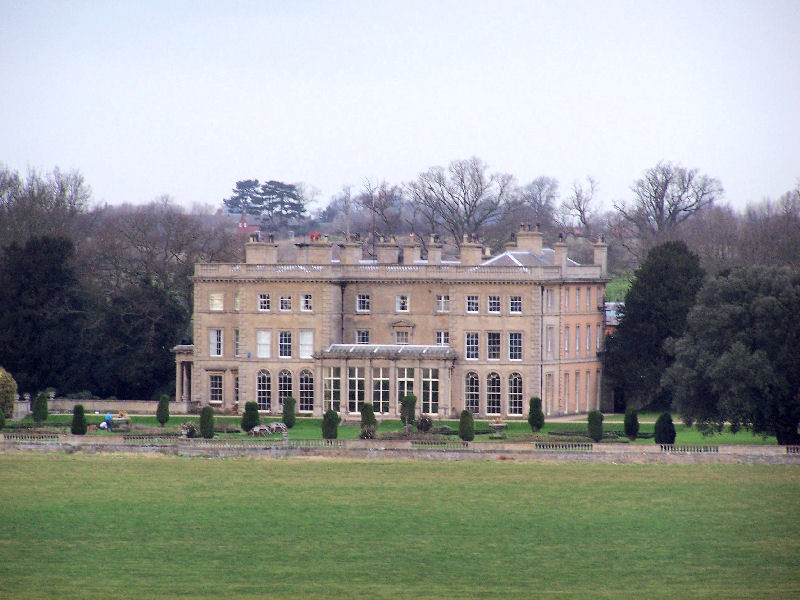
Prestwold Hall

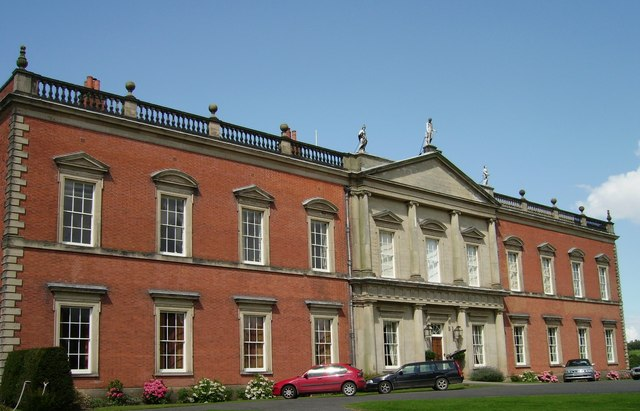
Staunton Harold Hall

=== Lincolnshire ===
- Alford Manor House
- Ashby Hall
- Aubourn Hall
- Ayscoughfee Hall
- Baysgarth House Museum
- Belton House
- Bloxholm Hall (partially demolished)
- Branston Hall
- Brocklesby Hall
- Canwick Hall
- Church Farm Museum
- Cockerington Hall (demolished)
- Coleby Hall
- Cranmer Hall
- Cressy Hall
- Culverthorpe Hall
- Denton Hall (demolished)
- Doddington Hall
- Down Hall, Barrow upon Humber
- Elsham Hall
- Ferndale Manor
- Gainsborough Old Hall
- Glentworth Hall
- Grimsthorpe Castle
- Gunby Hall
- Harlaxton Manor
- Harrington Hall
- Hungerton Hall
- Jew's House
- Kettlethorpe Hall
- Leadenham House
- Manor of Scrivelsby (demolished)
- Marston Hall
- Nocton Hall
- Normanby Hall
- Revesby Abbey
- Riby Grove (demolished)
- Somersby Grange
- Stainfield Hall
- Syston Park (demolished)
- Tattershall Castle
- Thetford
- Wellingore Hall
- Willingham House
- Woolsthorpe Manor

=== Merseyside ===
- Allerton Grove
- Allerton Hall
- Birchley Hall
- Broughton Hall
- Calderstones Mansion House
- Carnatic Hall
- Croxteth Hall
- Dawpool (demolished)
- Eccleston Hall
- Formby Hall
- Gayton Hall
- Ince Blundell Hall
- Irby Hall
- Knowsley Hall
- Liscard Hall (demolished)
- Meols Hall
- Poulton Hall
- Speke Hall
- Storeton Hall
- Thingwall Hall
- Thingwall House
- Thornton Manor
- Thurstaston Hall
- Woolton Hall

=== Norfolk ===
- Anmer Hall
- Barningham Hall
- Baconsthorpe Castle
- Beaupré Hall
- Belcoombe Manor
- Blakeney Guildhall
- Blickling Hall
- Breccles Hall
- Bylaugh Hall
- Castle Rising
- Costessey Hall (demolished)
- Cranmer Hall, Norfolk
- Crimplesham Hall
- Cromer Hall
- Ditchingham Hall
- Earsham Hall
- East Barsham Manor
- Ellingham Hall
- Farfield
- Felbrigg Hall
- Gillingham Hall
- Gissing Hall
- Gresham Castle
- Gunton Hall
- Hales Hall
- Halvergate Hall
- Hanworth Hall
- Heydon Hall
- Holkham Hall
- Home Place, Kelling
- Honingham Hall (demolished)
- Horstead Hall
- Houghton Hall
- How Hill House
- Hoxun Court
- Huntingfield Manor
- Kelling Hall
- Langley Hall
- Lesingham House
- Letton Hall
- Lynford Hall
- Mannington Hall
- Manor Farm, Diss
- Melton Constable Hall
- Merton Hall
- Middleton Towers
- Morley Old Hall
- Narborough Hall
- Narford Hall
- Overstrand Hall
- Oxburgh Hall
- Oxnead Hall
- Raveningham Hall
- Raynham Hall
- Salle Park
- Sandringham House
- Shelton Hall
- Sheringham Hall
- Shropham Hall
- South Acre Hall
- Sprowston Manor
- Tacolneston Hall
- Thornham Manor
- Windham Manor
- Winnold House
- Wolterton Hall
- Wood Farm
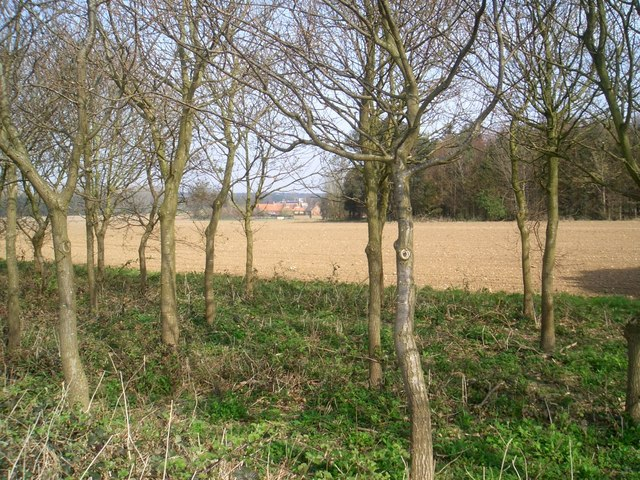
Cranmer Hall

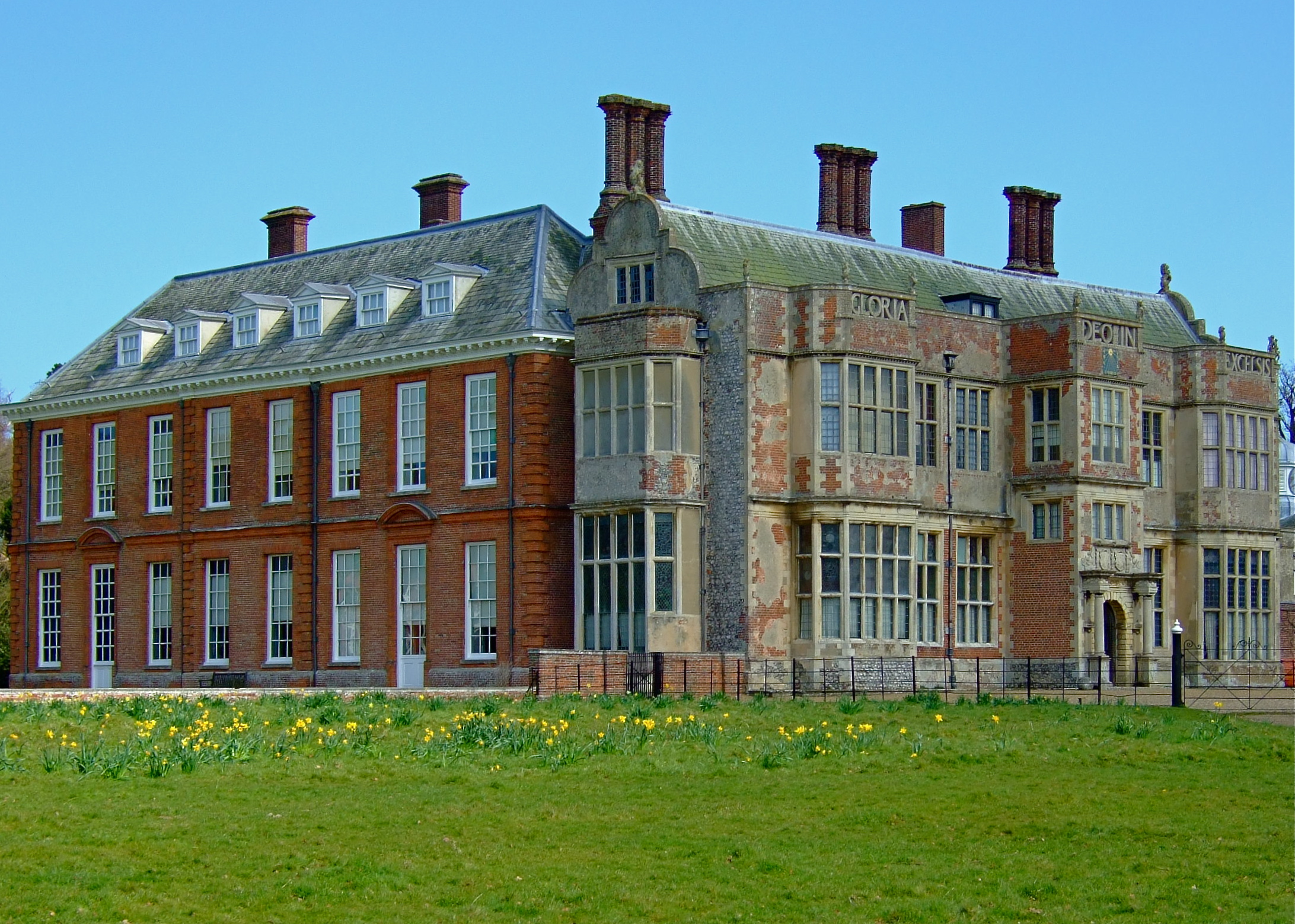
Felbrigg Hall

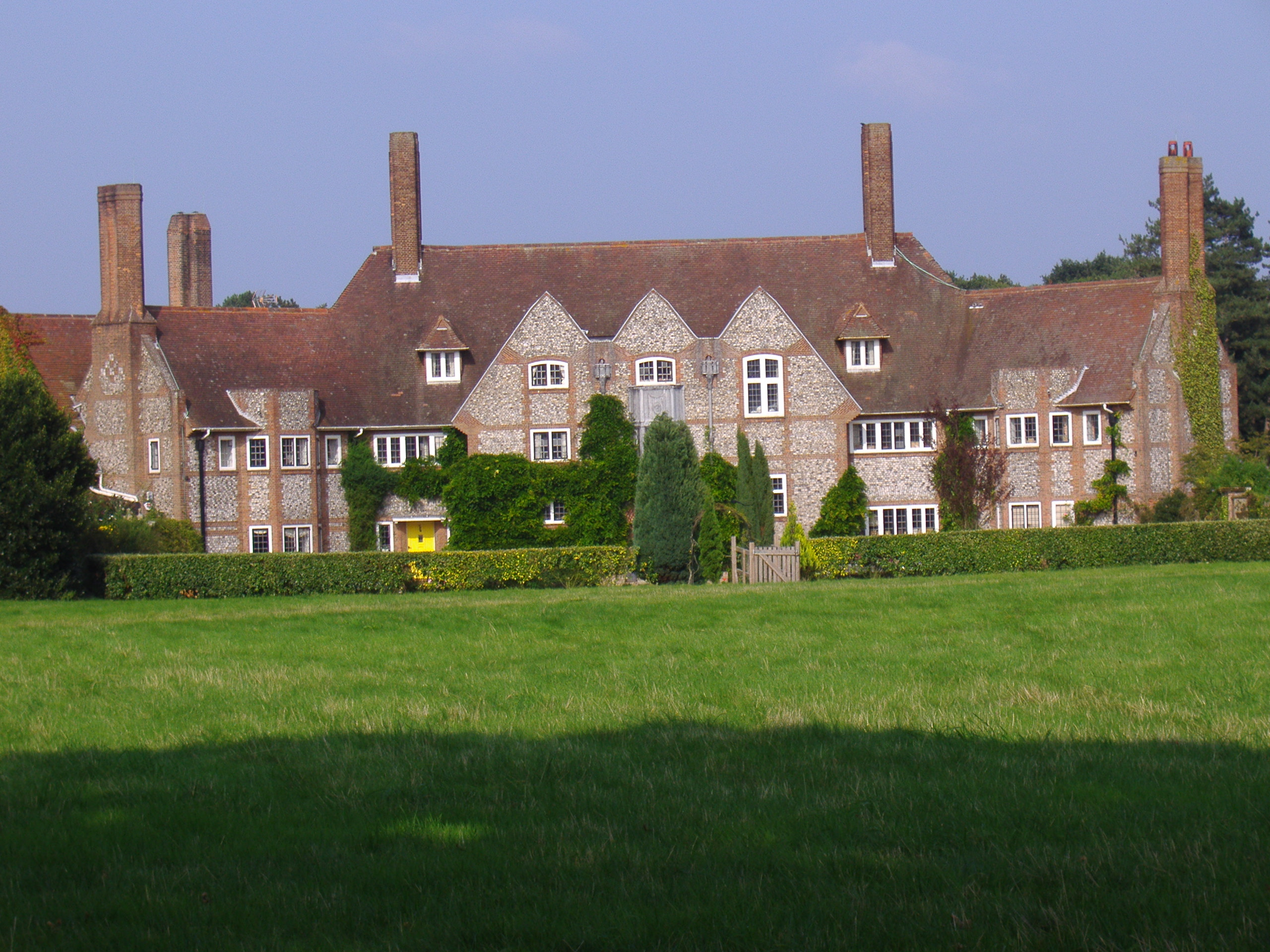
Kelling Hall

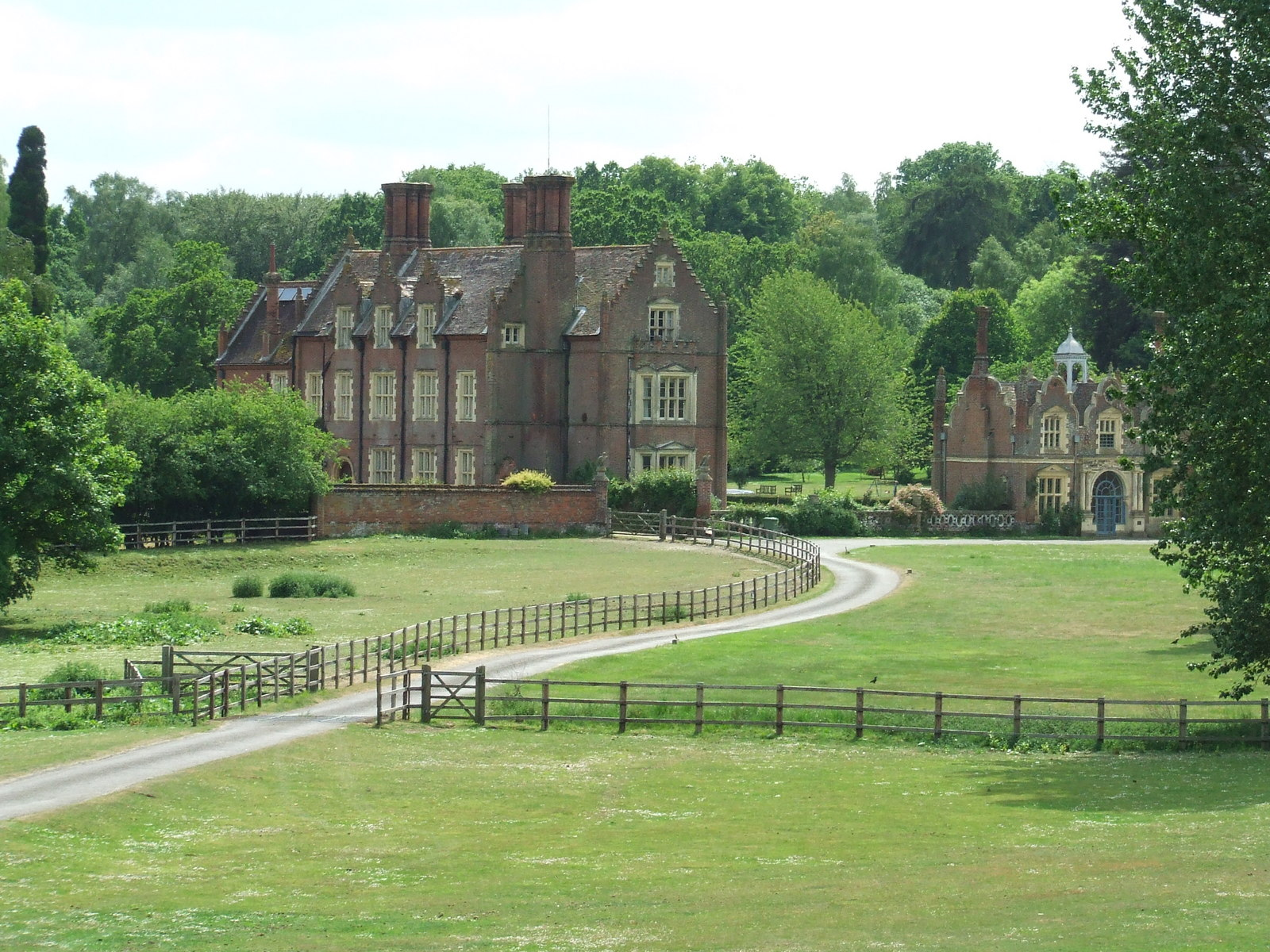
Merton Hall

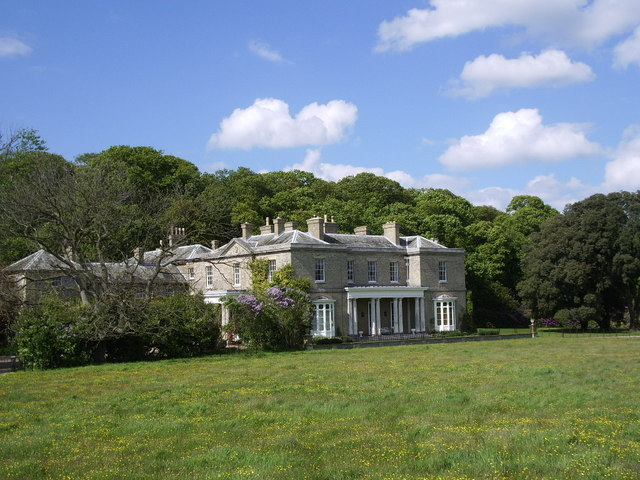
Sheringham Hall

=== Northamptonshire ===
- Althorp House
- Apethorpe Hall
- Arthingworth Manor
- Astrop House
- Astwell Castle
- Aynhoe Park
- Barnwell Manor
- Barton Seagrave
- Beeston Hall
- Biggin Hall
- Blakesley Hall
- Blisworth
- Boughton House
- Burton Latimer Hall
- Canons Ashby House
- Castle Ashby Manor
- Caswell
- Cosgrove
- Cottesbrooke Hall
- Courteenhall
- Cransley Hall
- Crostwight Hall
- Croyland Abbey, Wellingborough
- Deene Park
- Drayton House
- East Carlton Hall
- Easton Neston
- Edgcote
- Eydon Hall
- Finedon Hall
- Flore House
- Gayton Manor House
- Glassthorpe Manor (demolished)
- Great Addington Manor
- Great Oakley Hall
- Horton Hall (demolished)
- Highgate House
- Holdenby House
- Kelmarsh Hall
- Ken Hill (house)
- King's Sutton
- Kirby Hall
- Lamport Hall
- Laxton Hall
- Lilford Hall
- Lyveden New Bield
- Oakleigh House
- Rockingham Castle
- Rushden Hall
- Rushton Hall
- Rushton Triangular Lodge
- Shadwell Park
- Sheringham Park
- Stanwick Hall
- Stoke Park Pavilions
- Sulgrave
- Thenford House
- Waxham Hall
- Wolterton Park
- Worstead House

=== Northumberland ===
- Adderstone Hall
- Alnwick Castle
- Aydon Castle
- Bamburgh Castle
- Barmoor Castle
- Beaufront Castle
- Belford Hall
- Bellister Castle
- Belsay Castle
- Belsay Hall
- Biddlestone Hall
- Blagdon Hall
- Blanchland Abbey
- Blenkinsopp Castle
- Blenkinsop Hall
- Bothal Castle
- Bywell Hall
- Callaly Castle
- Capheaton Hall
- Causey Park House
- Cherryburn
- Chesters (Humshaugh)
- Chillingham Castle
- Chipchase Castle
- Churnsike Lodge
- Clennell Hall
- Close House
- Collingwood House, Morpeth
- Coupland Castle
- Cragside
- Craster Tower
- Dally Castle
- Dilston Castle
- Dissington Hall
- Eglingham Hall
- Ellingham Hall
- Embleton Hall
- Eshott Hall
- Eslington Park
- Featherstone Castle
- Fowberry Tower
- Haughton Castle
- Hethpool House, Kirknewton
- Howick Hall
- Kirkharle Hall
- Kirkley Hall
- Lemmington Hall
- Lilburn Tower
- Linden Hall
- Lindisfarne Castle
- Little Harle Tower
- Marshall Meadows Country House Hotel
- Matfen Hall
- Milbourne Hall
- Mitford Hall
- Mitford Old Manor House
- Netherwitton Hall
- Newbrough Hall
- Nunnykirk Hall
- Ogle Castle
- Otterburn Hall
- Otterburn Tower
- Ponteland Castle
- Seaton Delaval Hall
- Shawdon Hall
- Swarland Old Hall
- Unthank Hall
- Wallington Hall
- Walwick Grange
- Westhall
- Whalton Manor

=== North Yorkshire ===
- Acklam Hall
- Aldby Park
- Allerton Castle
- Aske Hall
- Bedale Hall
- Beningbrough Hall
- Birdsall House
- Bishopthorpe Palace
- Bolton Hall
- Brockfield Hall
- Broughton Hall
- Byram Hall (demolished)
- Carlton Towers
- Castle Howard
- Cliffe Hall
- Cliff House
- Clifton Castle
- Constable Burton Hall
- Crayke Castle
- Crathorne Hall
- Denton Hall, Wharfedale
- Duncombe Park
- Dunsley Hall
- Ebberston Hall
- Eshton Hall
- Farnley Hall
- Forcett Hall
- Fountains Hall
- Friar Garth Farmhouse
- Gilling Castle
- Gisborough Hall
- Grimston Park
- Goldsborough Hall
- Hartforth Hall
- Hauxwell Hall
- Hazlewood Castle
- Heslington Hall
- Hornby Castle
- Hovingham Hall
- Howsham Hall
- Kiplin Hall
- Kirkby Fleetham Hall
- Markenfield Hall
- Marske Hall
- Middlethorpe Hall
- Middlethorpe Manor
- Middleton Lodge
- Monk Fryston Hall
- Moulton Hall
- Mulgrave Castle
- Nappa Hall
- Netherside Hall
- Norton Conyers House
- Newburgh Priory
- Newby Hall
- Newfield Hall
- Nidd Hall
- Nun Appleton Hall
- Nunnington Hall
- Ormesby Hall
- Otterington Hall
- Preston Park
- Raven Hall
- Ribston Hall
- The Ridding
- Ripley Castle
- Rockcliffe Hall
- Rudding Park House
- Rushpool Hall
- Scampston Hall
- Scargill House
- Shandy Hall
- Simonstone Hall
- Sion Hill Hall
- Skelton Castle
- Skelton Hall
- Skipton Castle
- Stockeld Park
- Stockton Hall, York
- Studley Royal House (demolished)
- Sutton Park
- Swinton Park
- Thirkleby Hall (demolished)
- Thornton Watlass Hall
- Wilton Castle
- Wrea Head Hall
- Wykeham Abbey

=== Nottinghamshire ===
- Annesley Hall
- Bestwood Lodge
- Blyth Hall (demolished)
- Bulwell Hall (demolished)
- Bunny Hall
- Clifton Hall, Nottingham
- Colwick Hall
- Clumber House (demolished)
- Felley Priory
- Flintham Hall
- Hermeston Hall
- Grove Hall
- Thoresby Hall
- Hodsock Priory
- Holme Pierrepont Hall
- Lound Hall
- Langford Hall
- Lenton Hall
- Kelham Hall
- Mapperley Hall
- Mr Straw's House
- Newstead Abbey
- Norwood Park
- Nuthall Temple (demolished)
- Ollerton Hall
- Osberton Hall
- Ossington Hall (demolished)
- Ranby House
- Ruddington Hall
- Rufford Abbey
- Serlby
- Shireoaks Hall
- Stanford Hall
- Staunton Hall
- Teversal Manor
- Thoresby Hall
- Thrumpton Hall
- Thurgarton Priory
- Upton Hall
- Welbeck Abbey
- Winkburn Hall
- Winthorpe Hall
- Wiseton Hall (demolished)
- Wiverton Hall
- Wollaton Hall
- Worksop Manor
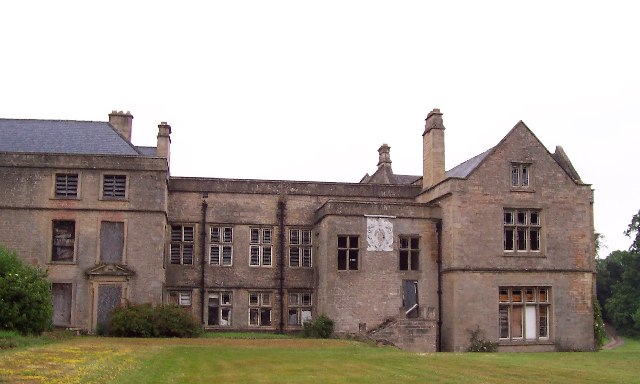
Annesley Hall

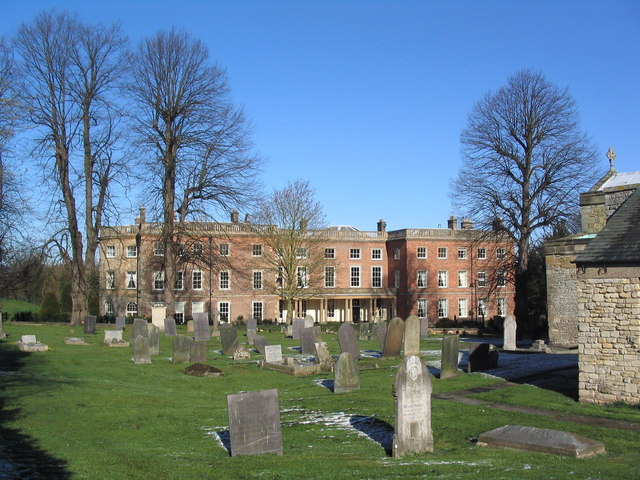
Clifton Hall

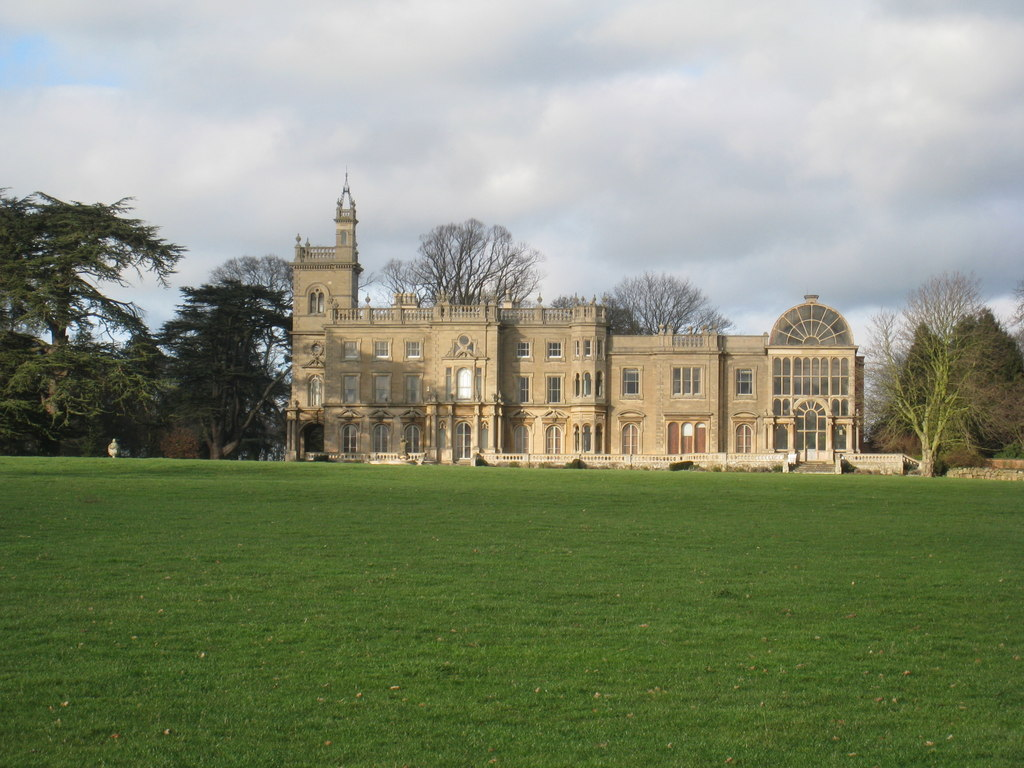
Flintham Hall

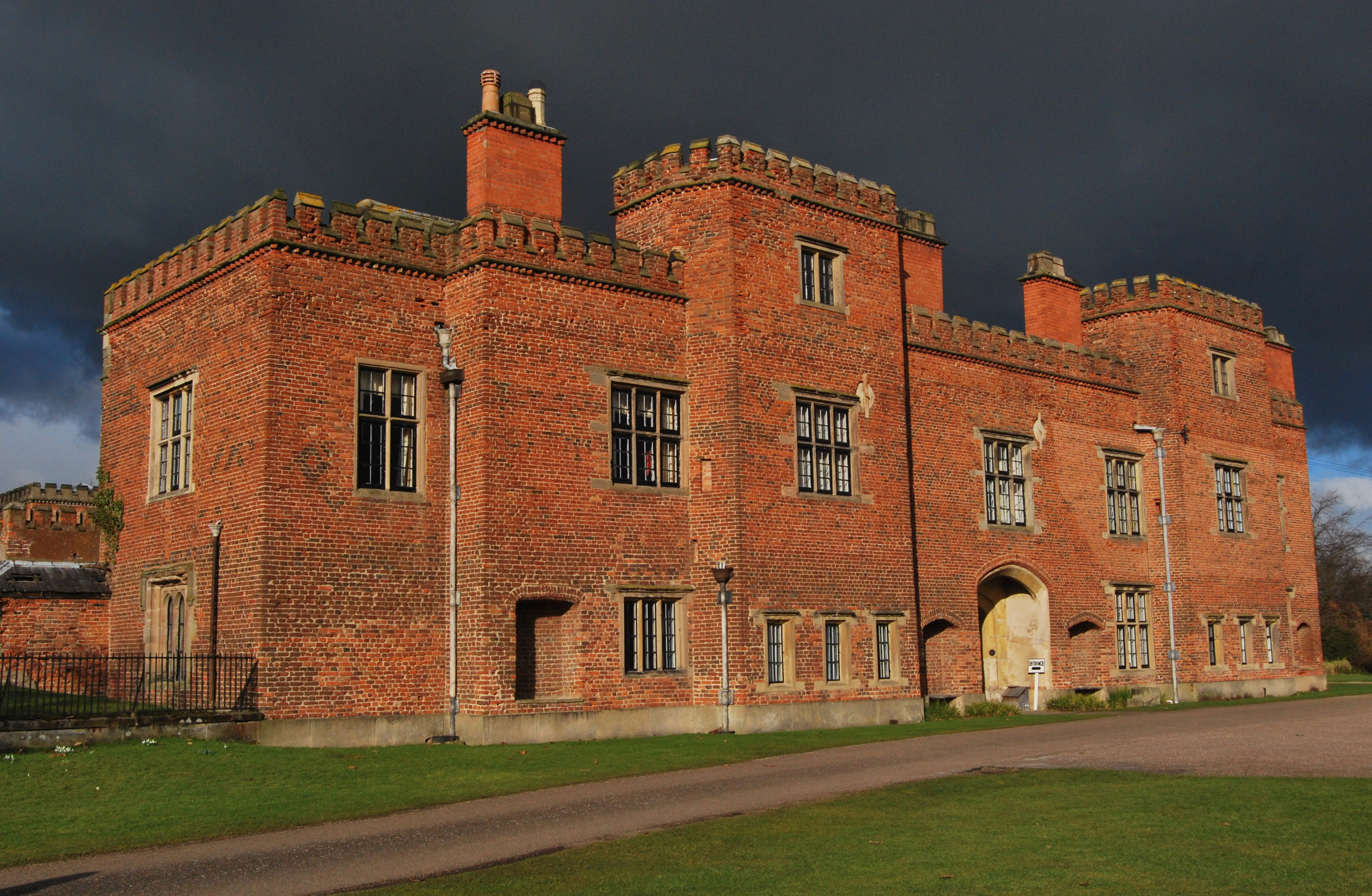
Holme Pierrepont Hall

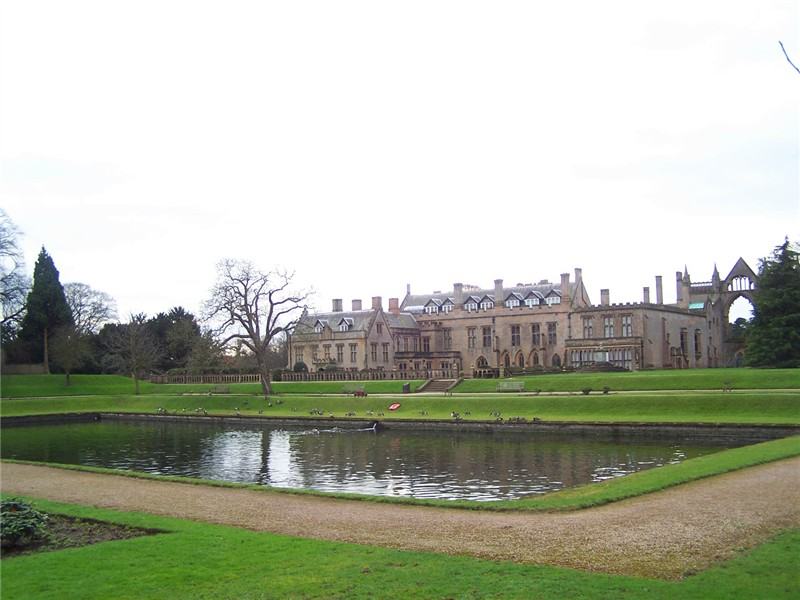
Newstead Abbey

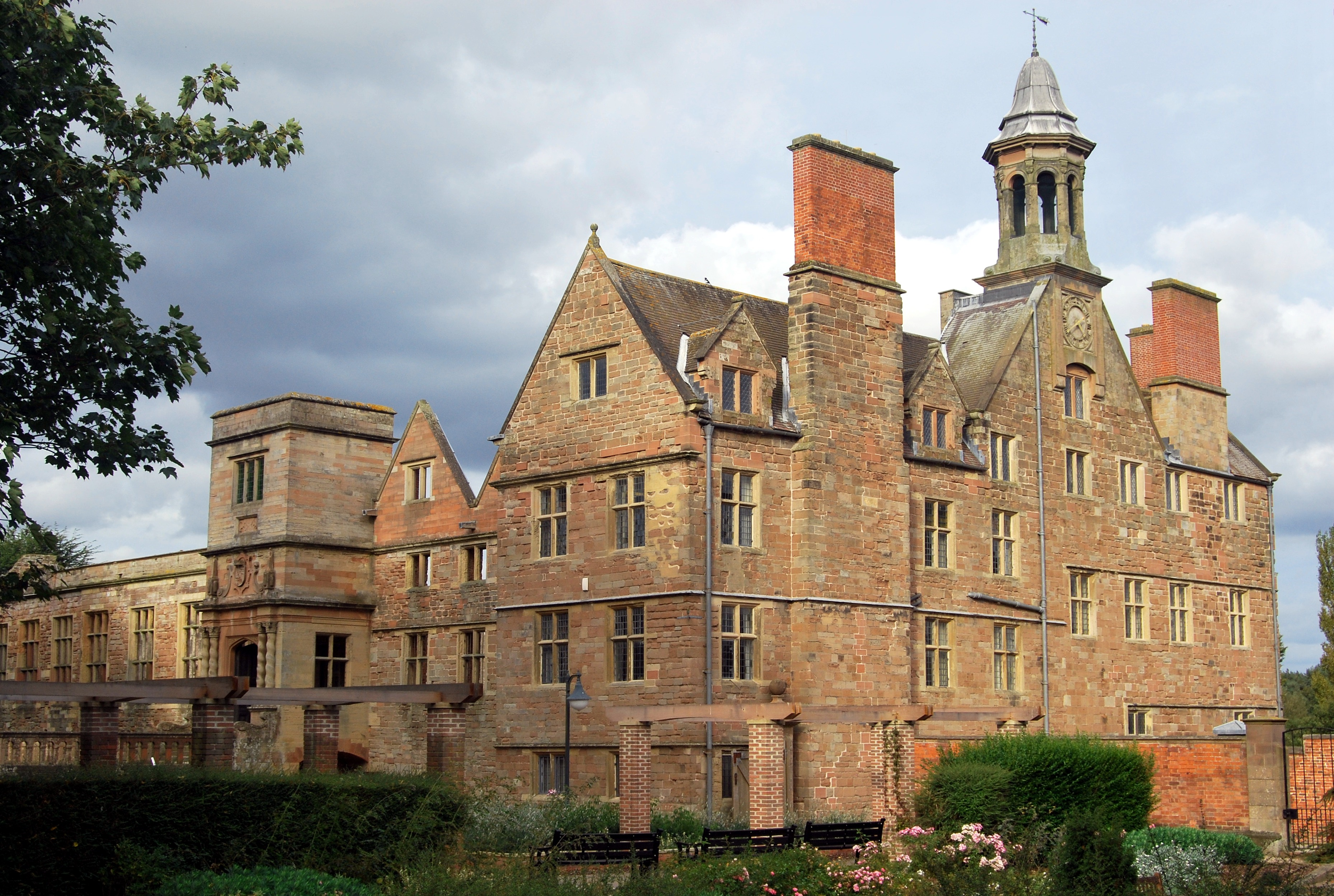
Rufford Abbey

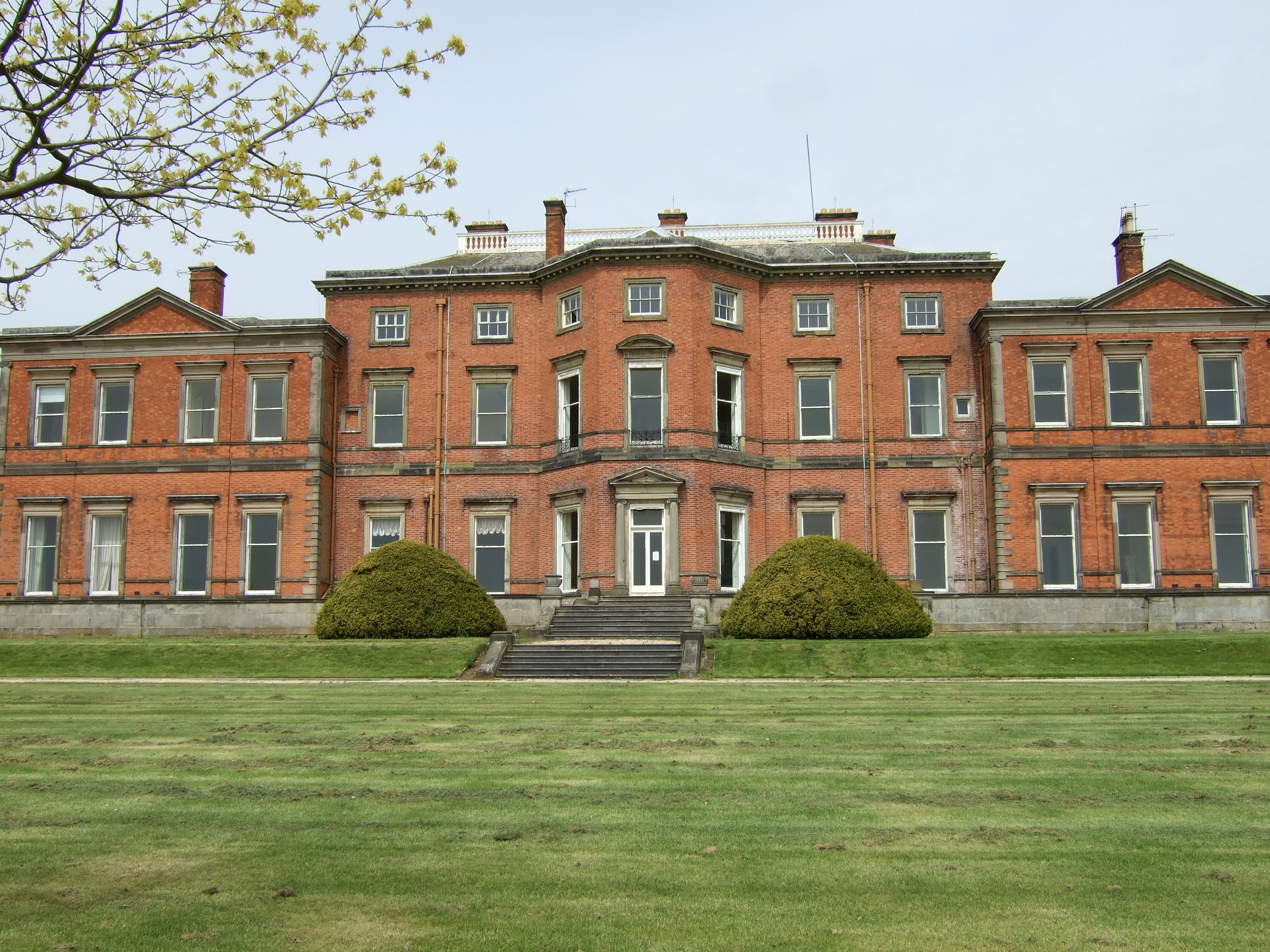
Stanford Hall

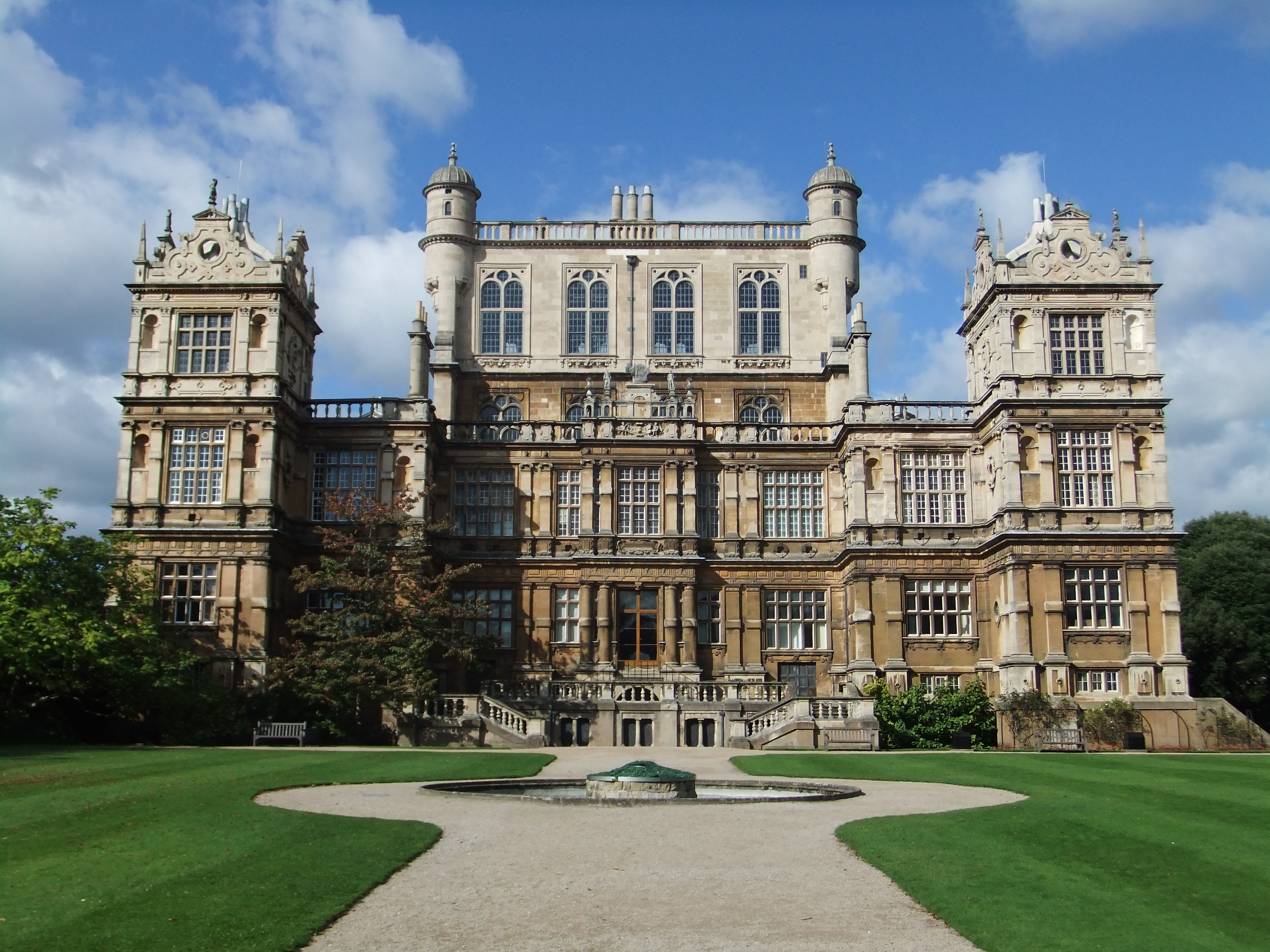
Wollaton Hall

=== Oxfordshire ===
- The Abbey, Sutton Courtenay
- Appleton Manor
- Ardington House
- Ashbury Manor
- Ashdown House
- Ascott Manor
- Asthall Manor
- Balescote Manor
- Beckett Hall
- Blenheim Palace
- Braziers Park
- Brightwell Manor
- Britwell Salome House
- Broughton Castle
- Buckland House
- Burford Priory
- Buscot Park
- Carswell Manor
- Cecilia Castle House
- Charney Manor
- Chastleton House
- Clifton Hampden Manor
- Cogges Manor Farm Museum
- Cokethorpe Park
- Coleshill House (demolished, was in Berkshire)
- Compton Beauchamp House
- Cornbury Park
- Crocker End House
- Crowsley Park
- Culham Manor
- Denman College
- Ditchley
- Edgecote House
- Eynsham Hall
- Friar Park
- Fyfield Manor
- Garsington Manor
- Ginge Manor
- Glympton Park
- Greys Court
- Hardwick House
- Haseley Court
- Headington Hill Hall
- Hendred House
- Henley Park
- Heythrop Park
- Jack Straw's Farmhouse
- Kelmscott Manor
- Kingston Bagpuize House
- Kingston Lisle Park
- Kirklington Park
- Longworth House
- The Manor Studio
- Mapledurham House
- The Mill House
- Milton Manor
- Minster Lovell Hall
- North Aston Hall
- Nuffield Place
- Nuneham House
- Phyllis Court
- Rousham House
- Rycote House
- Sarsden House
- Shirburn Castle
- Shotover Park
- Stanton Harcourt Manor
- Stonor Park
- Sutton Courtenay Manor
- The Vines, Oxford
- Wilcote
- Woodperry House
- Woodstock Palace
- Wroxton Manor
- Wytham Abbey
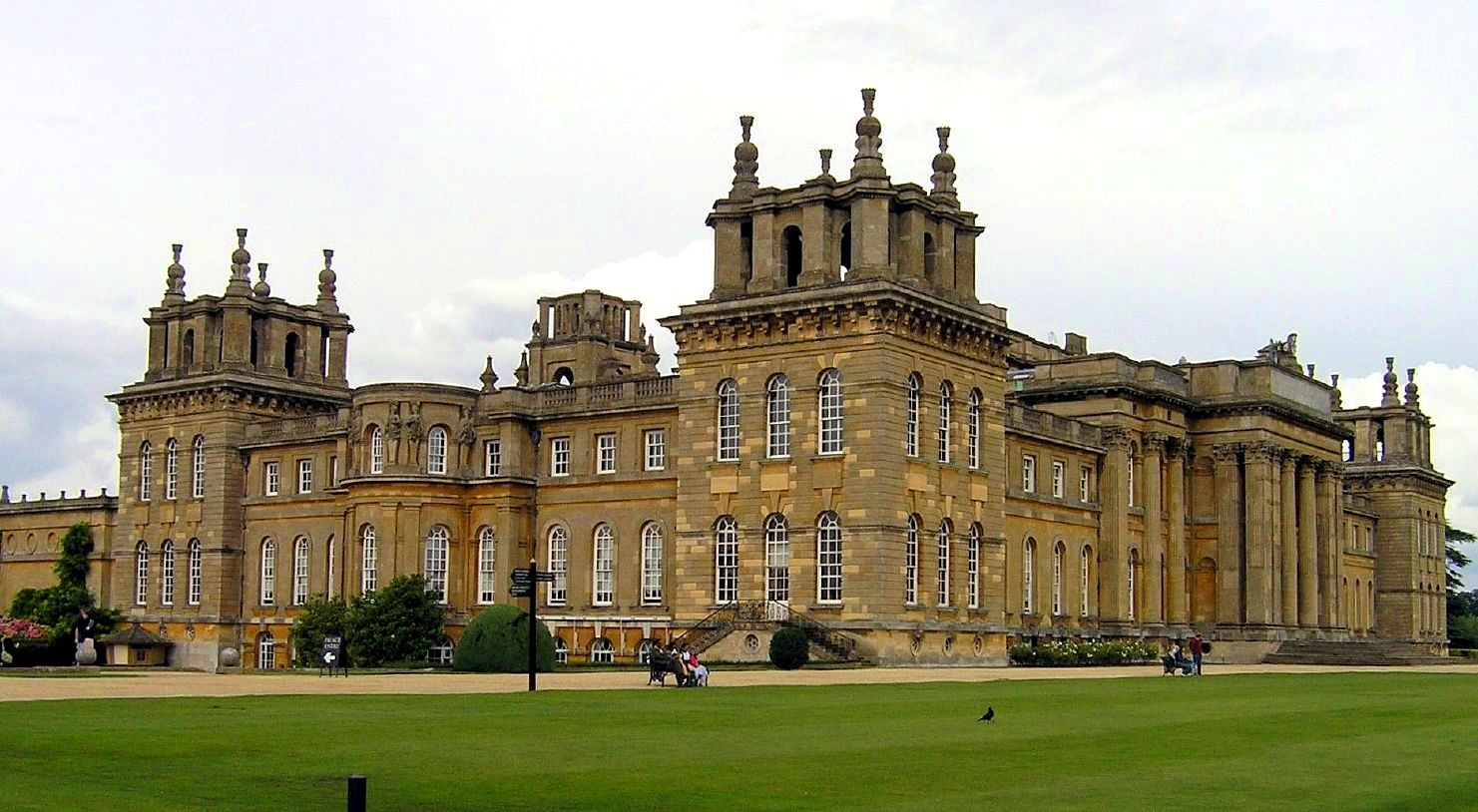
Blenheim Palace

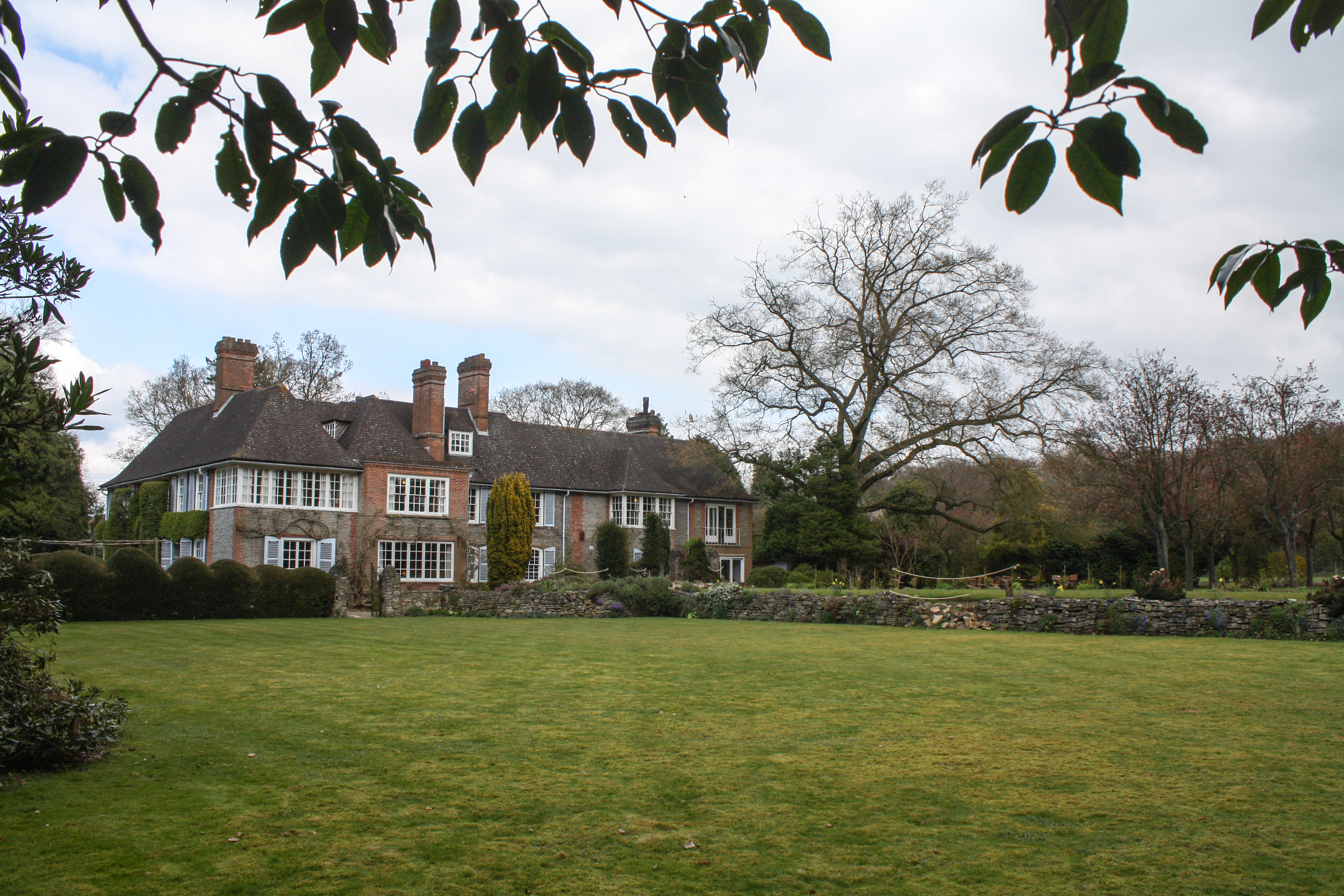
Nuffield Place

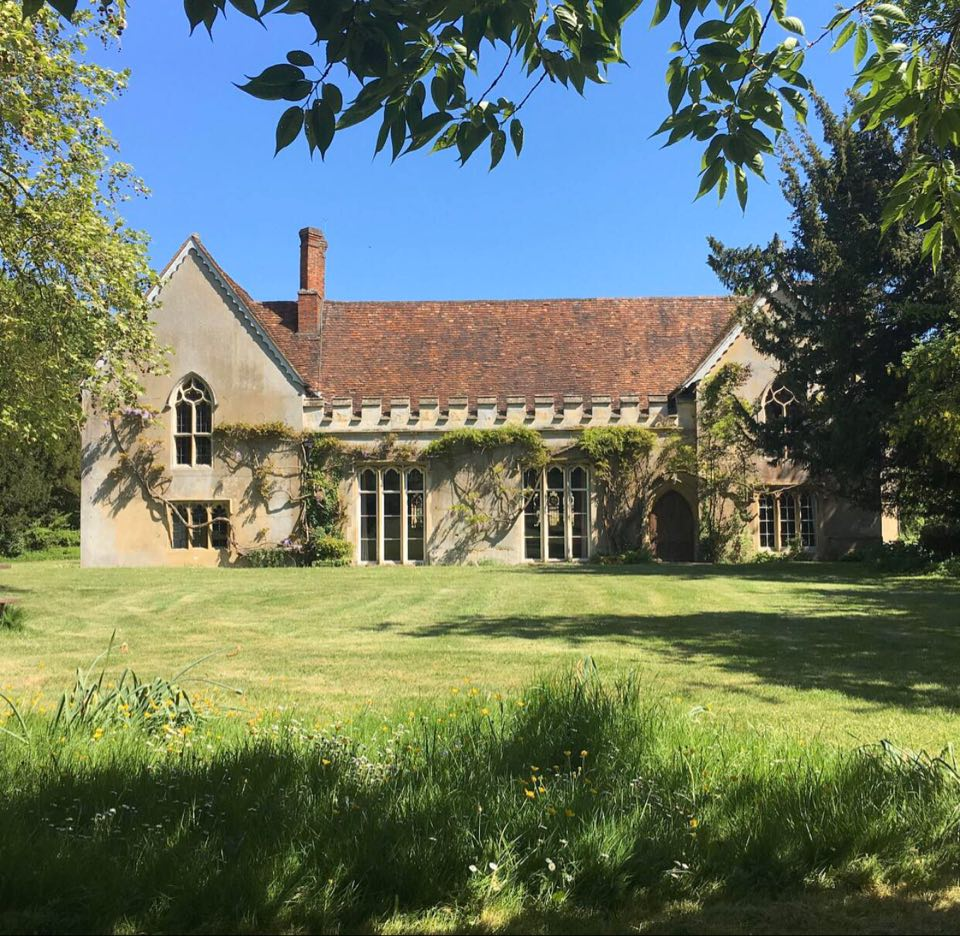
The Abbey, Sutton Courtenay

=== Rutland ===
- Ashwell Hall
- Ayston Hall
- Barnsdale
- Belton Old Hall
- Burley on the Hill House
- Clipsham Hall
- Cottesmore Hall
- Edith Weston Hall (demolished)
- Exton Hall
- Hambleton Old Hall
- Luffenham Hall
- Lyddington Bede House
- Lyndon Hall, Rutland
- Lyndon Top Hall
- Manton Old Hall
- Market Overton Hall
- Morcott Manor
- Normanton Hall (demolished)
- Preston Manor
- Ryhall Hall
- Seaton Manor
- South Luffenham Hall
- Stocken Hall
- Tickencote Hall
- Tixover Hall
- Tolethorpe Hall
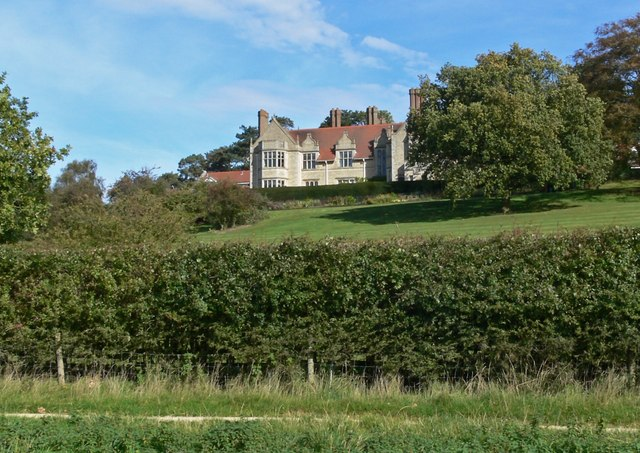
Barnsdale

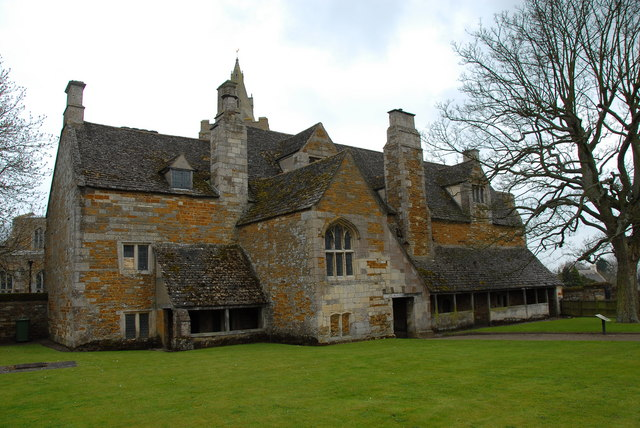
Lyddington Bede House

=== Shropshire ===
- Acton Burnell Castle
- Acton Reynald Hall
- Acton Round Hall
- Adcote
- Adderley Hall (demolished)
- Aldenham Park
- Apley Hall
- Aston Hall
- Aston Eyre Hall
- Attingham Park
- Badger Hall (largely demolished)
- Bedstone Court
- Benthall Hall
- Bitterley Court
- Boscobel House
- Brand Hall
- Brogyntyn
- Broncroft Castle
- Buntingsdale Hall
- Burford House
- Castle Lodge, Ludlow
- Chetwynd Hall (demolished)
- Cloverley Hall
- Condover Hall
- Coton Hall
- Cound Hall
- Cronkhill
- Davenport House
- Downton Hall
- Dudmaston Hall
- Ferney Hall
- Halston Hall
- Hampton Hall
- Haughton Hall
- Hawkstone Hall
- Henley Hall
- High Ercall Hall
- Hodnet Hall
- Kinlet Hall
- Leighton Hall
- Lilleshall Hall
- Longford Hall
- Longner Hall
- Longnor Hall
- Loton Park
- Ludford House
- Madeley Court
- Mawley Hall
- Millichope Park
- Minsterley Hall
- Moreton Corbet Castle
- Morville Hall
- Netley Hall
- Oakly Park
- Pell Wall Hall
- Peplow Hall
- Pitchford Hall
- Plowden Hall
- Preston Hall, Preston Brockhurst
- Quatford Castle
- Rowton Castle
- Sansaw
- Shavington Hall, Adderley (demolished)
- Shavington Hall, Shavington cum Gresty
- Shelvock Manor
- Shipton Hall
- Sild Hall
- Soulton Hall
- Stanley Hall
- Stanmore Hall
- Stokesay Castle
- Stokesay Court
- Sunnycroft
- The Mount, Shrewsbury
- Tong Castle
- Upton Cressett Hall
- Walcot Hall
- Whitton Hall
- Wilderhope Manor
- Willey Hall
- Woodcote Hall

=== Somerset ===
- The Abbey, Beckington
- The Abbey, Charlton Adam
- The Abbey, Ditcheat
- Abbotsfield, Wiveliscombe
- Alfoxton House
- Ammerdown House, Kilmersdon
- Ashcombe House
- Ashton Court
- Ashwick Court
- Ashwick House (near Dulverton)
- Babington House
- Banwell Castle
- Barford Park
- Barrington Court
- Barton Grange, Corfe
- Barwick Park
- Bathealton Court
- Beckington Castle
- Blackmoor Farmhouse, Cannington
- Bratton Court
- Brympton d'Evercy
- Burton Pynsent House
- Camerton Court
- Cannington Court
- Chapel Cleeve Manor
- Charlton House, Wraxall
- Clapton Court
- Claverton Manor
- Clevedon Court
- Coker Court
- Combe Hay Manor
- Combe Sydenham
- Cothay Manor
- Cothelstone Manor
- Court House, East Quantoxhead
- Cricket St Thomas
- Crowe Hall
- Dillington House
- Dinder House
- Dunster Castle
- Earnshill House
- East Lambrook Manor
- Enmore Castle
- Fairfield House, Bath
- Farleigh House
- Farleigh Hungerford Castle
- Fyne Court
- Gatcombe
- Gaulden Manor
- Gothelney Hall
- Gournay Court
- Greenham Barton
- Gurney Manor
- Hadspen house and garden
- Halsway Manor
- Halswell House
- Hatch Court
- Hestercombe House
- Hinton House
- Horsington House
- Hymerford House
- Kelston Park
- King John's Hunting Lodge, Axbridge
- Kingweston House
- Leigh Court
- Lions House, Bridgwater
- Lytes Cary
- Manor House, West Coker
- Marshal Wade's House
- Marston Bigot
- Maunsel House
- Mells Manor
- Midelney Manor
- Midford Castle
- Montacute House
- Nailsea Court
- Naish Priory
- Nettlecombe Court
- Newton Park
- Newton Surmaville
- North Cadbury Court
- Nynehead Court
- The Old Manor, Croscombe
- Orchardleigh Estate
- Orchard Wyndham
- Over Langford Manor
- Petherton Park
- Pightley Manor
- Pixton Park
- Poundisford Park
- Prior Park
- Quantock Lodge
- Ralph Allen's Town House, Bath
- Robin Hood's Hut
- Sandhill Park
- Saltford Manor House
- Seymours Court Farmhouse, Beckington
- Shanks House
- Shapwick Manor
- Shockerwick House
- Simonsbath House
- Southill House, Cranmore
- St Audries Park
- St Catherine's Court
- Stoke sub Hamdon Priory
- Ston Easton Park
- Sutton Court
- Tintinhull Court
- Tone Dale House
- Treasurer's House
- The Tribunal, Glastonbury
- Tudor House, Langport
- Tyntesfield
- Ven House
- Walton Castle
- Wayford Manor House
- Westcombe House
- Whitestaunton Manor
- Widcombe Manor House
- Wigborough Manor House
- Woodspring Priory
- Woolston Manor
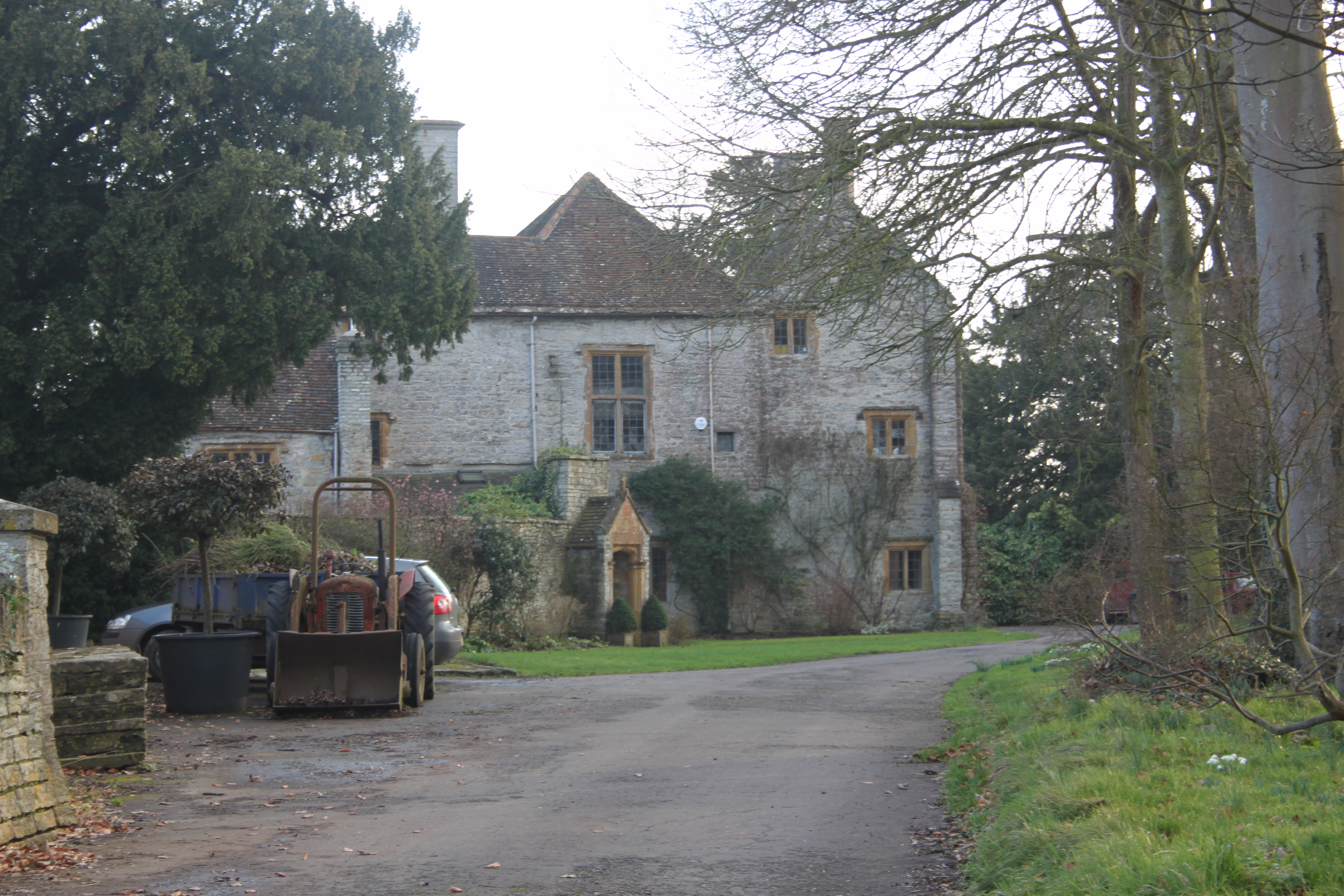
The Abbey, Charlton Adam

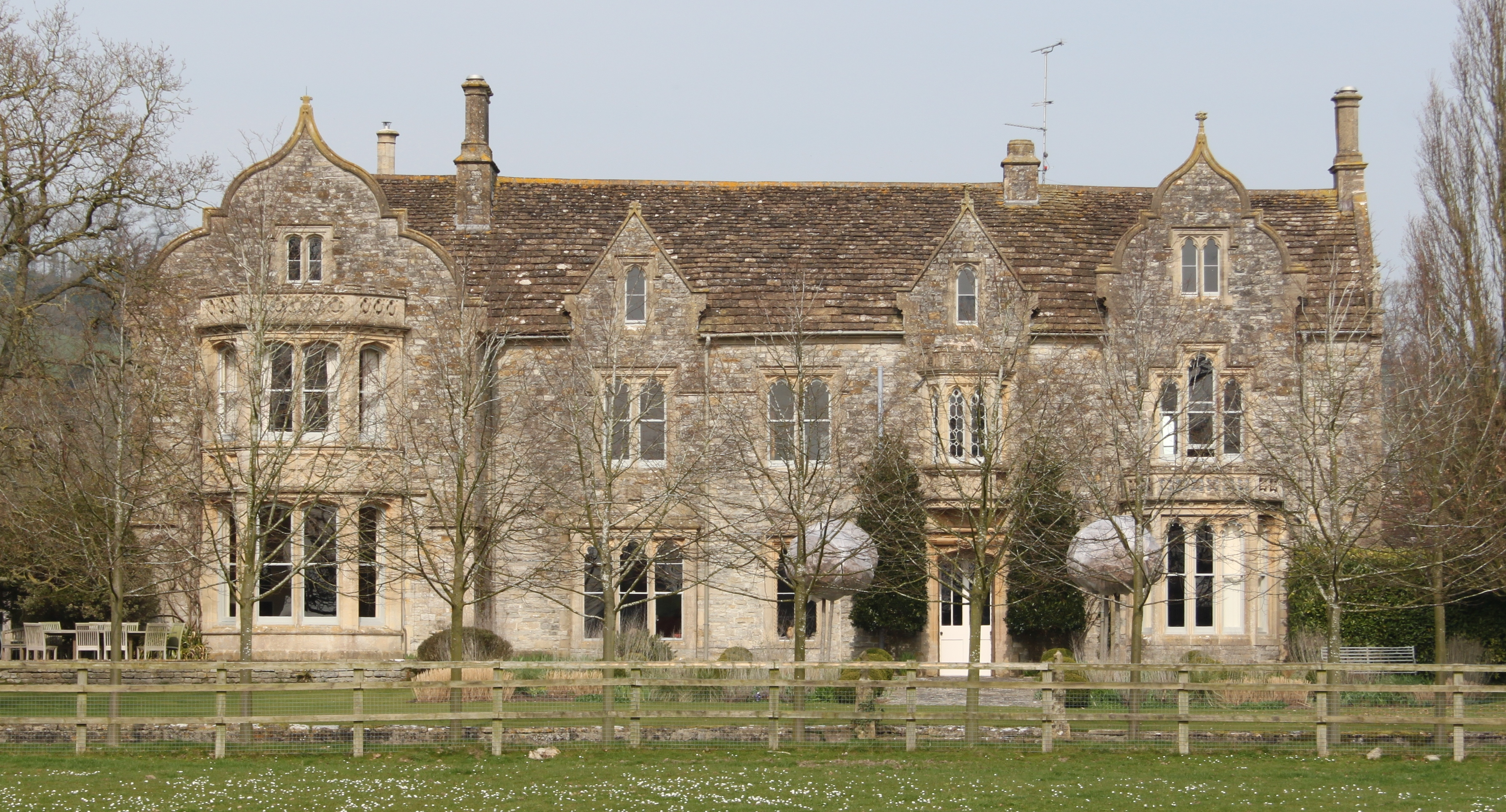
The Abbey, Ditcheat

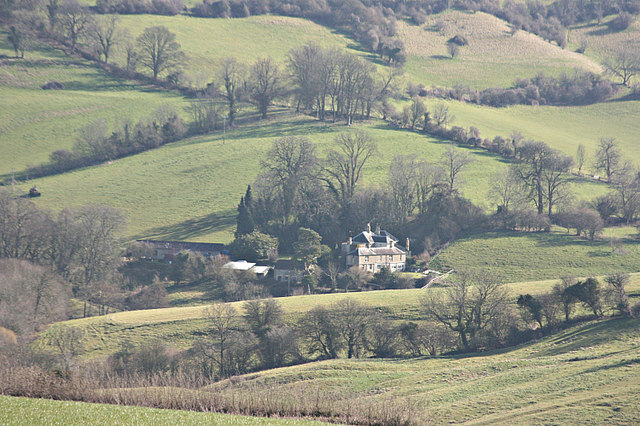
Ashcombe House, Somerset

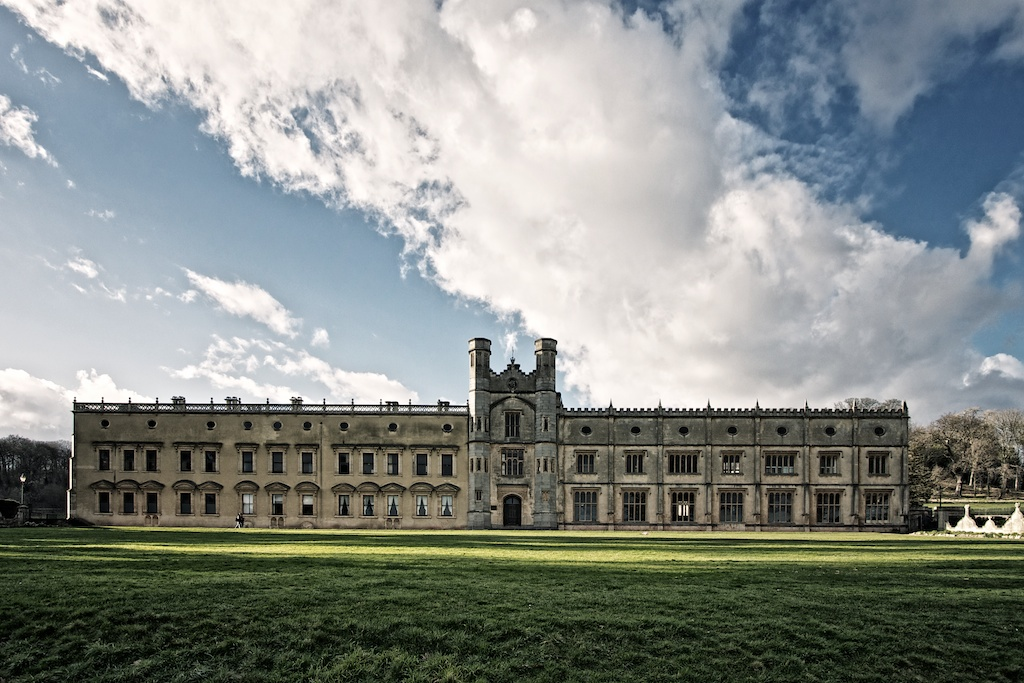
Ashton Court

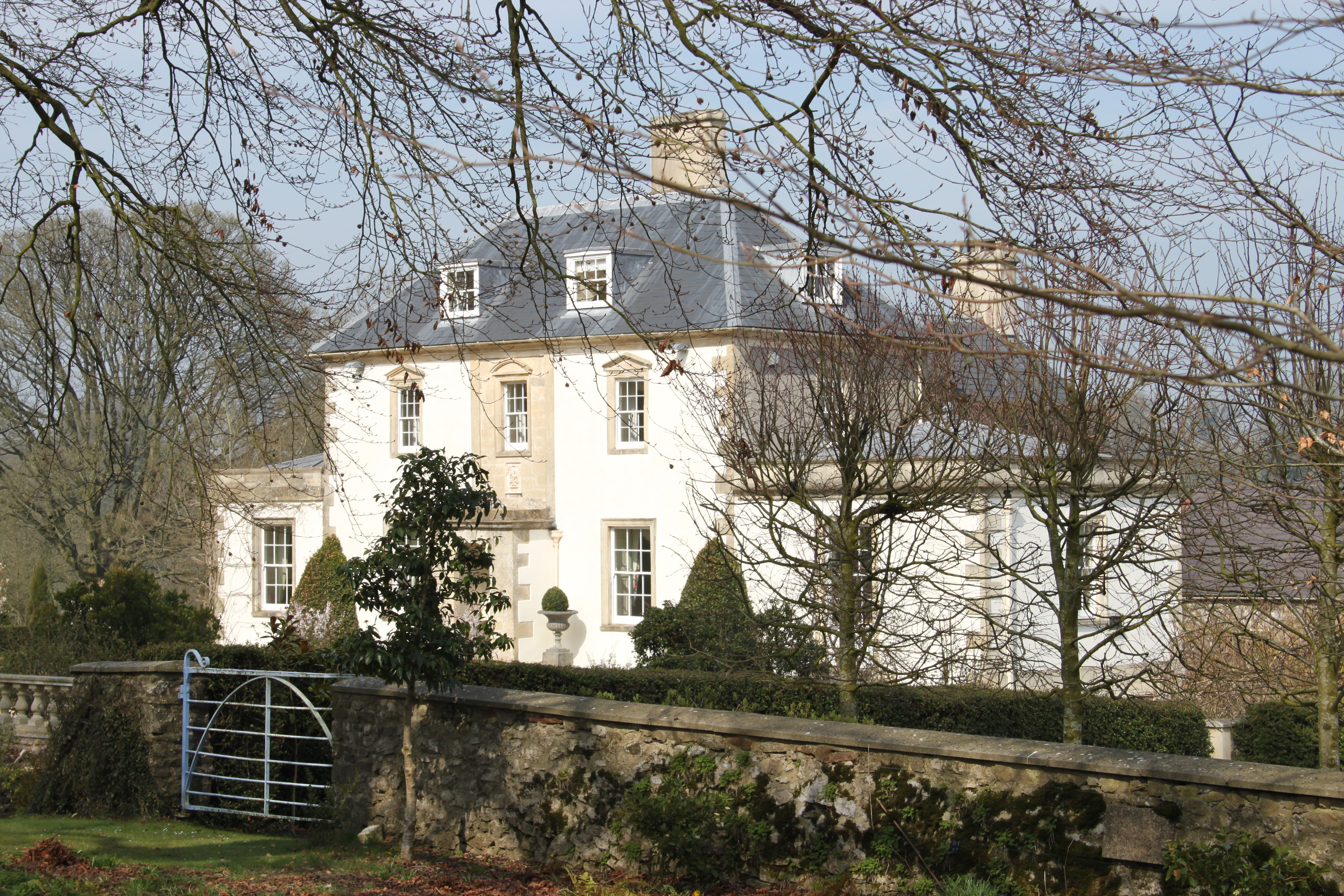
Ashwick Court

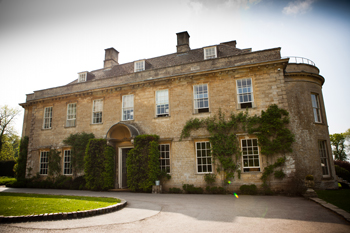
Babington House

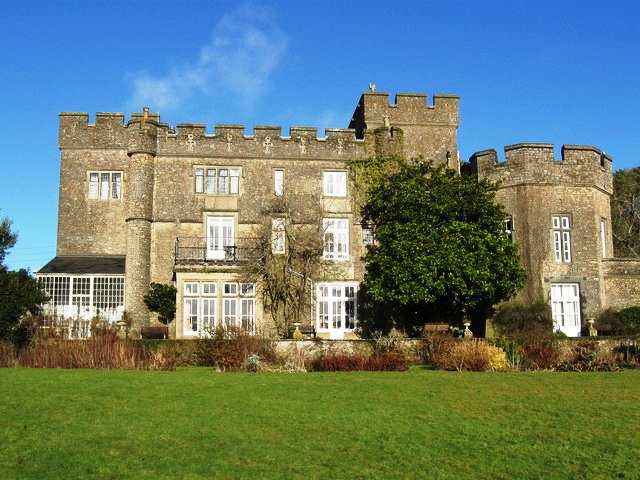
Banwell Castle

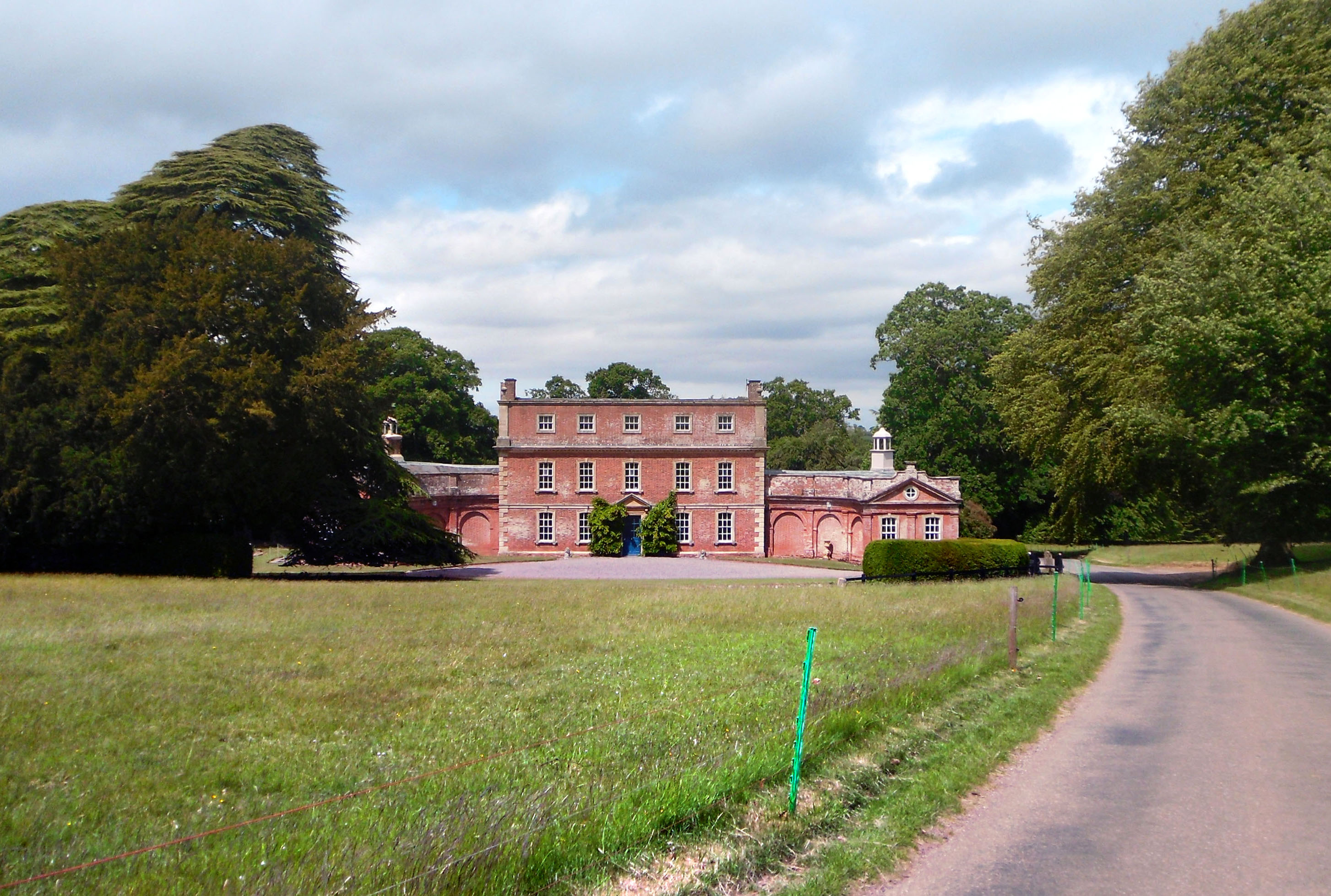
Barford Park

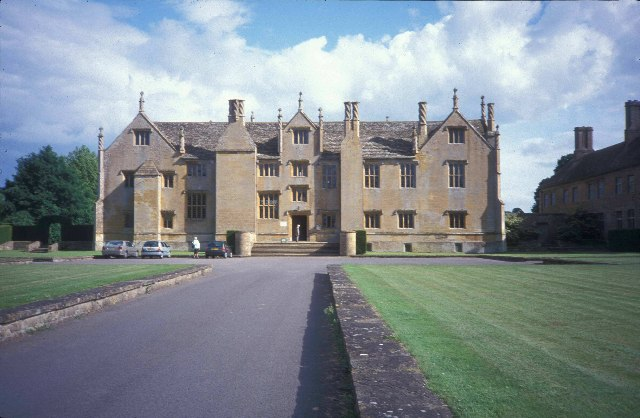
Barrington Court

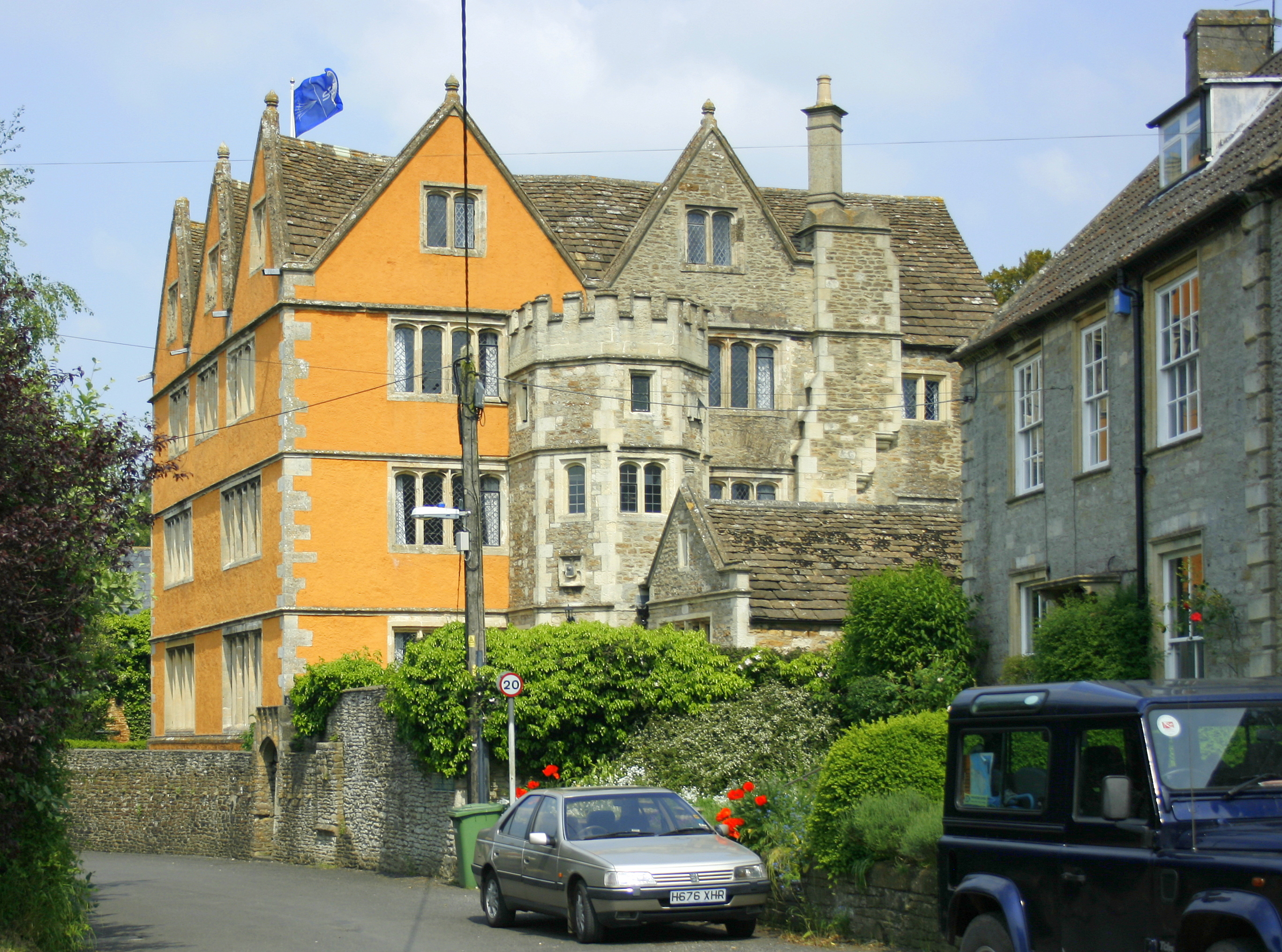
Beckington Castle

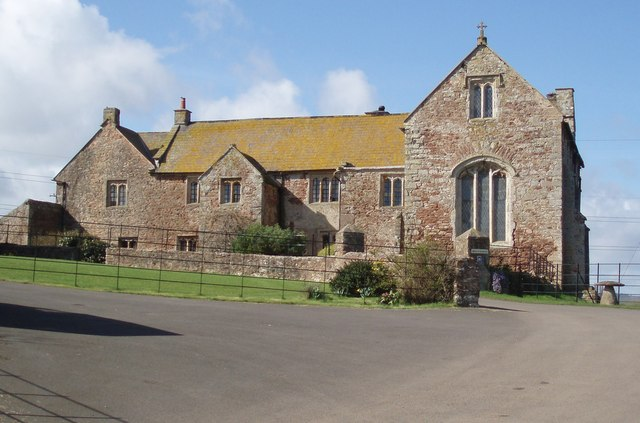
Blackmoor Farmhouse, Cannington

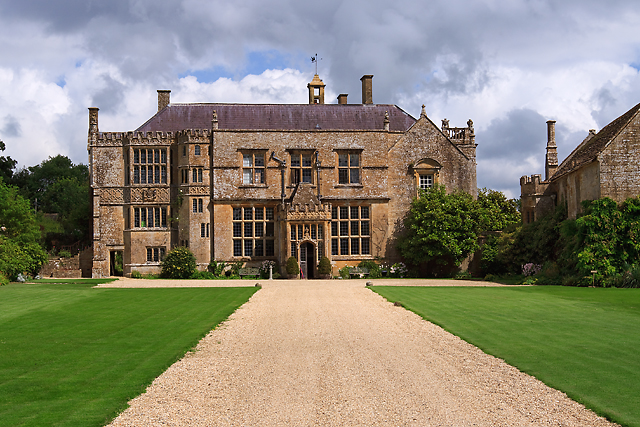
Brympton d'Evercy

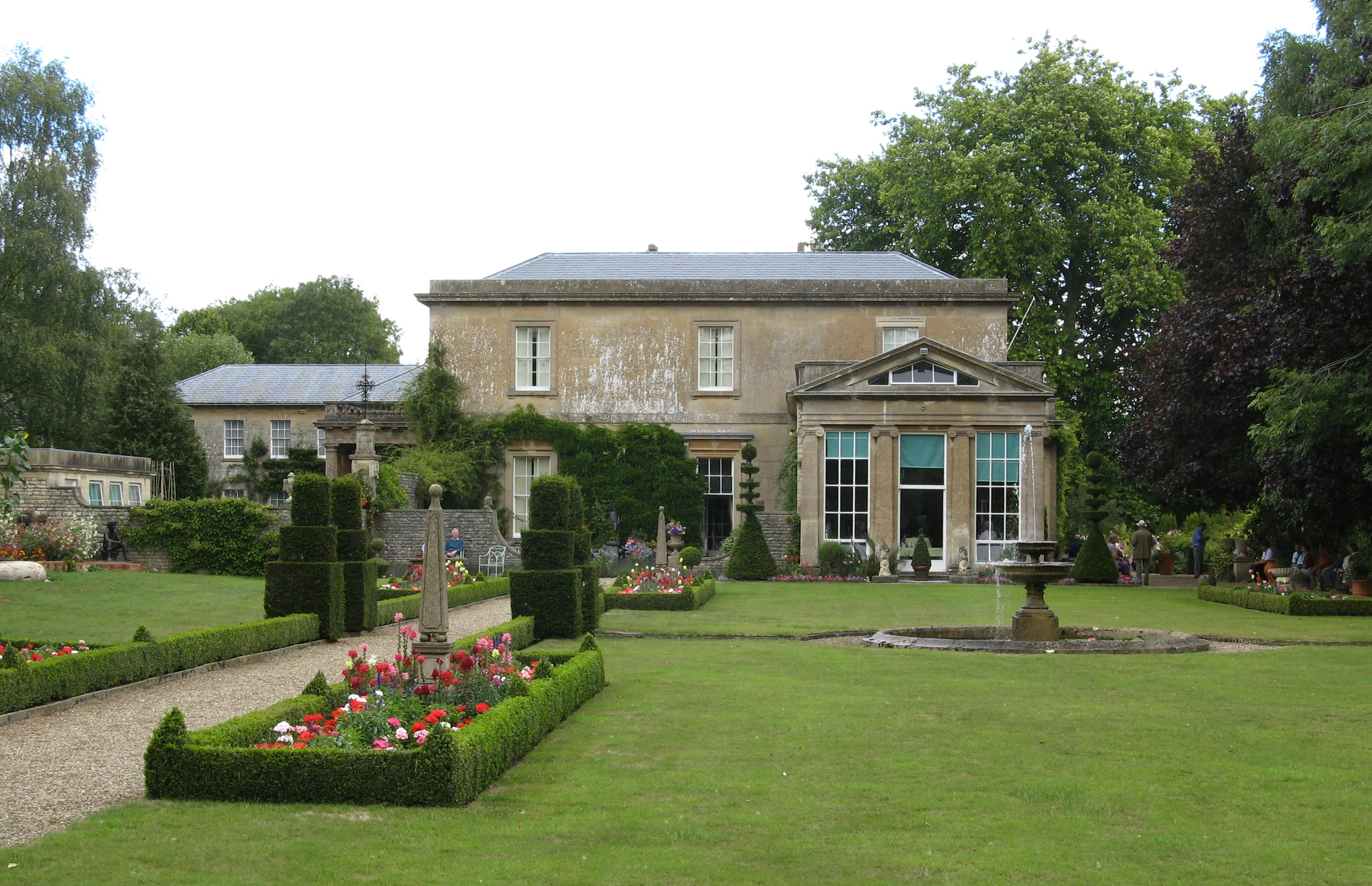
Camerton Court

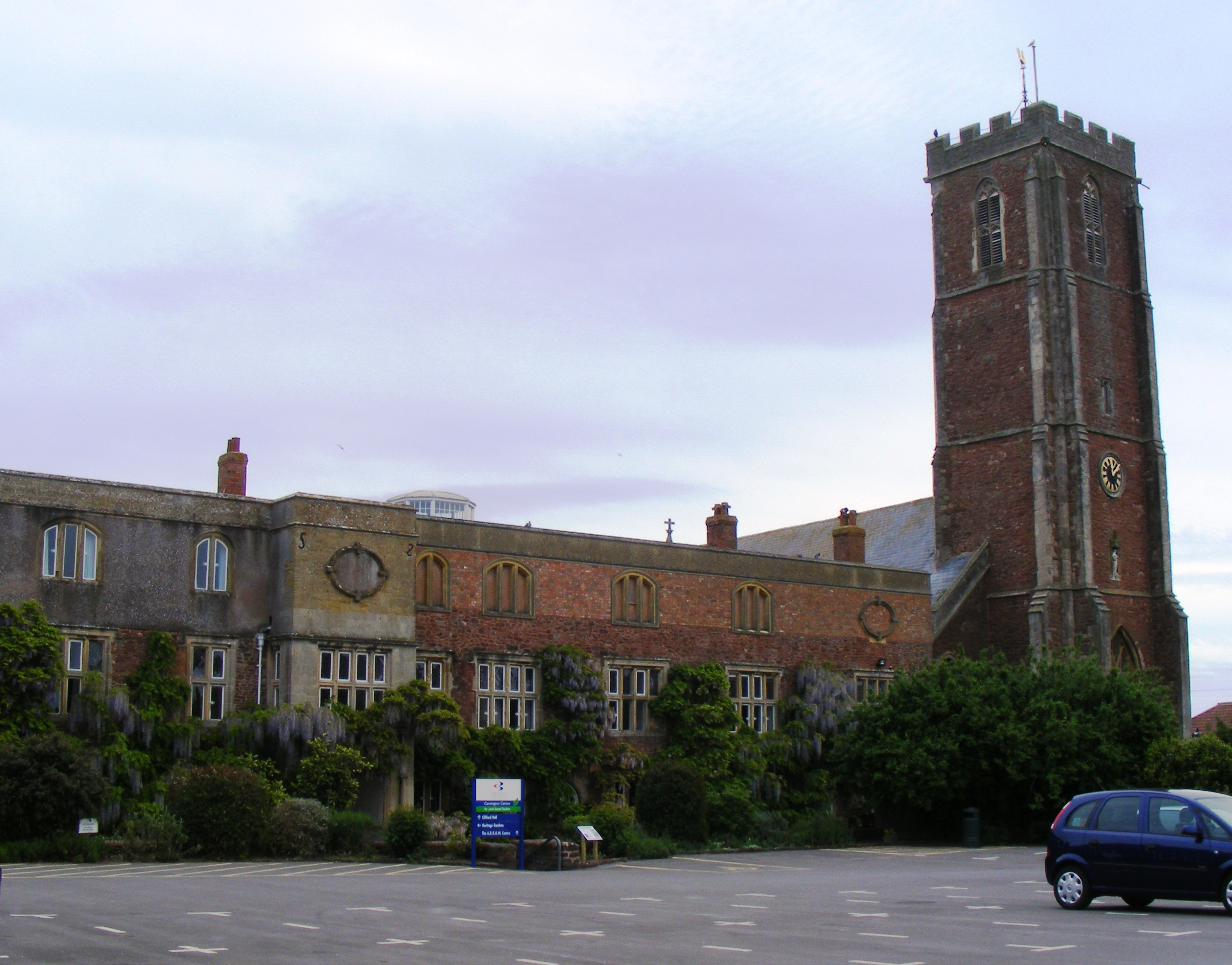
Cannington Court

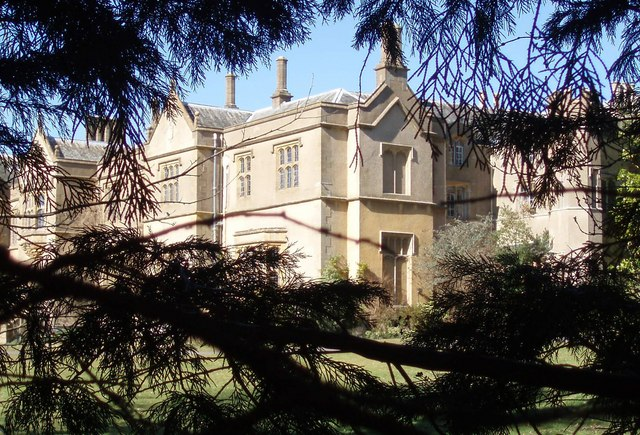
Chapel Cleeve Manor

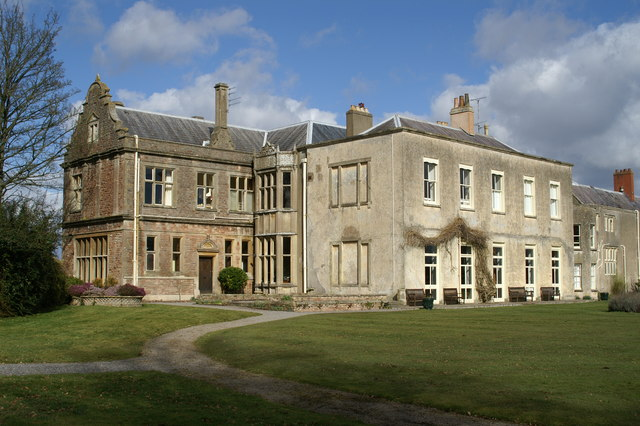
Charlton House, Wraxall

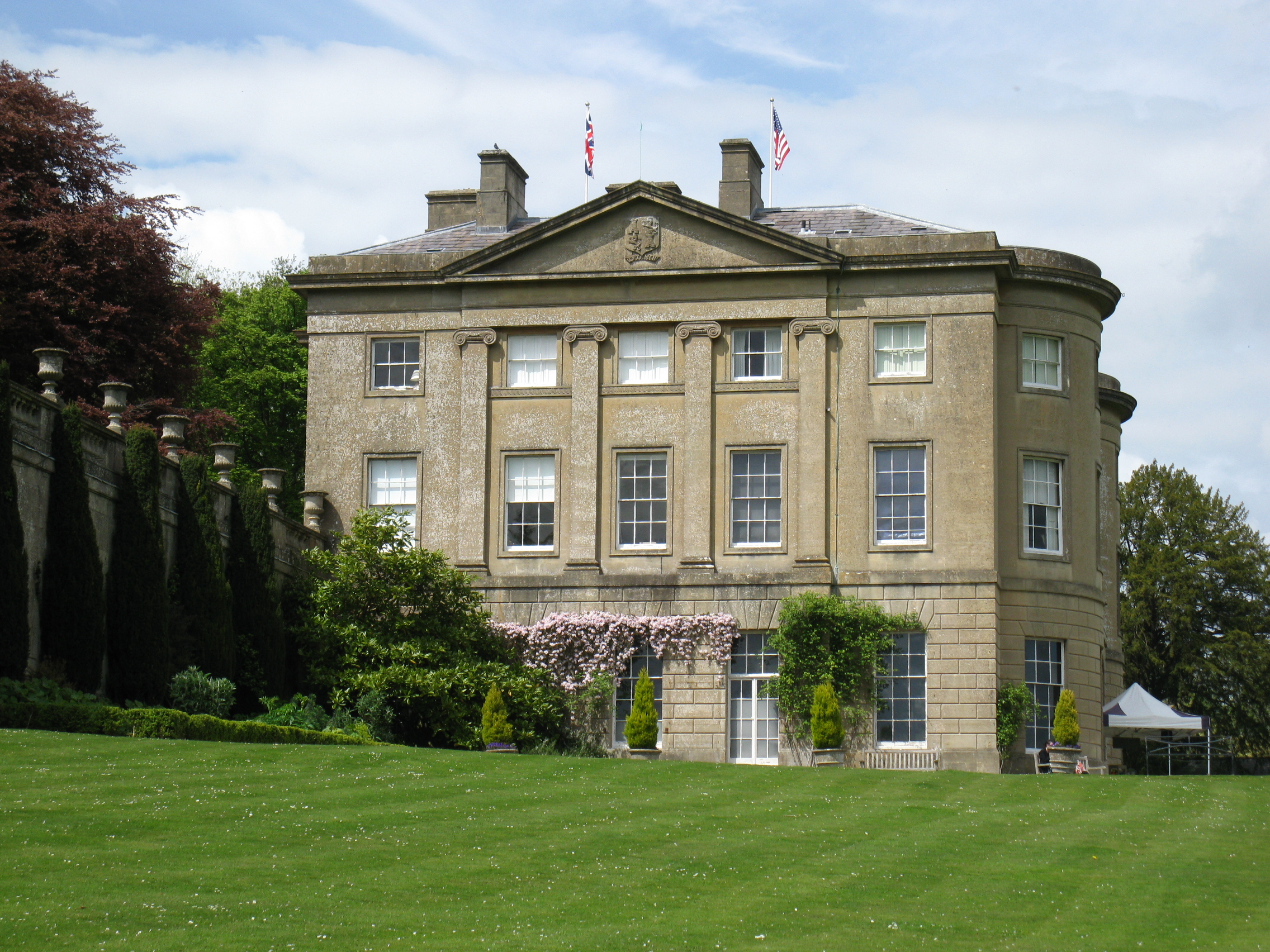
Claverton Manor

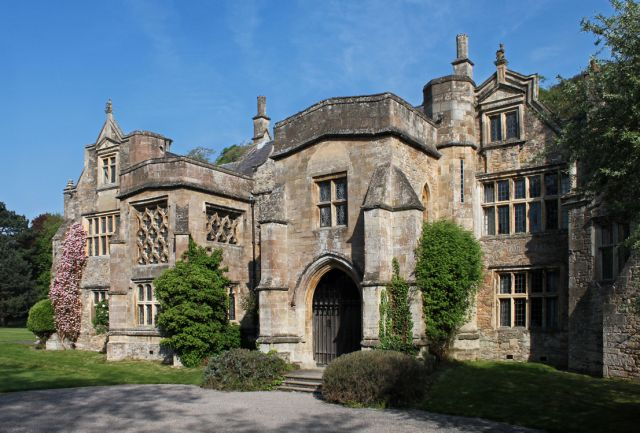
Clevedon Court

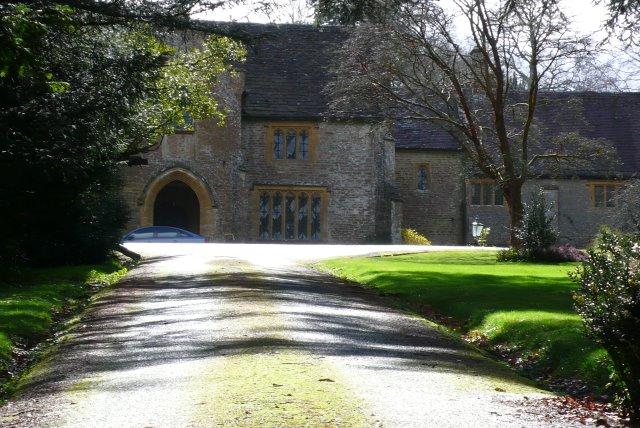
Coker Court

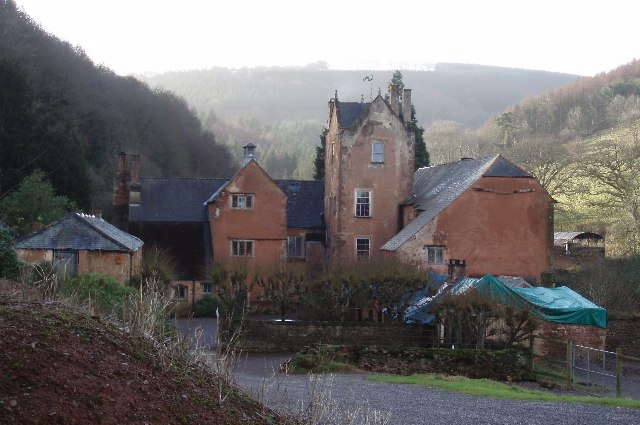
Combe Sydenham

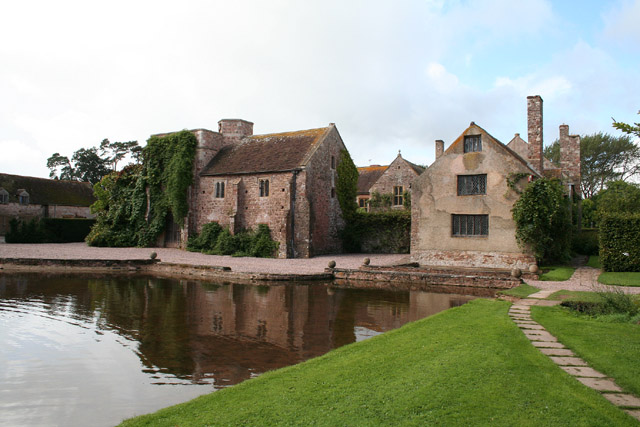
Cothay Manor

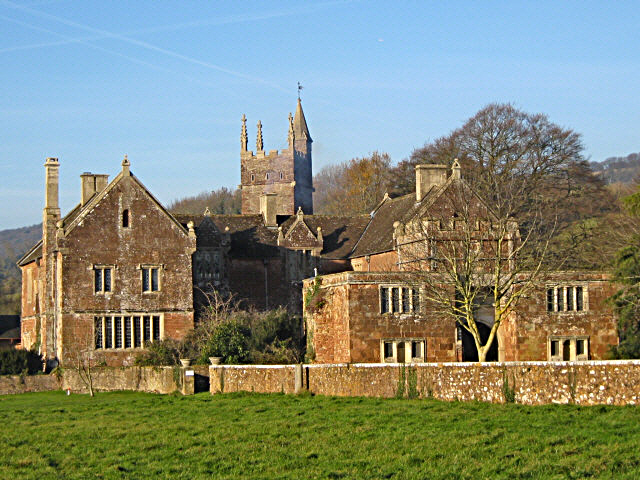
Cothelstone Manor

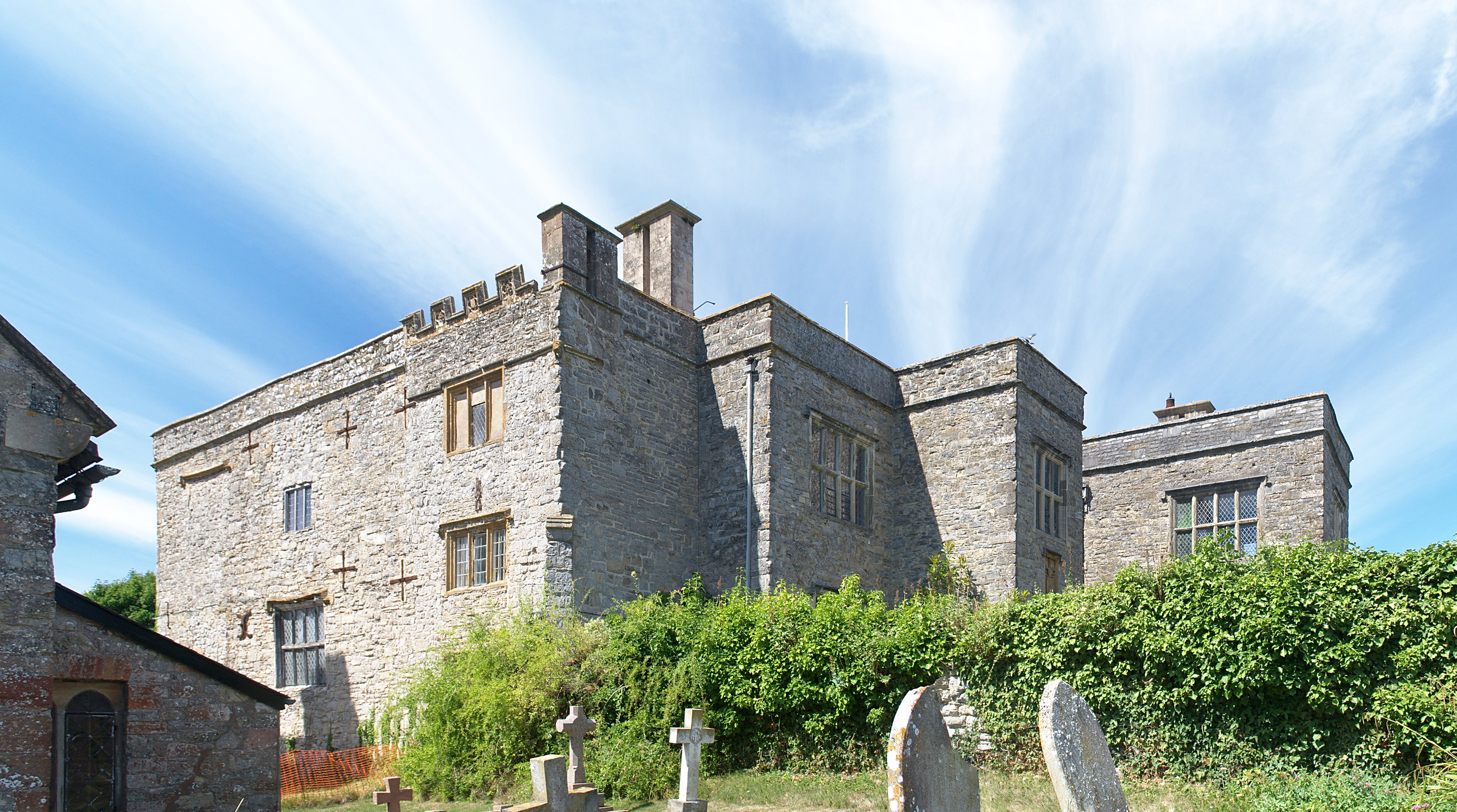
Court House, East Quantoxhead

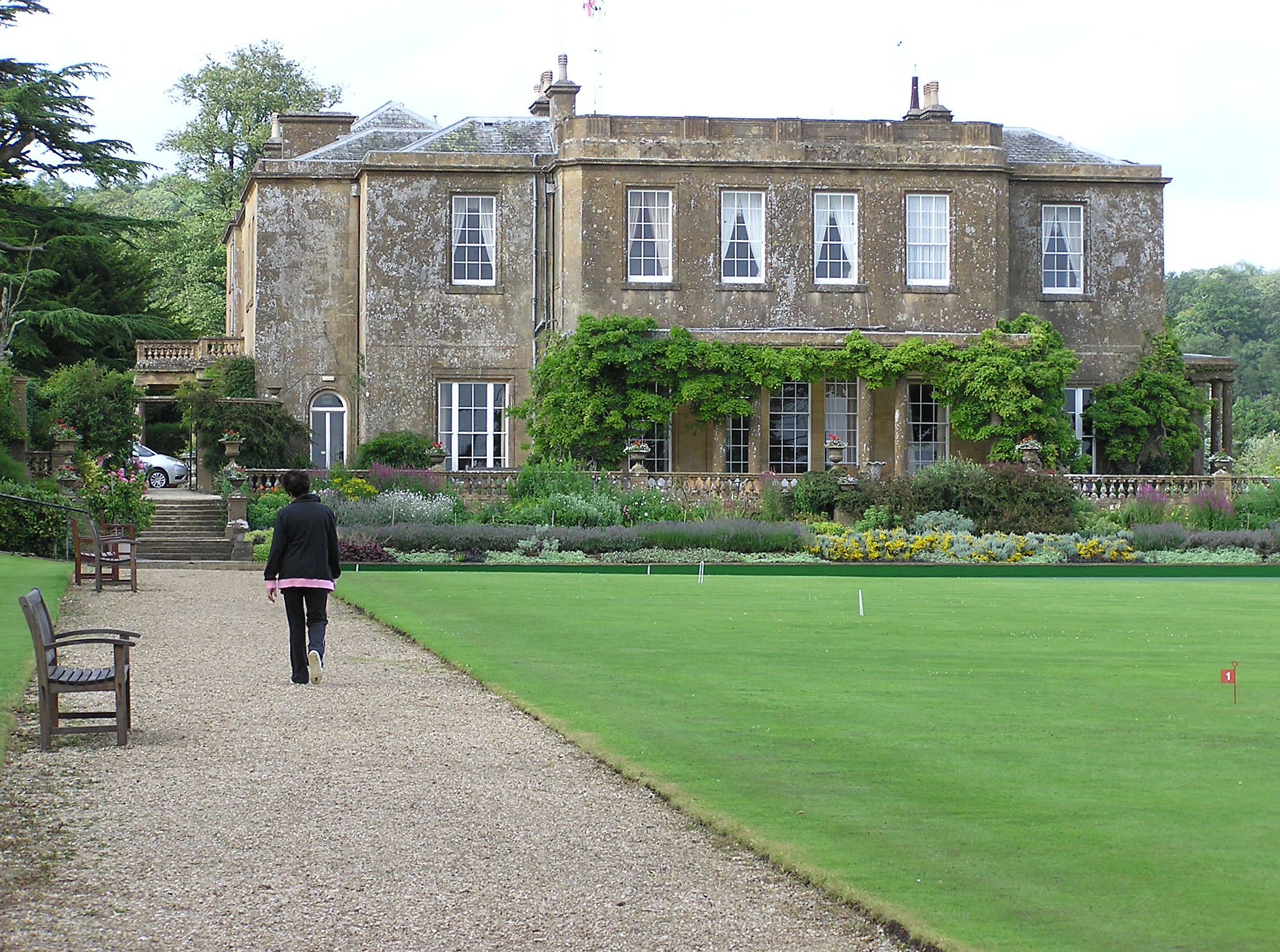
Cricket St Thomas

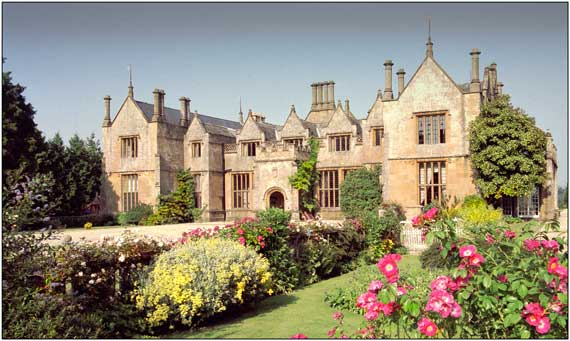
Dillington House

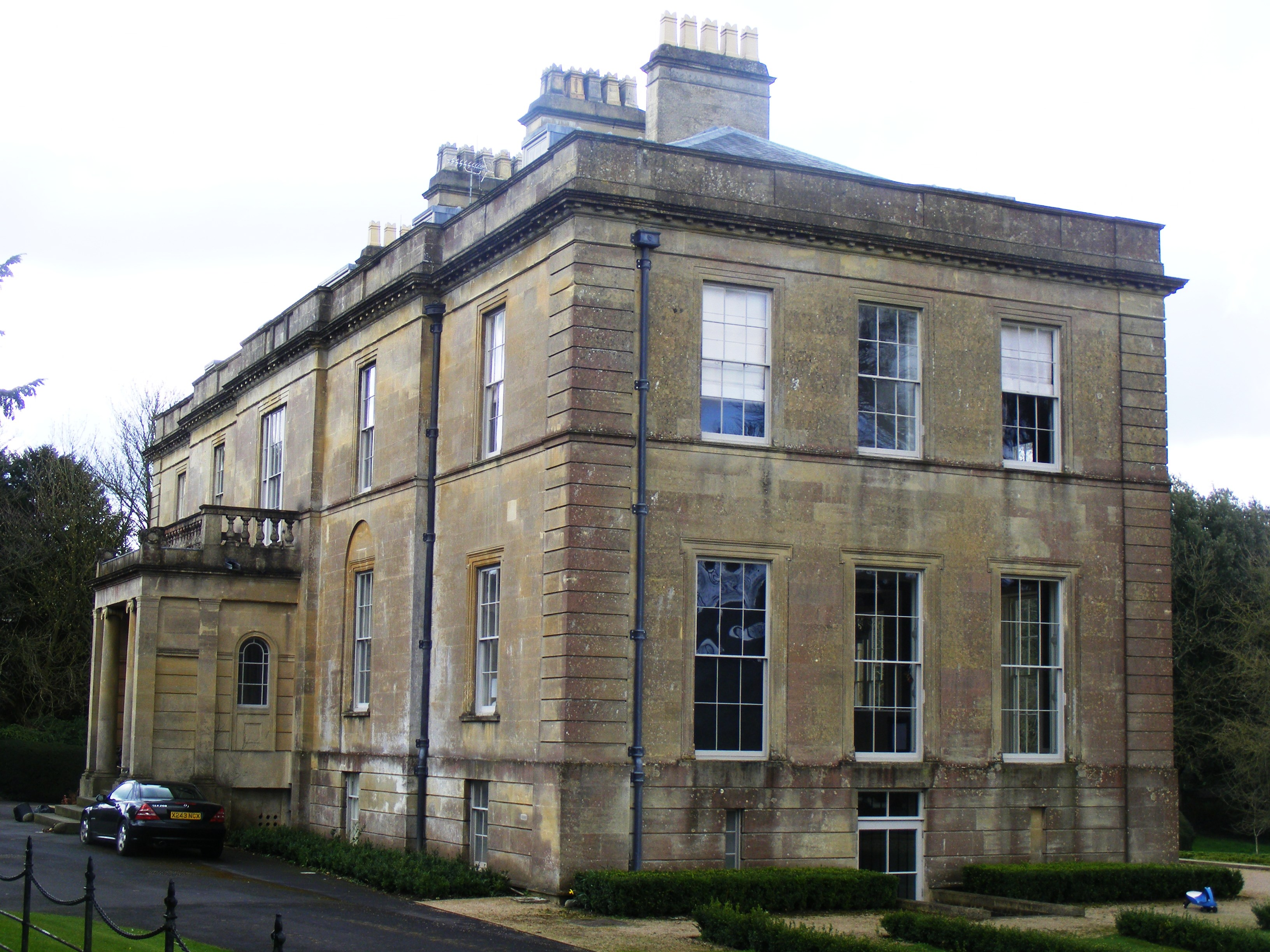
Dinder House

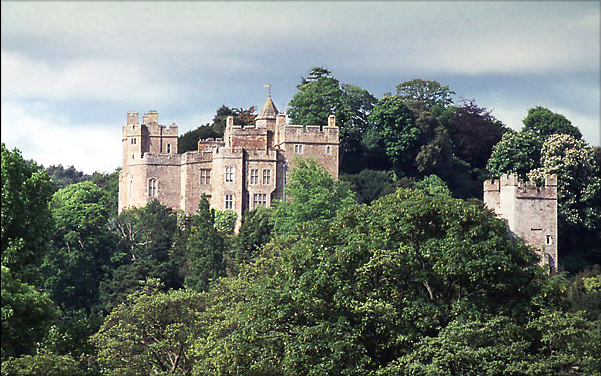
Dunster Castle

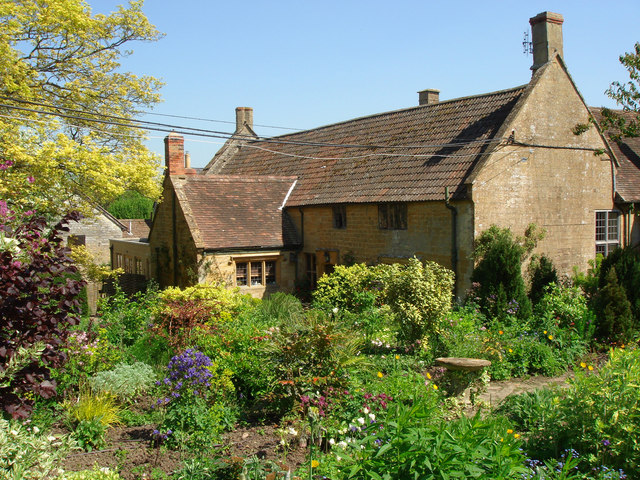
East Lambrook Manor

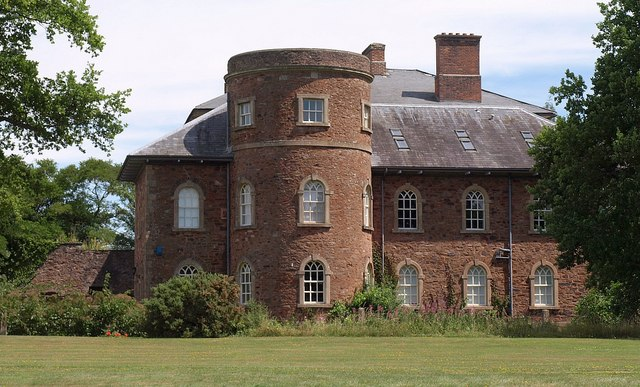
Enmore Castle

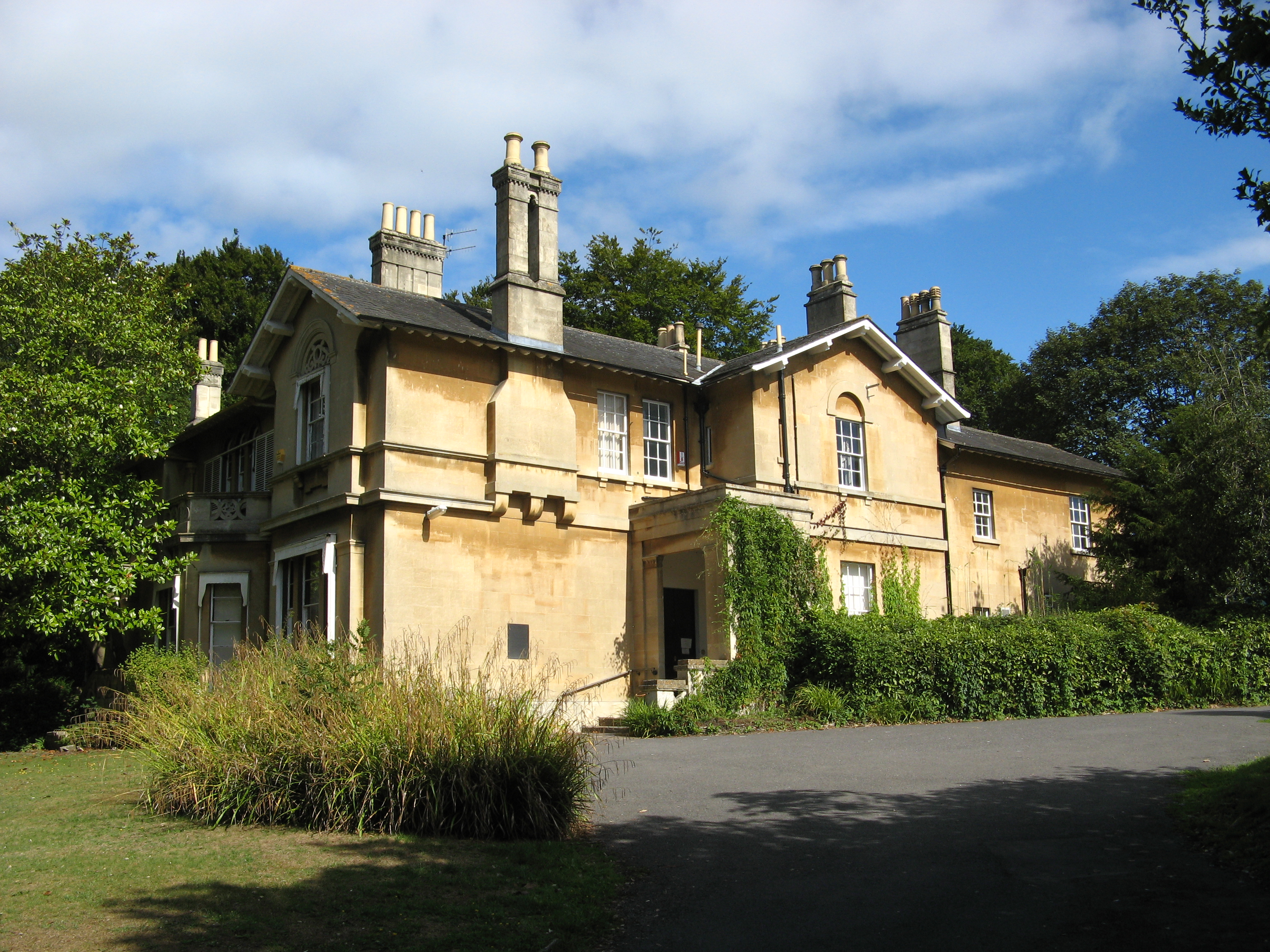
Fairfield House, Bath

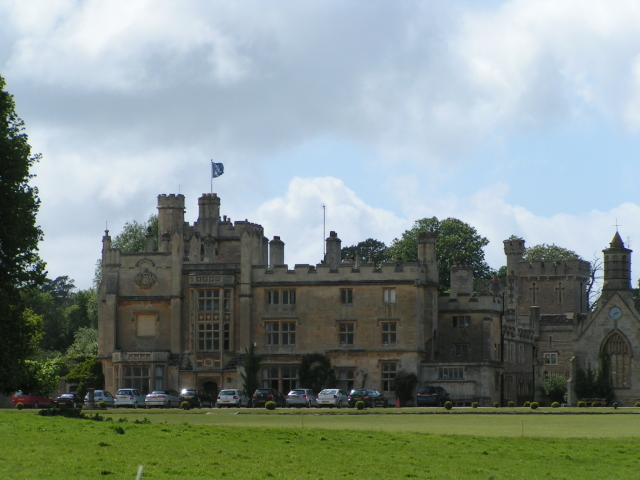
Farleigh House

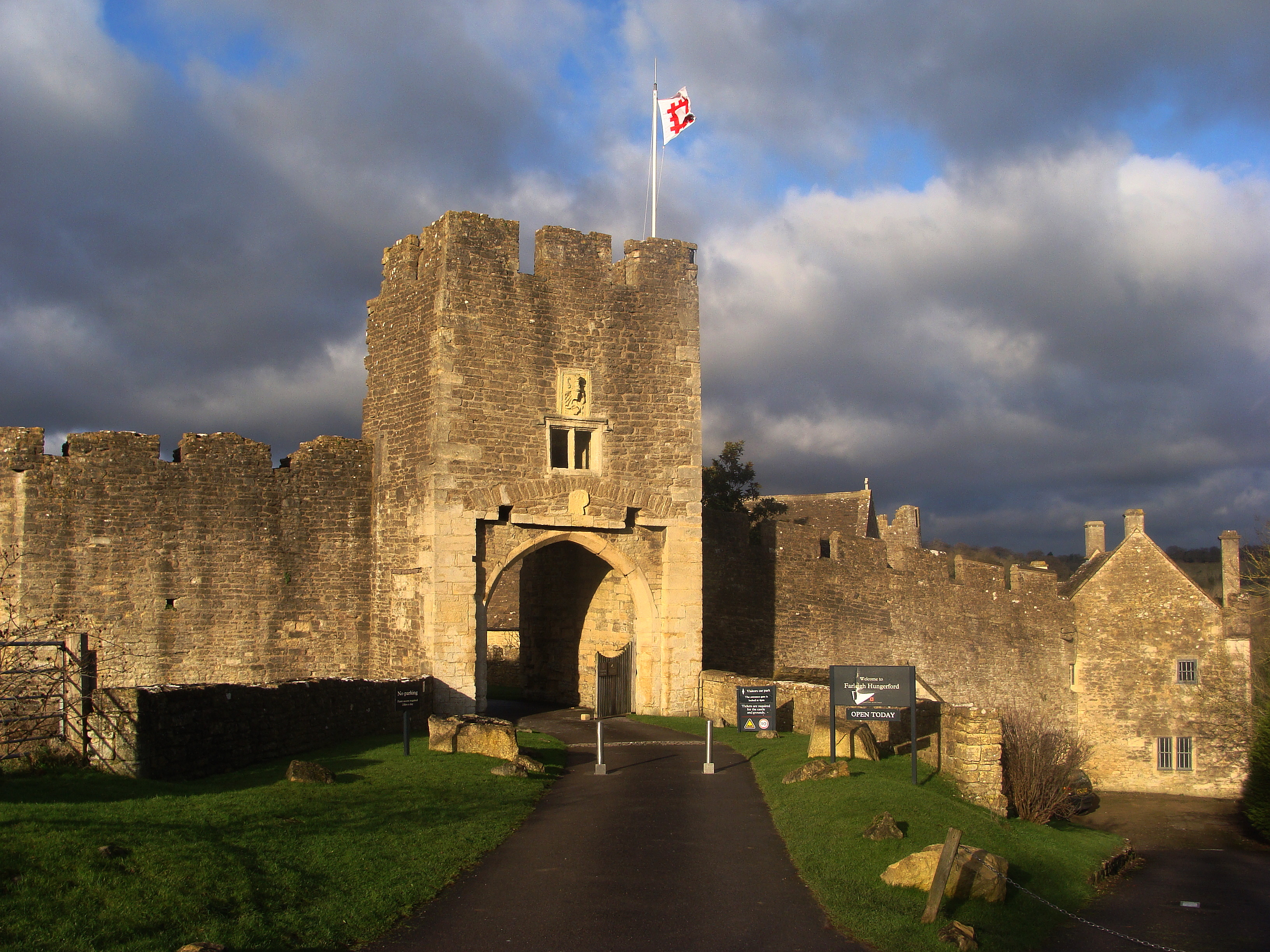
Farleigh Hungerford Castle

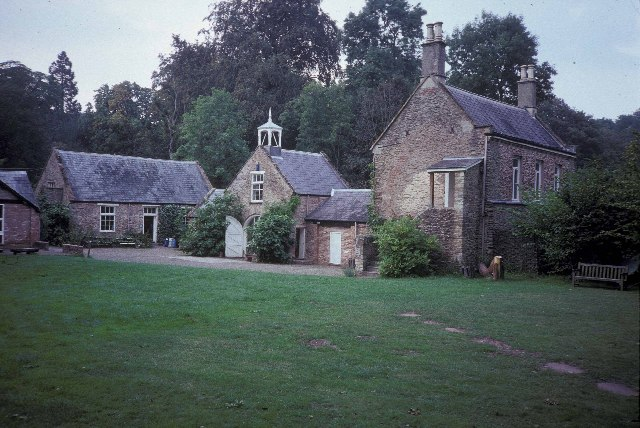
Fyne Court

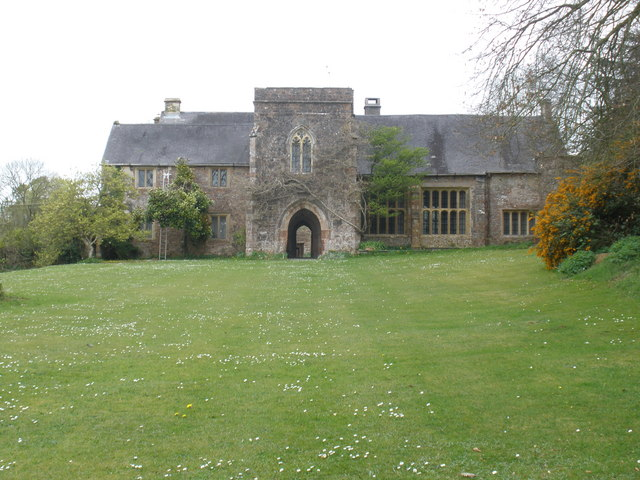
Greenham Barton

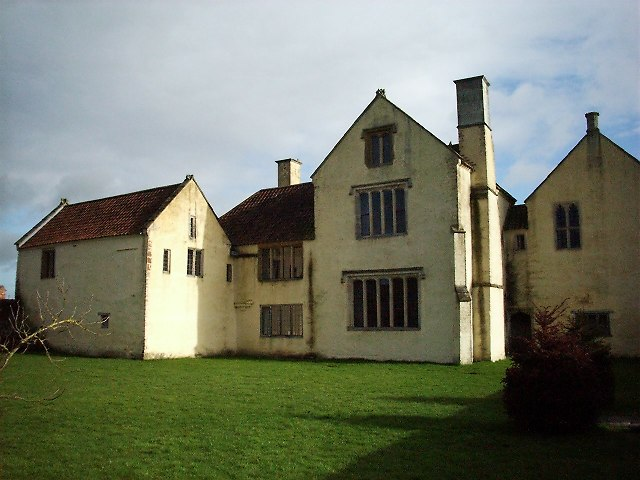
Gurney Manor

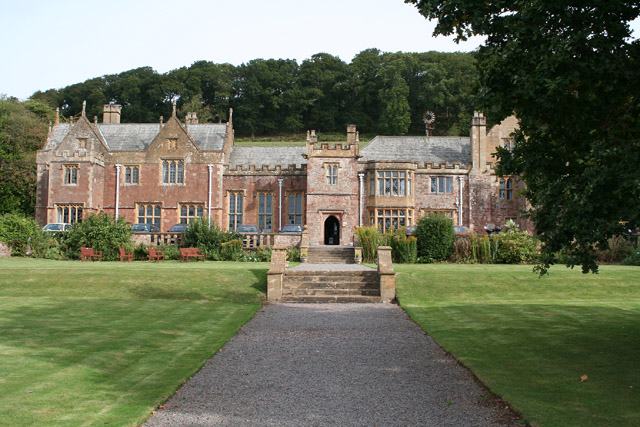
Halsway Manor

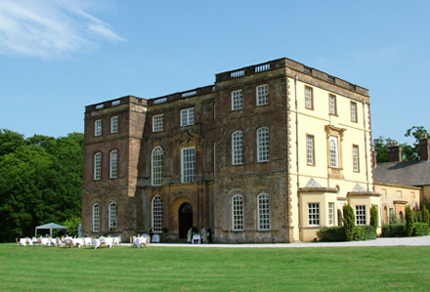
Halswell House

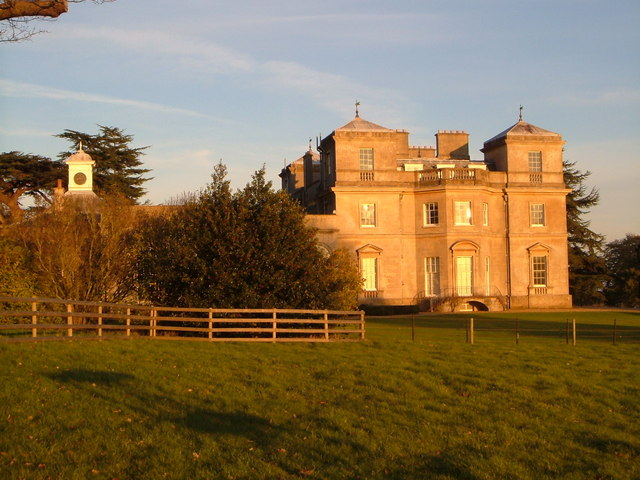
Hatch Court

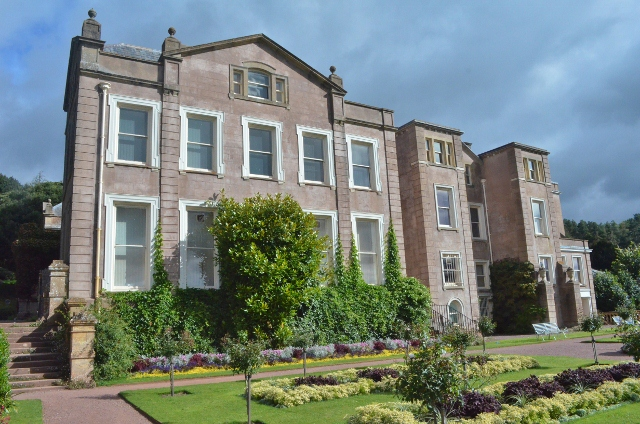
Hestercombe House

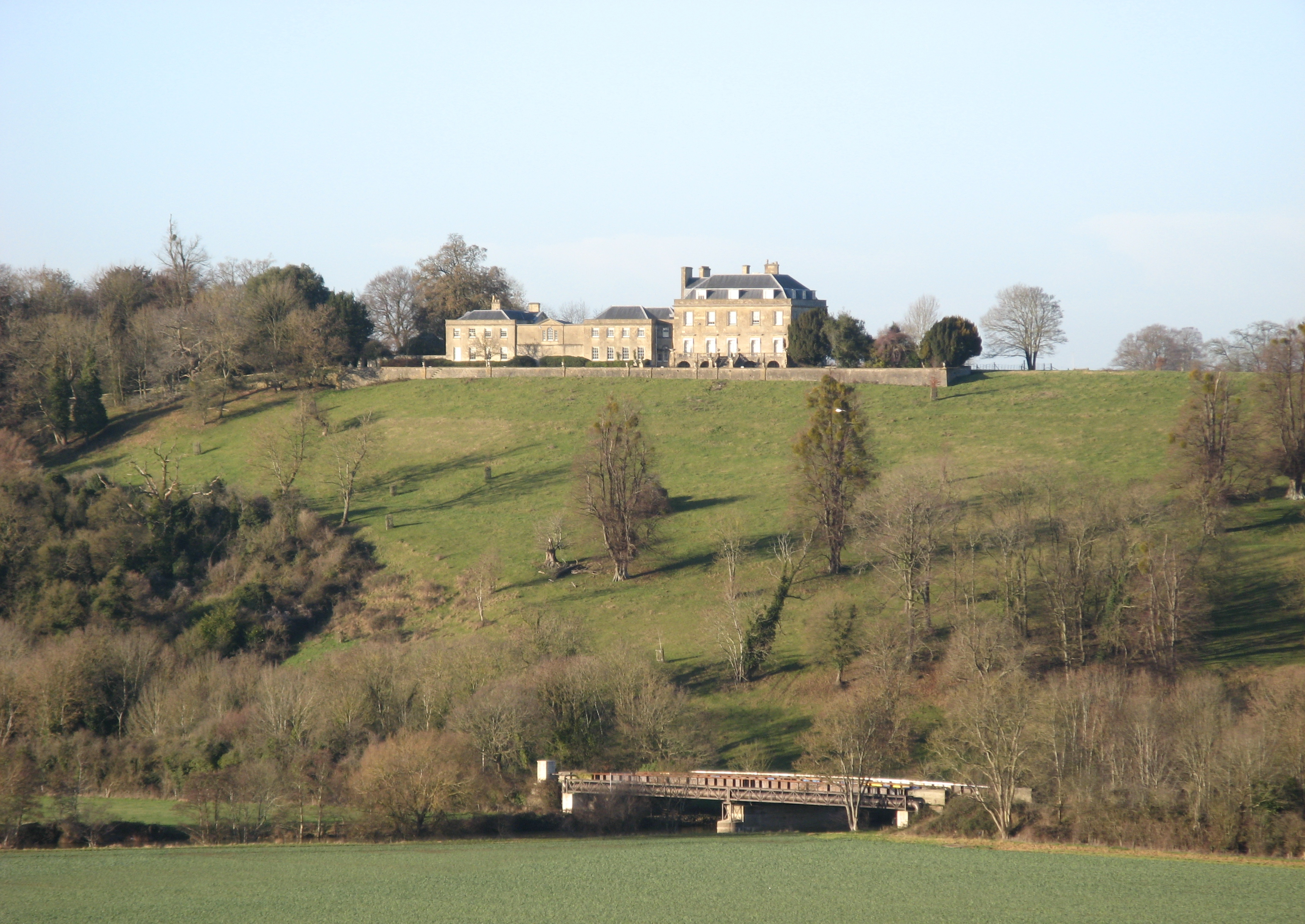
Kelston Park

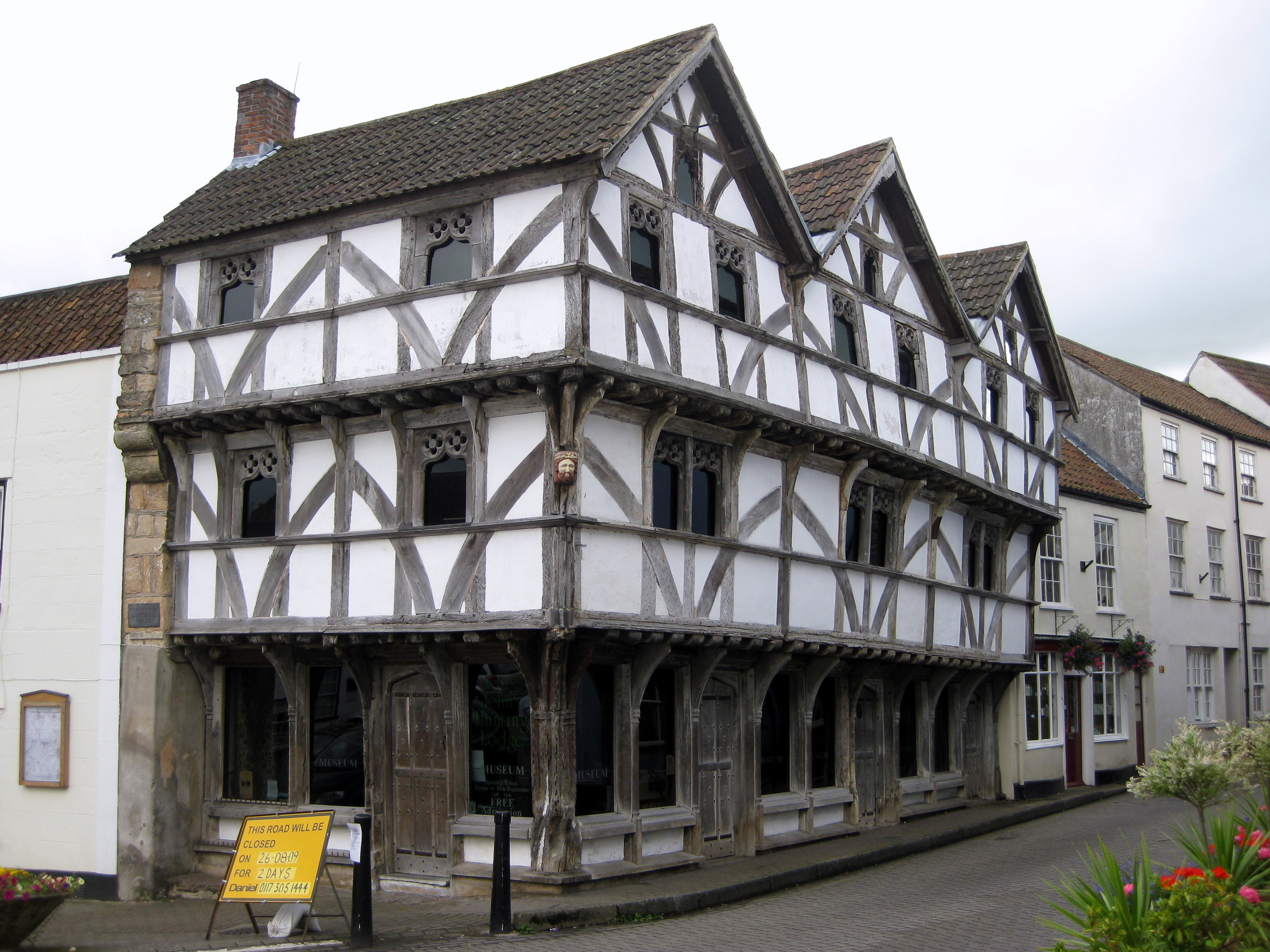
King John's Hunting Lodge, Axbridge

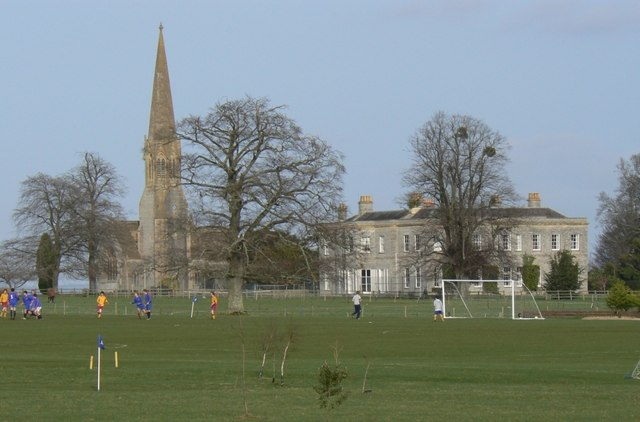
Kingweston House

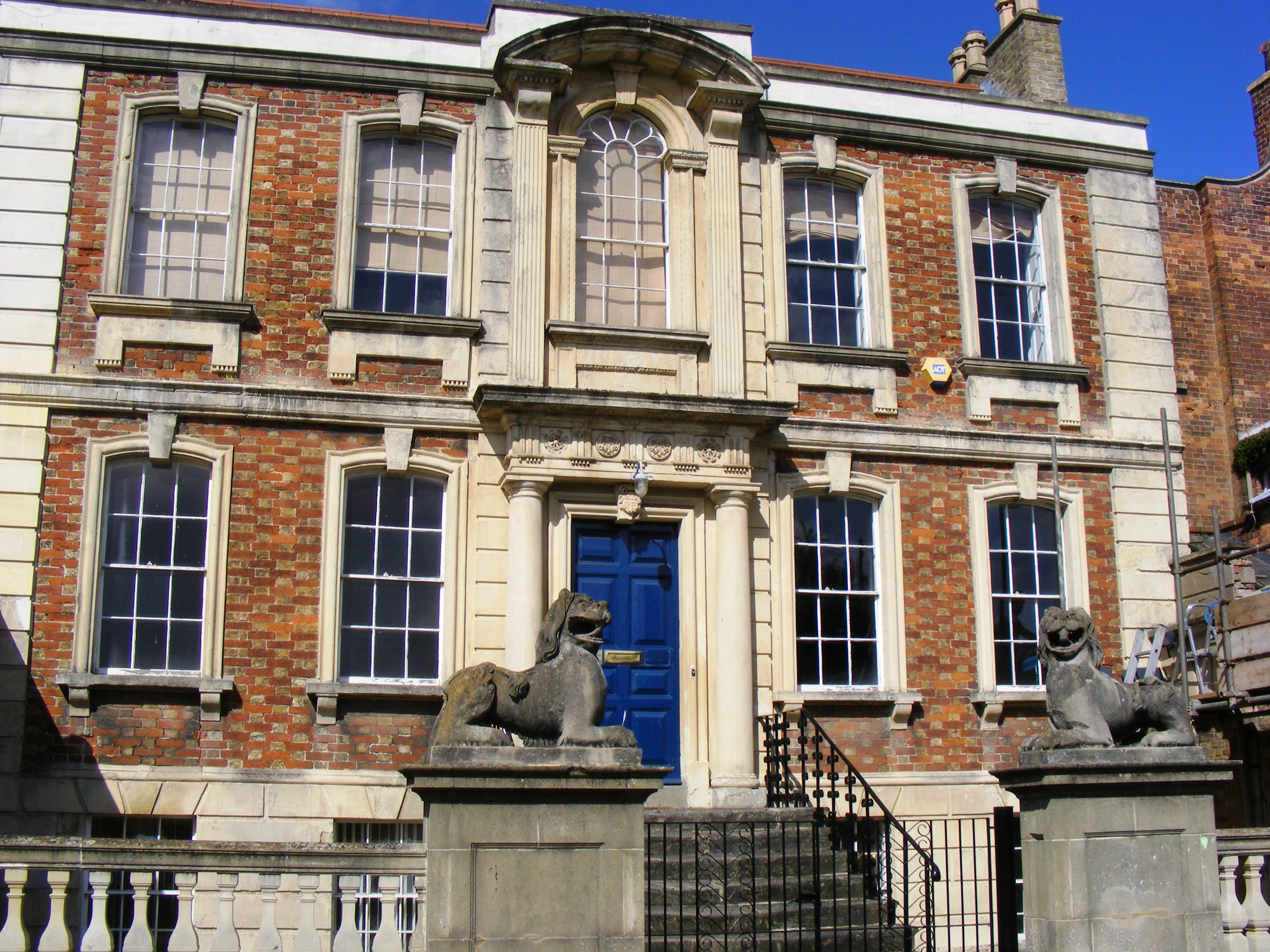
Lions House, Bridgwater

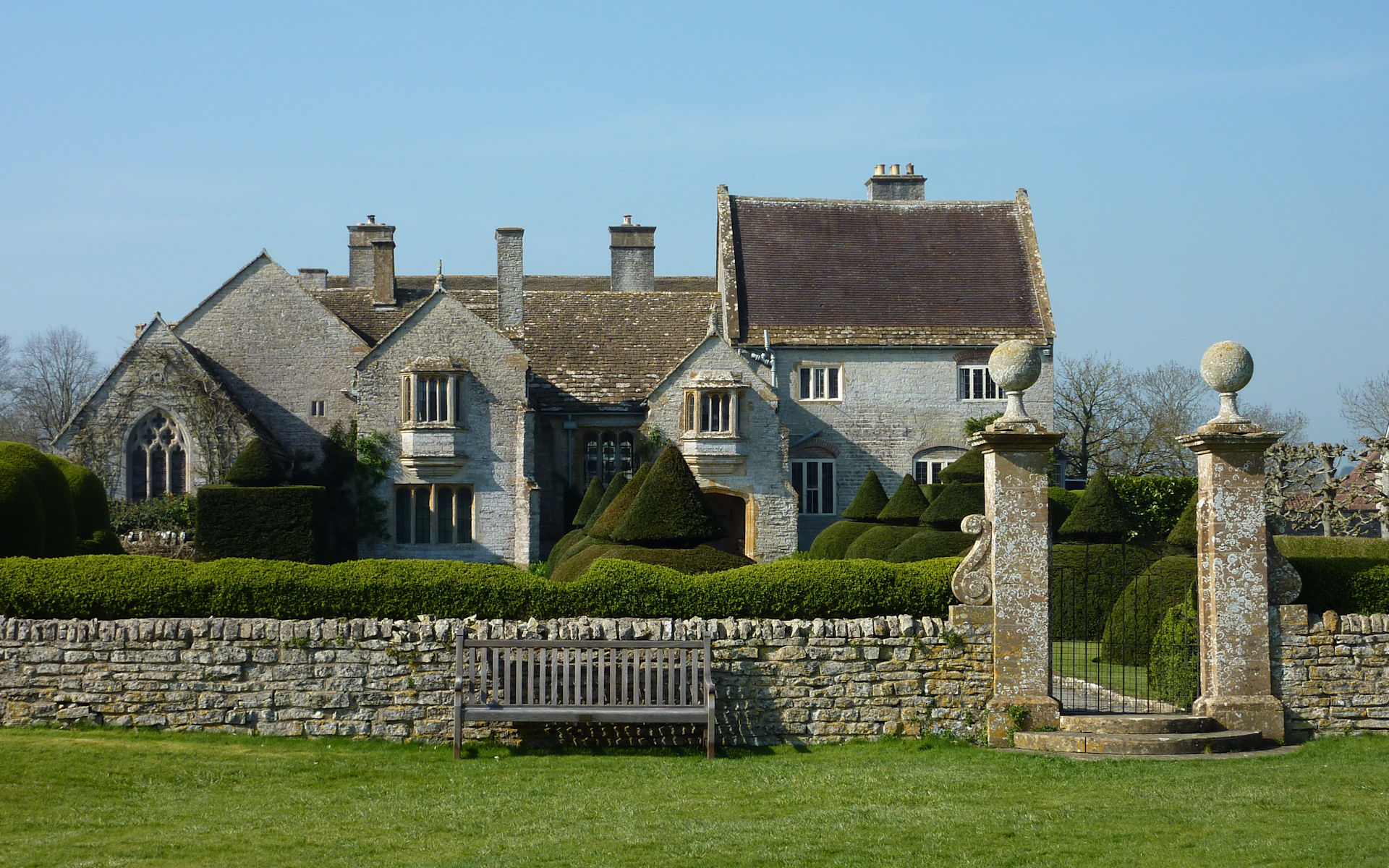
Lytes Cary

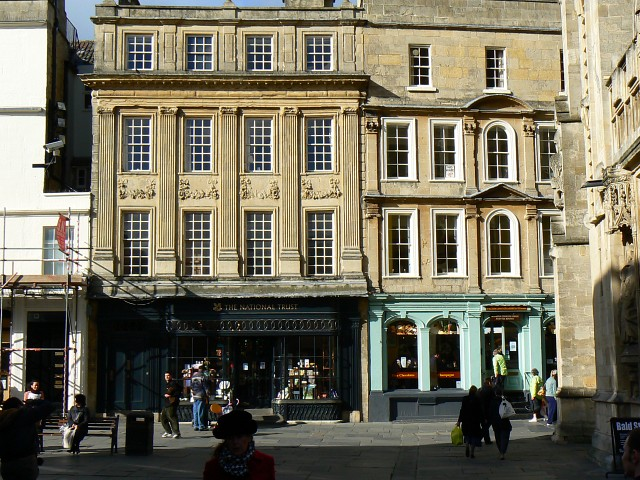
Marshal Wade's House

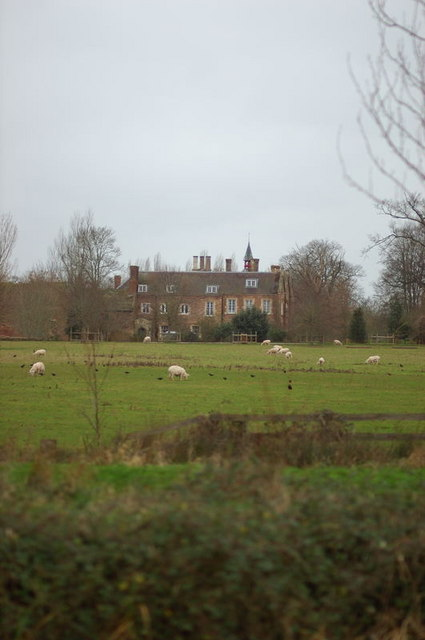
Maunsel House

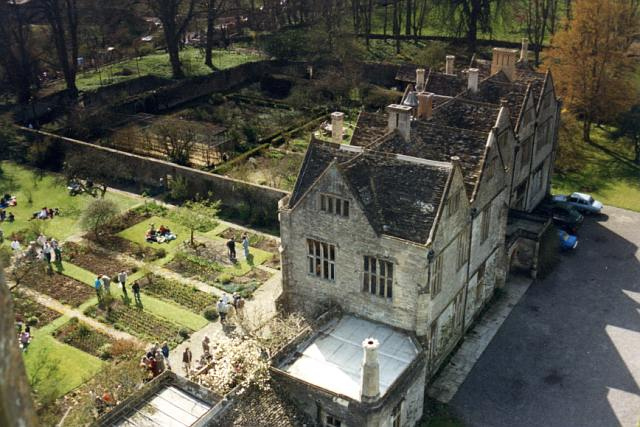
Mells Manor

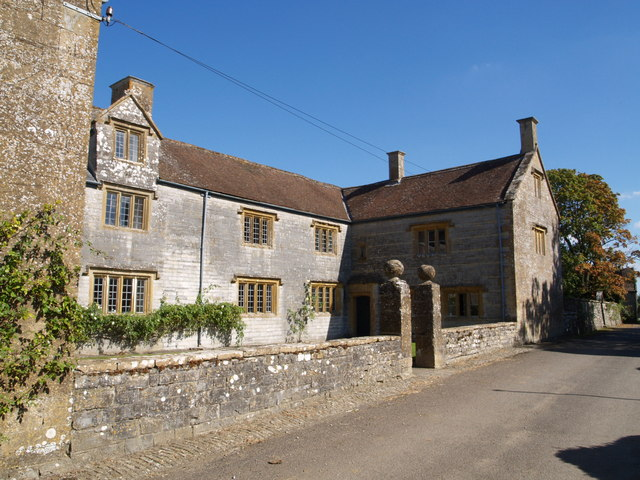
Midelney Manor

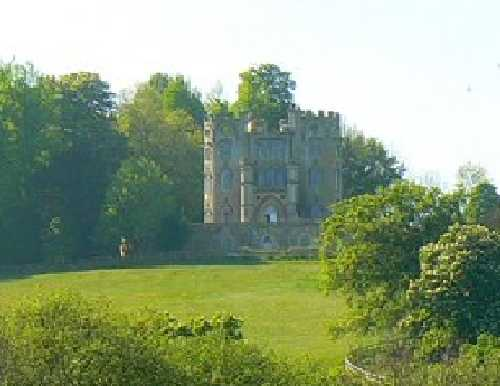
Midford Castle

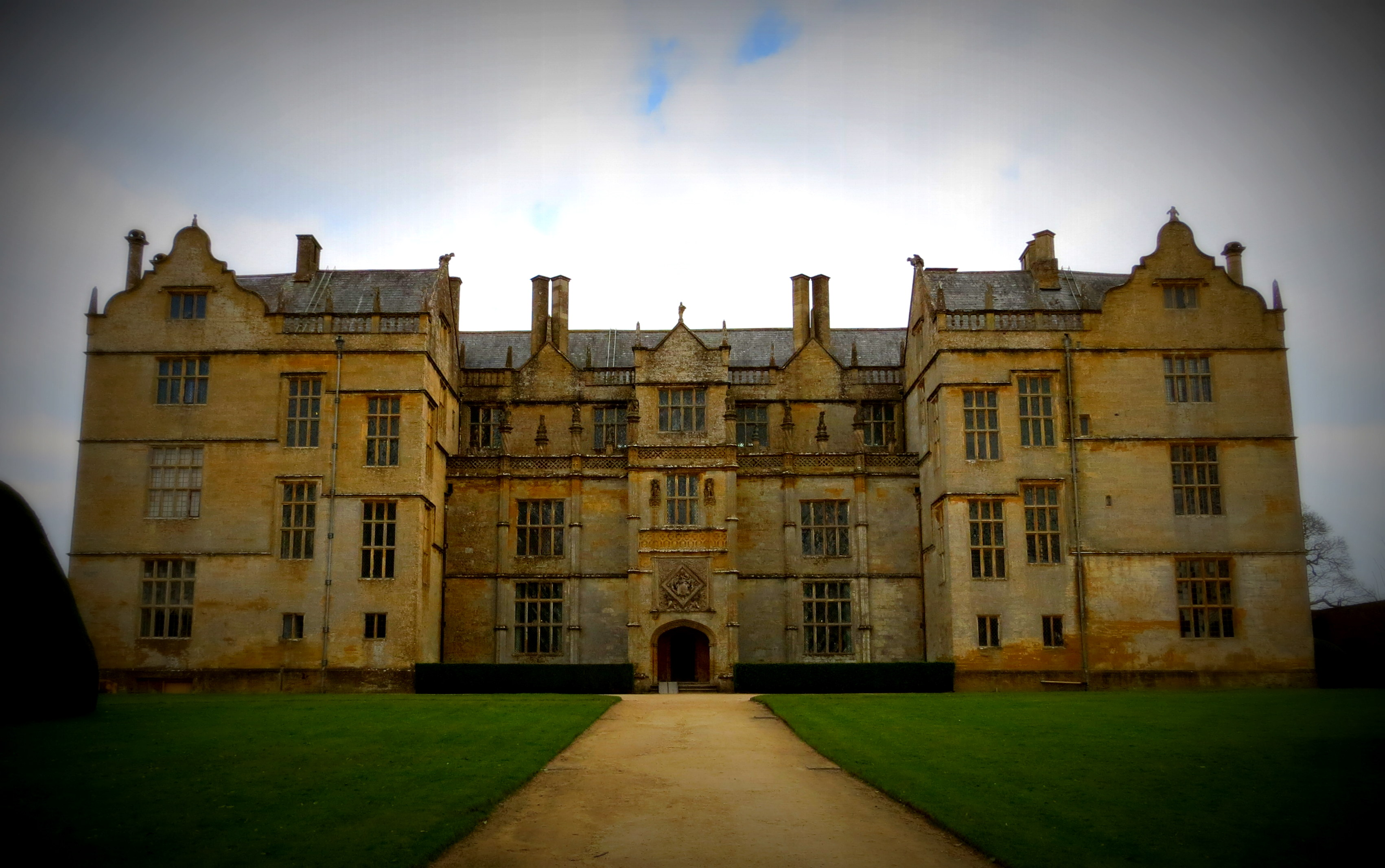
Montacute House

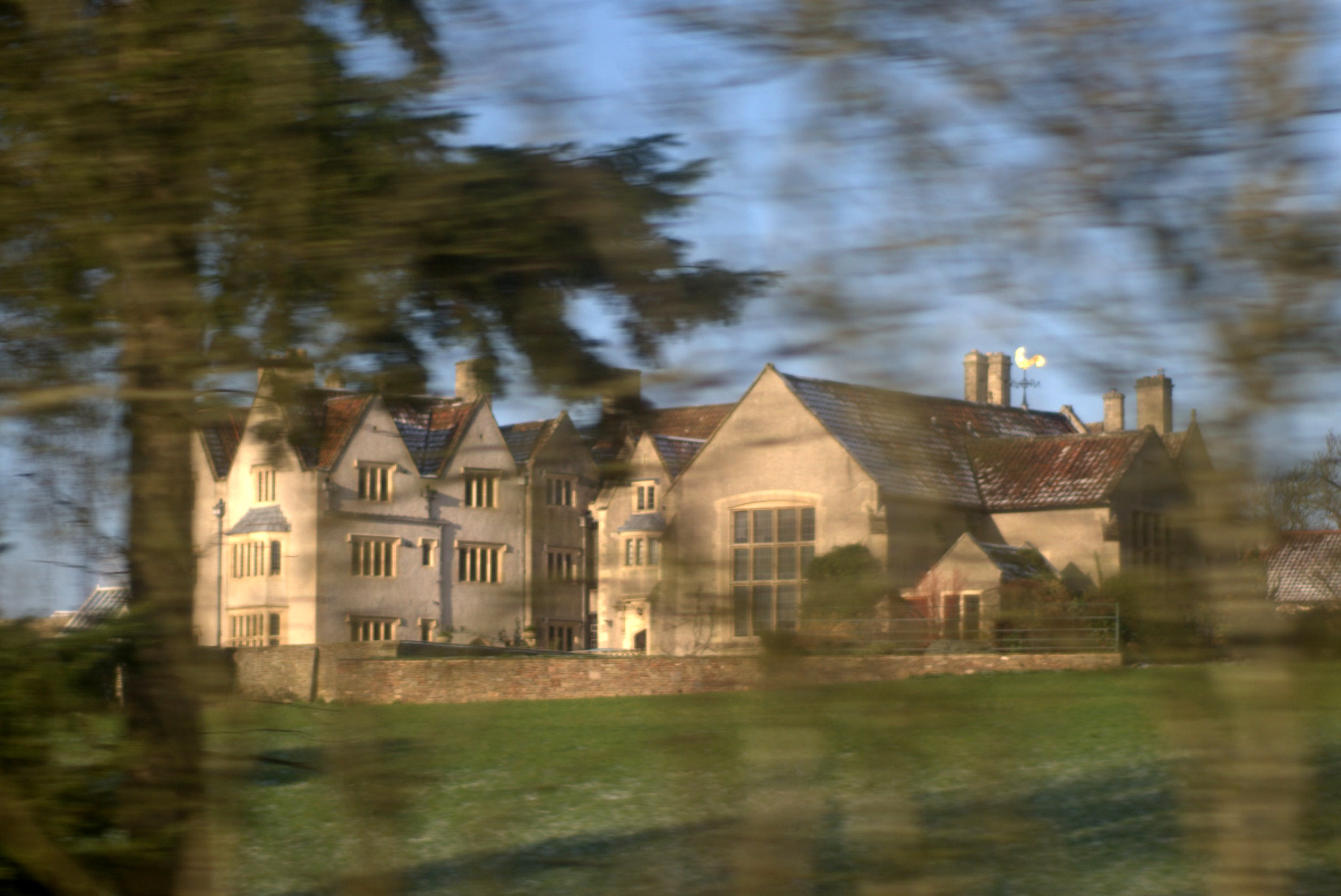
Nailsea Court

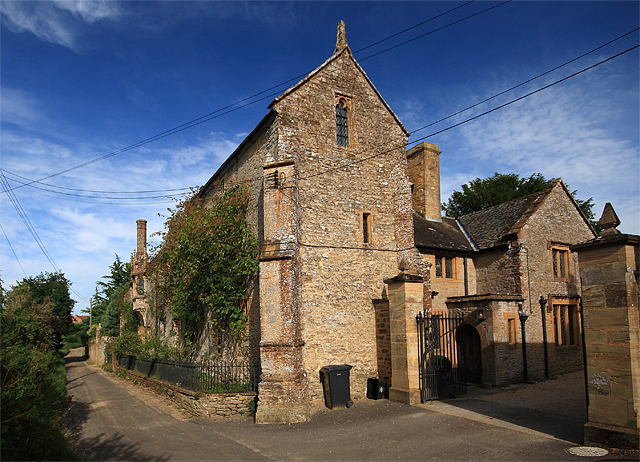
Naish Priory

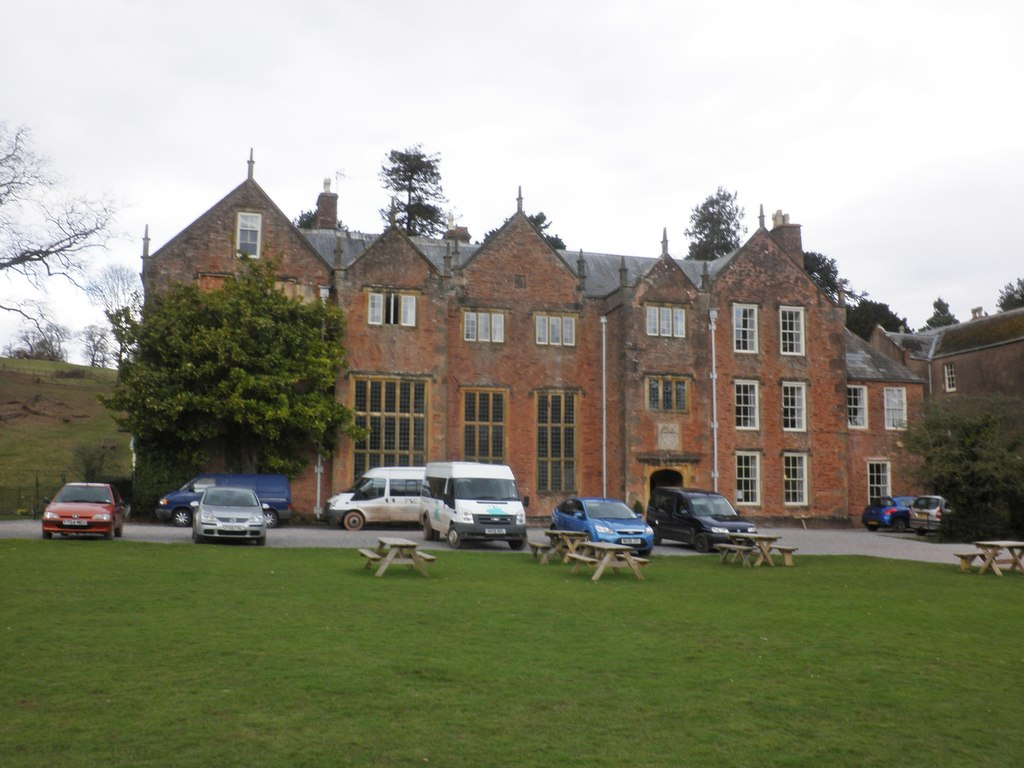
Nettlecombe Court

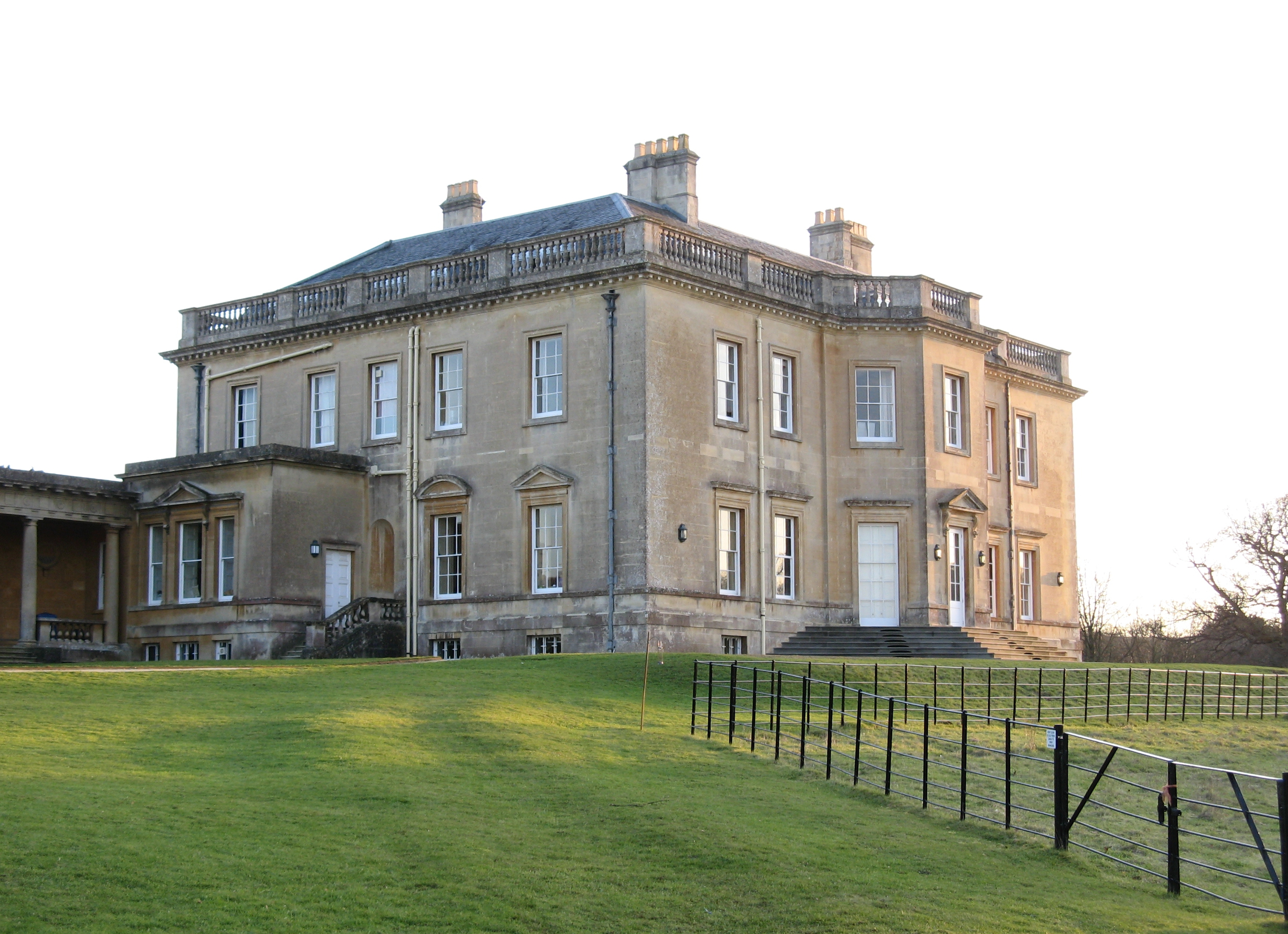
Newton Park

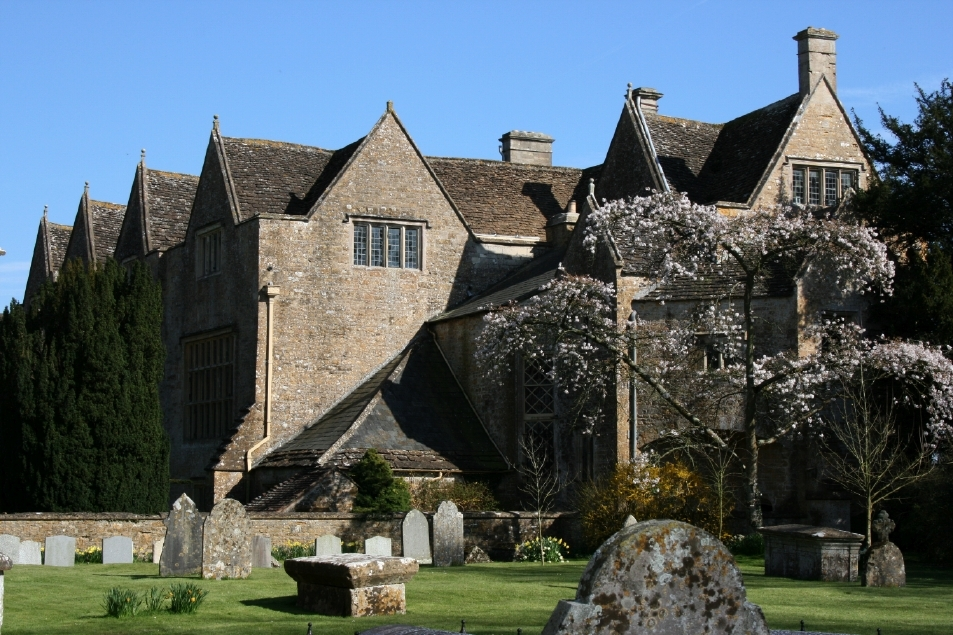
North Cadbury Court

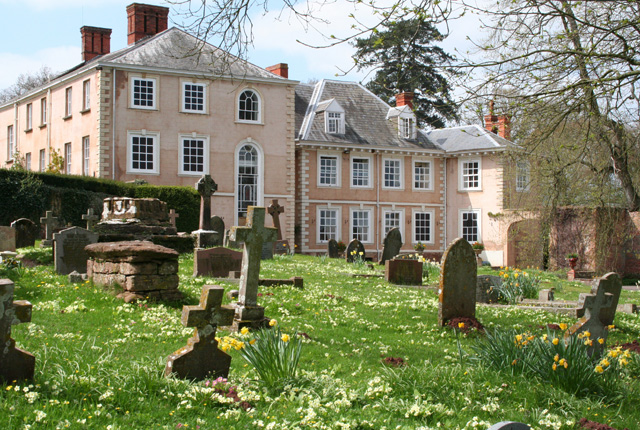
Nynehead Court

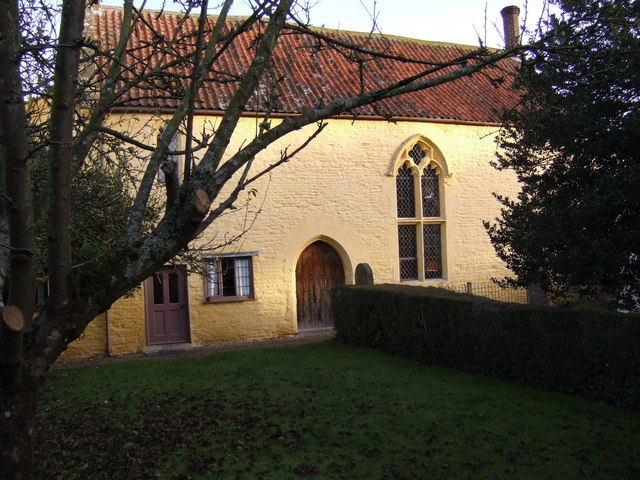
The Old Manor, Croscombe

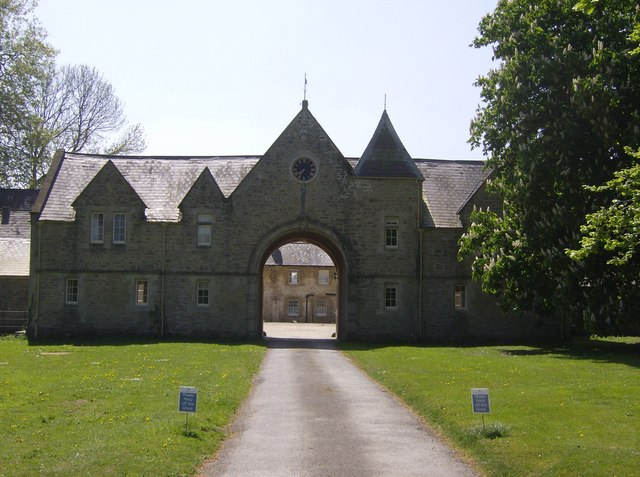
Orchardleigh Estate

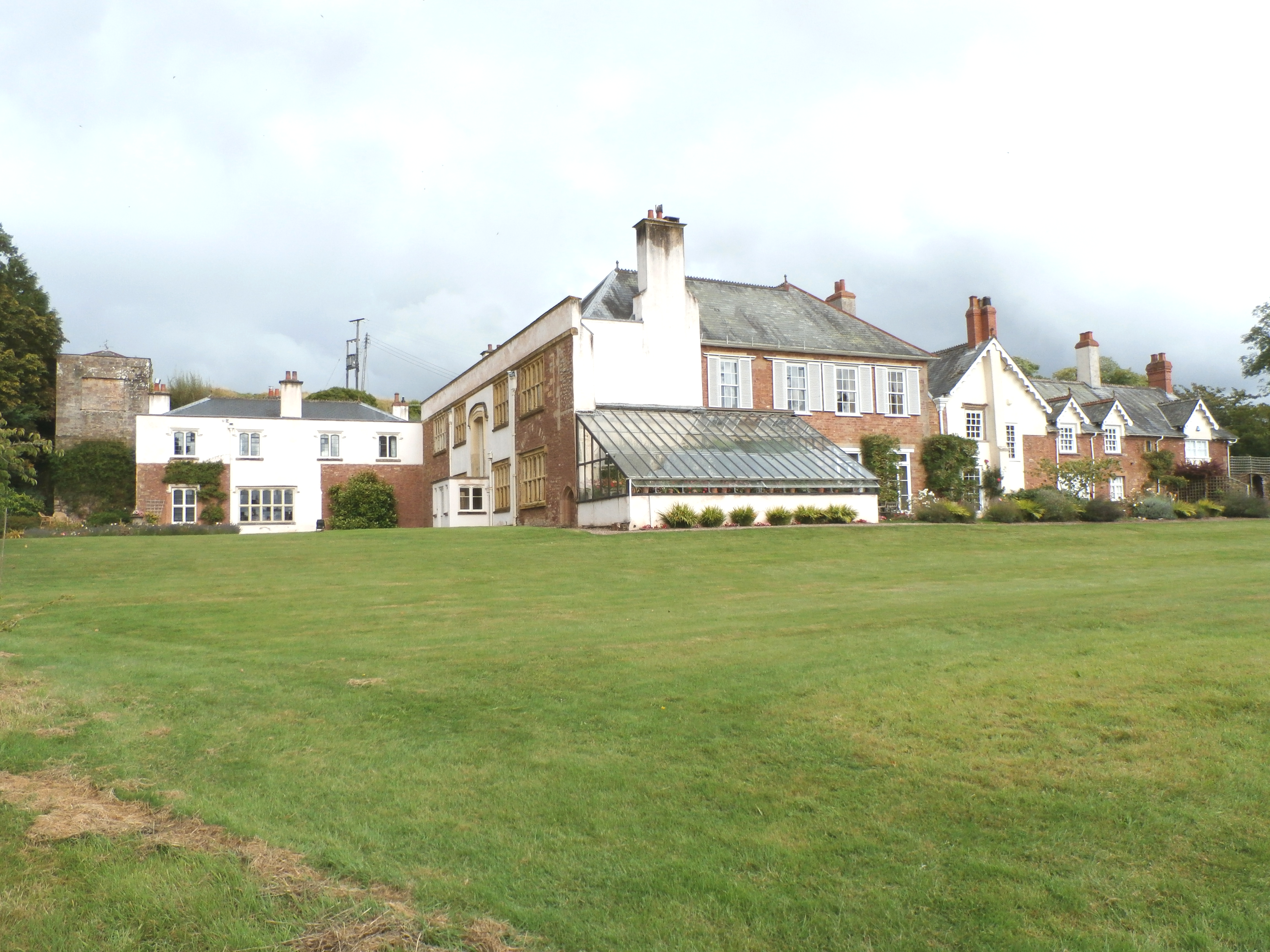
Orchard Wyndham

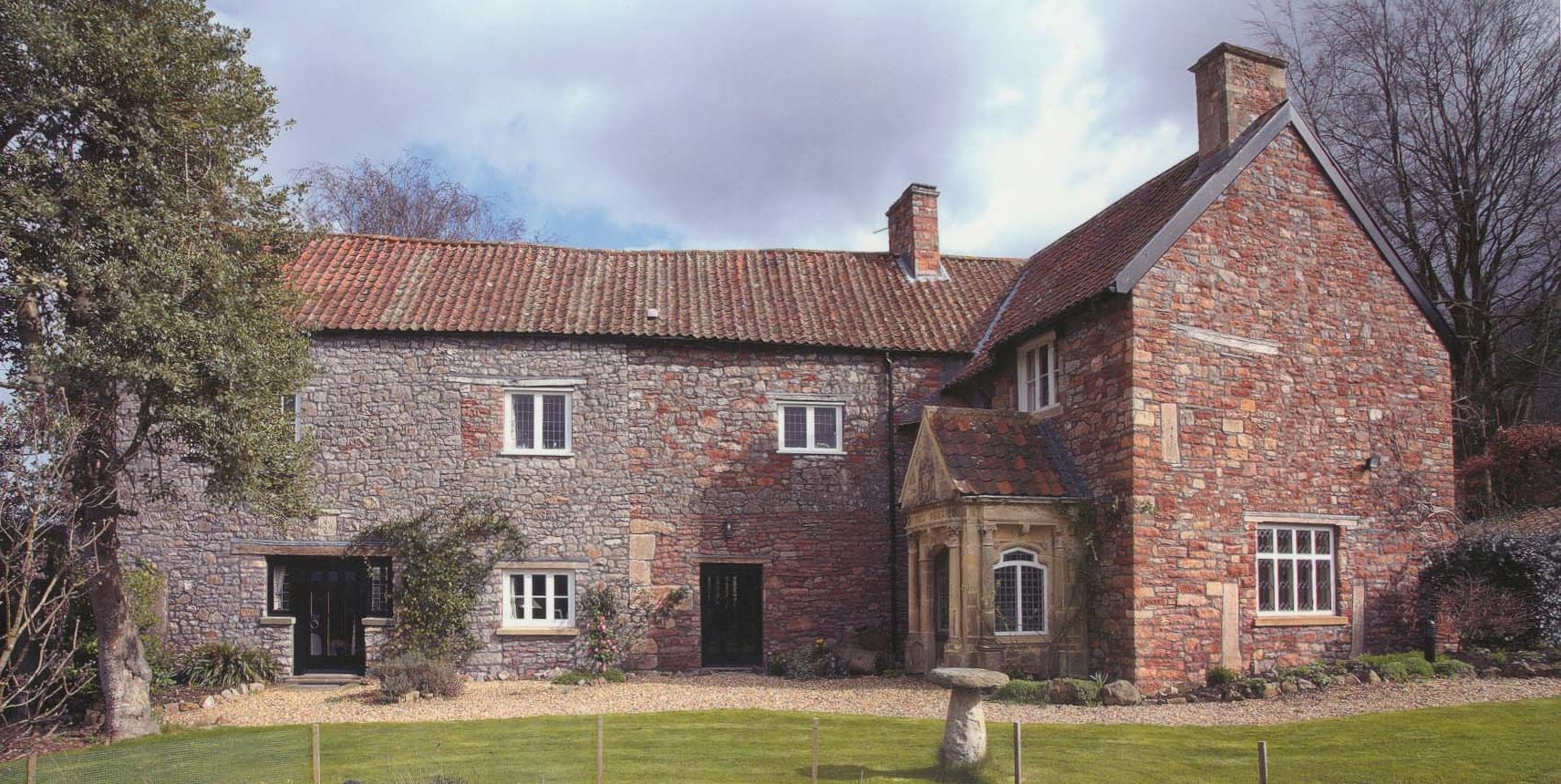
Over Langford Manor

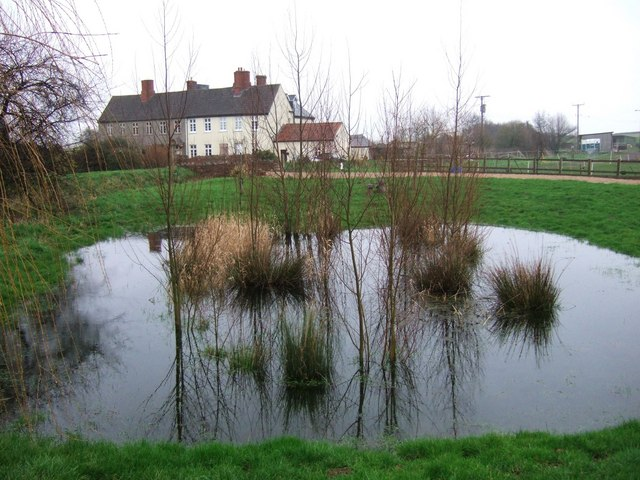
Petherton Park

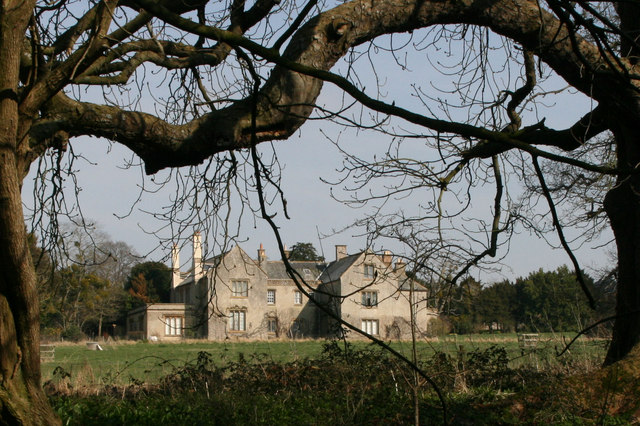
Poundisford Park

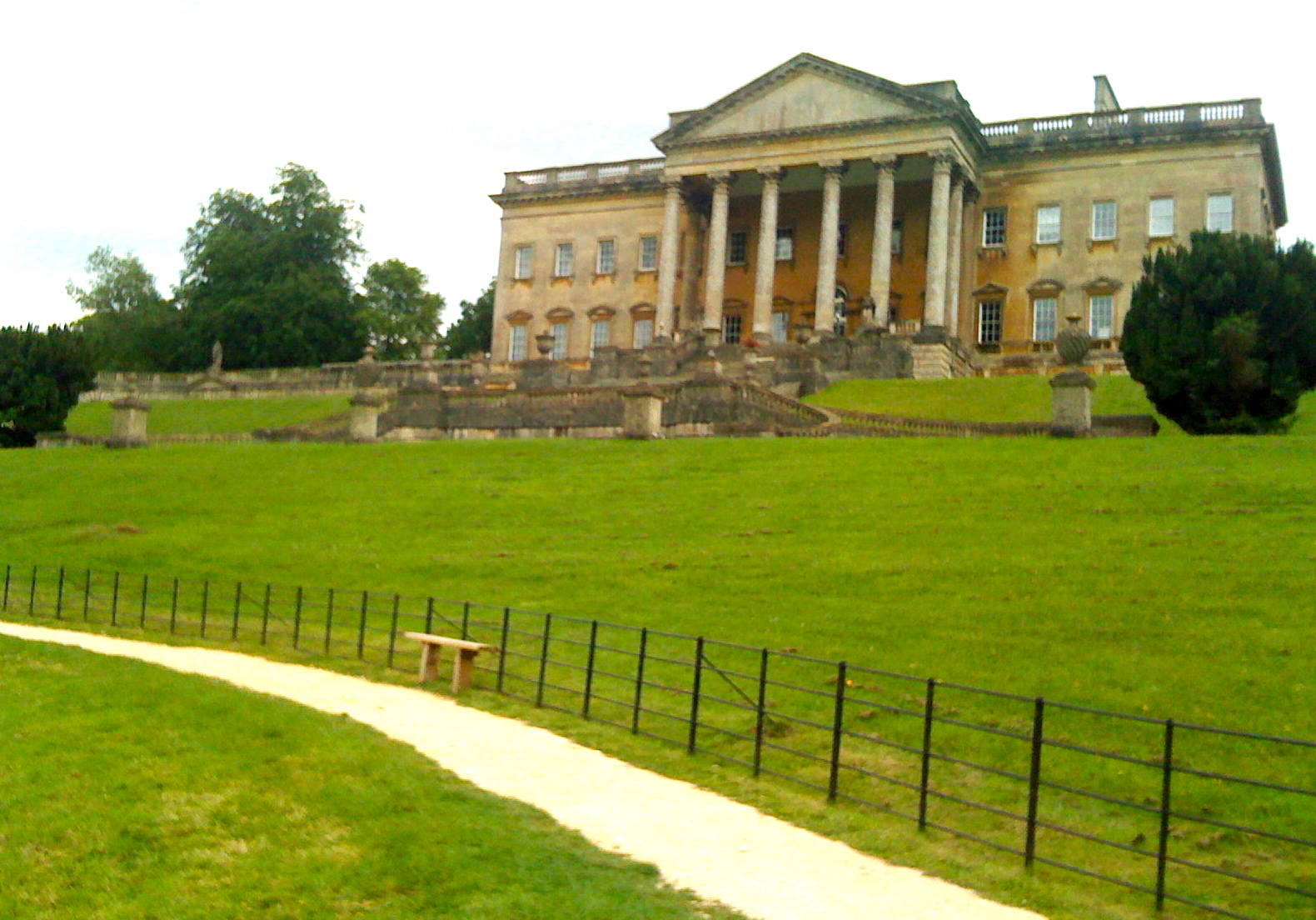
Prior Park

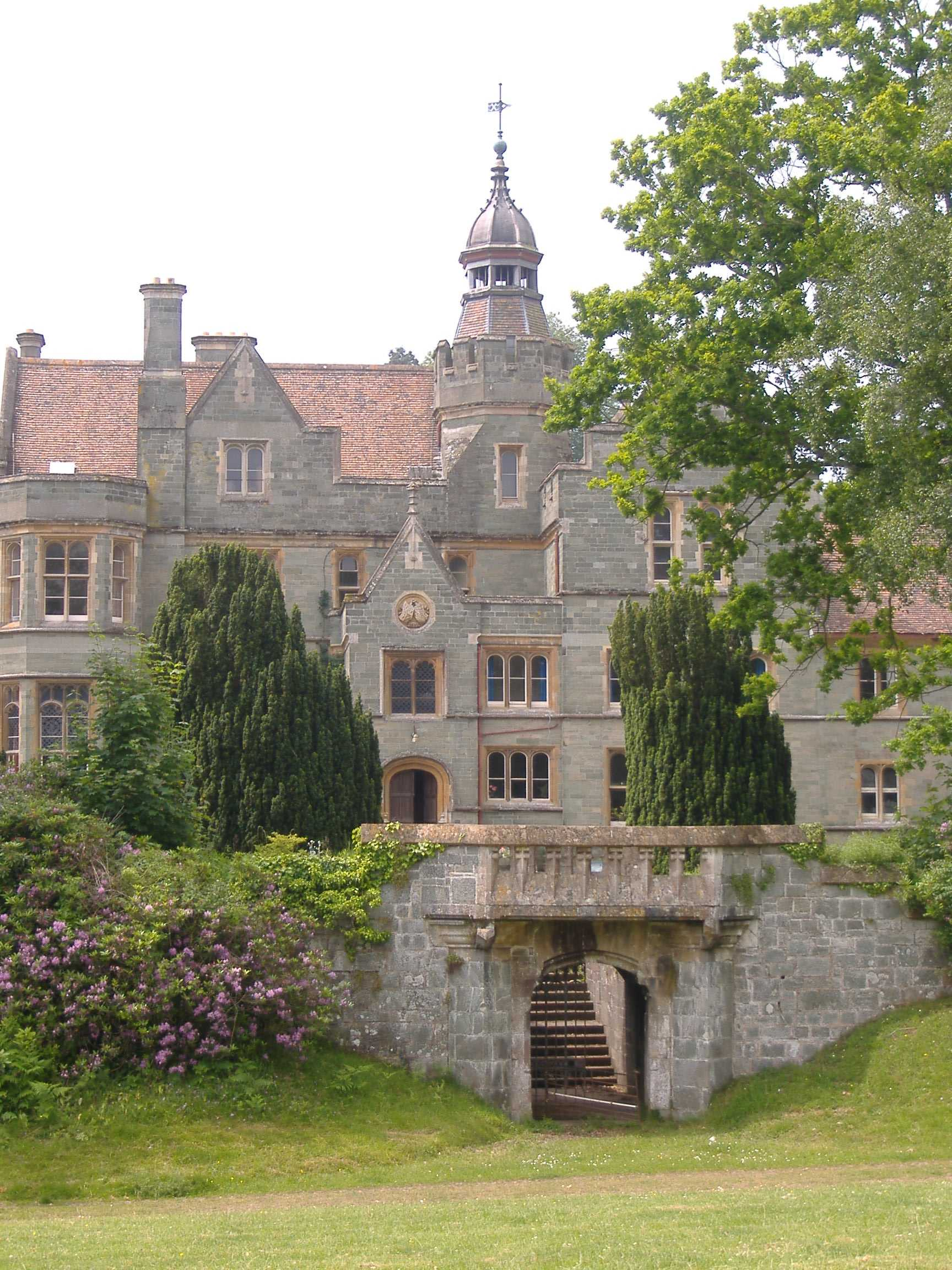
Quantock Lodge

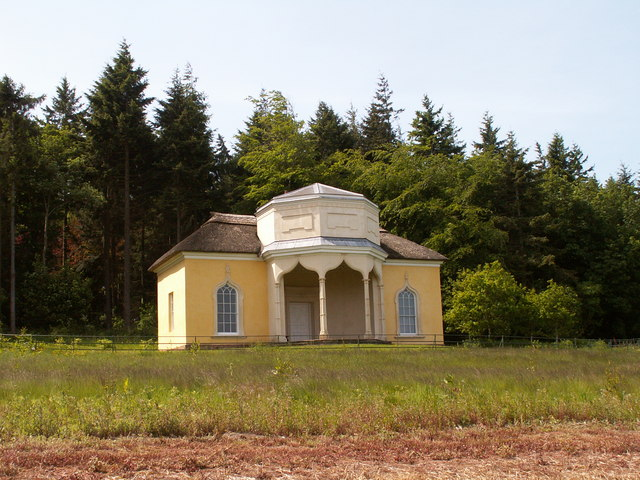
Robin Hood's Hut

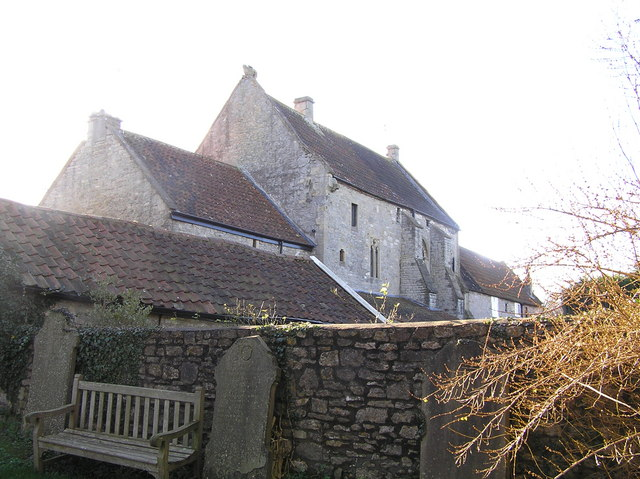
Saltford Manor House

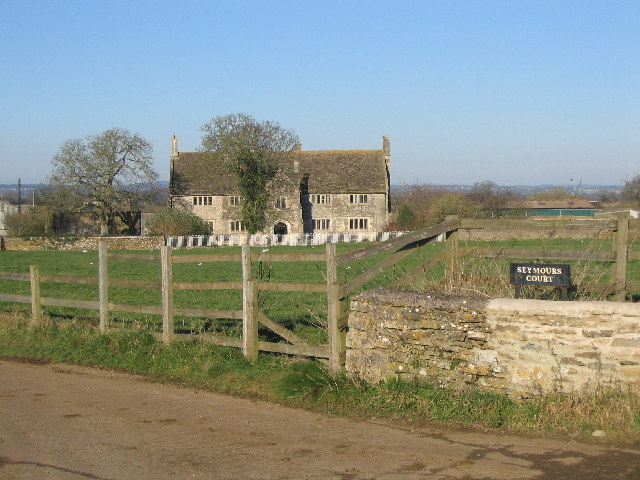
Seymours Court Farmhouse, Beckington

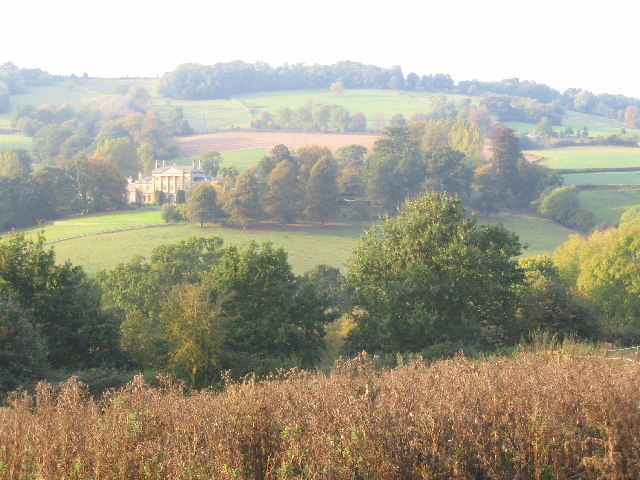
Shockerwick House

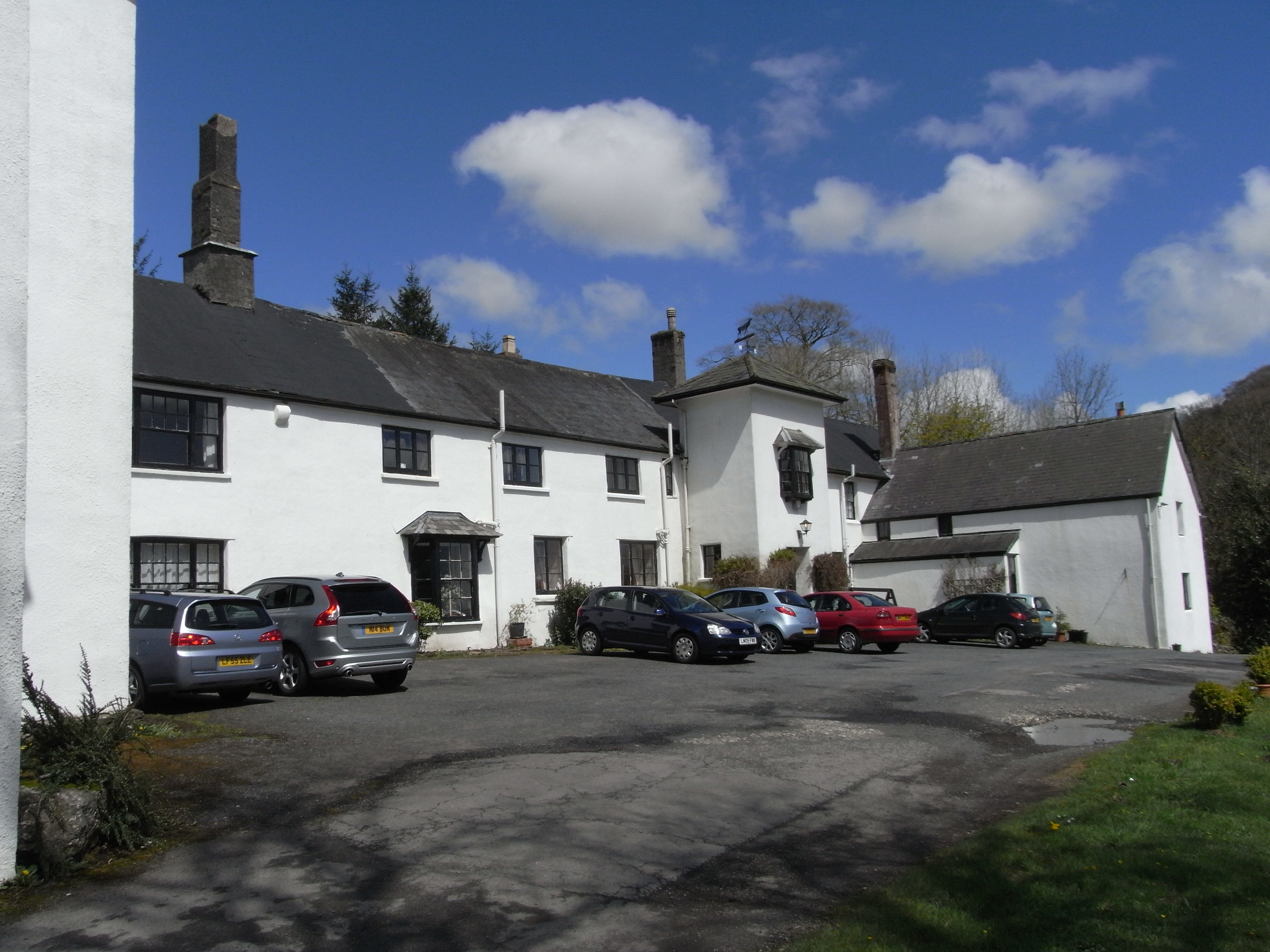
Simonsbath House

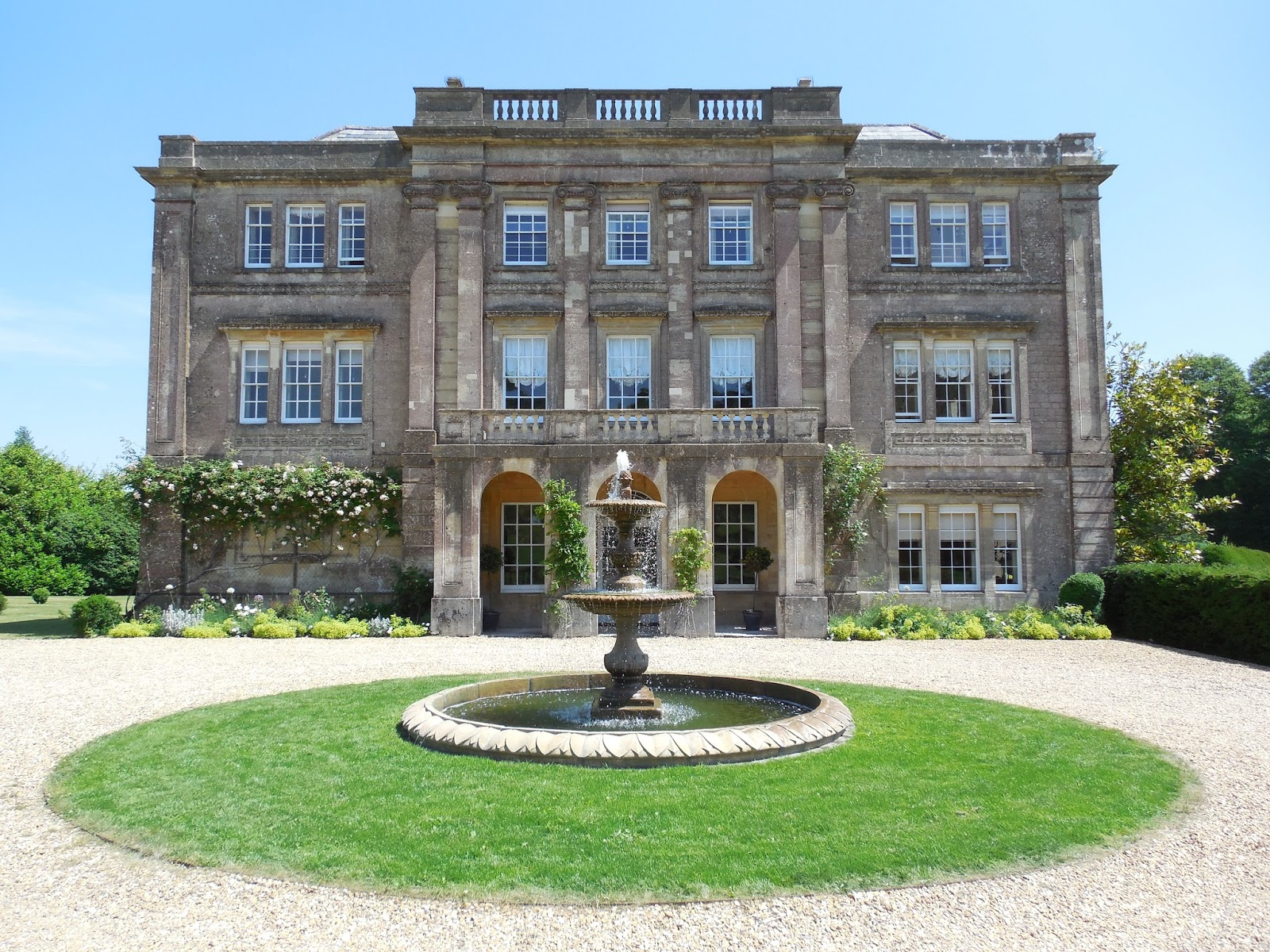
Southill House, Cranmore

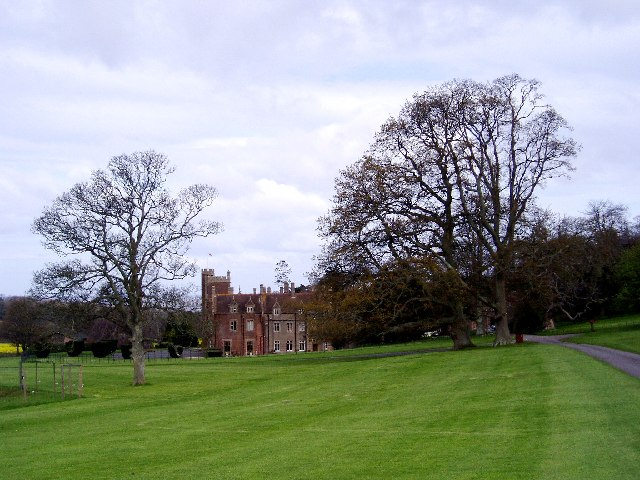
St Audries Park

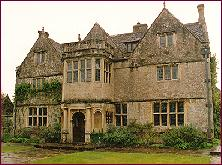
St Catherine's Court

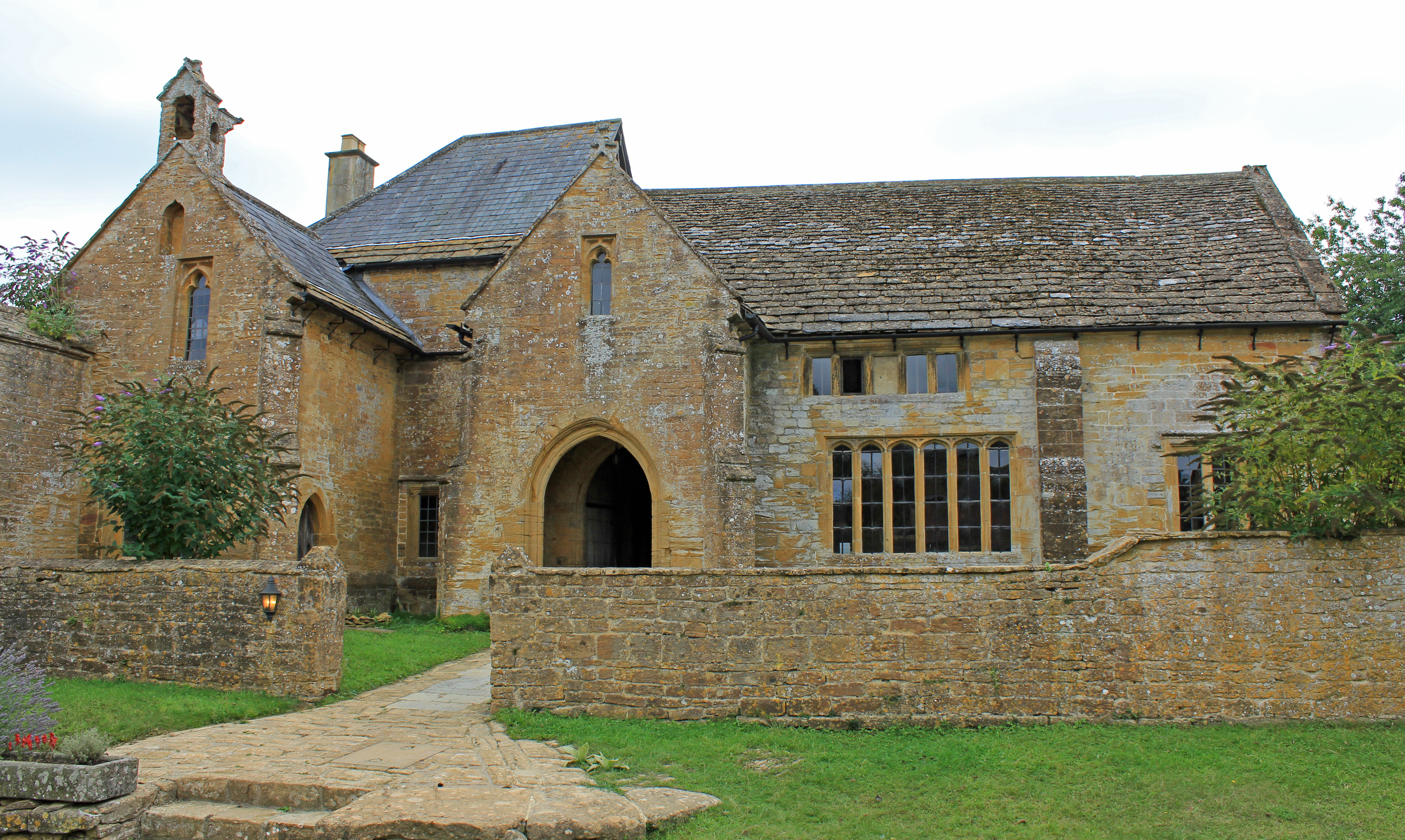
Stoke sub Hamdon Priory

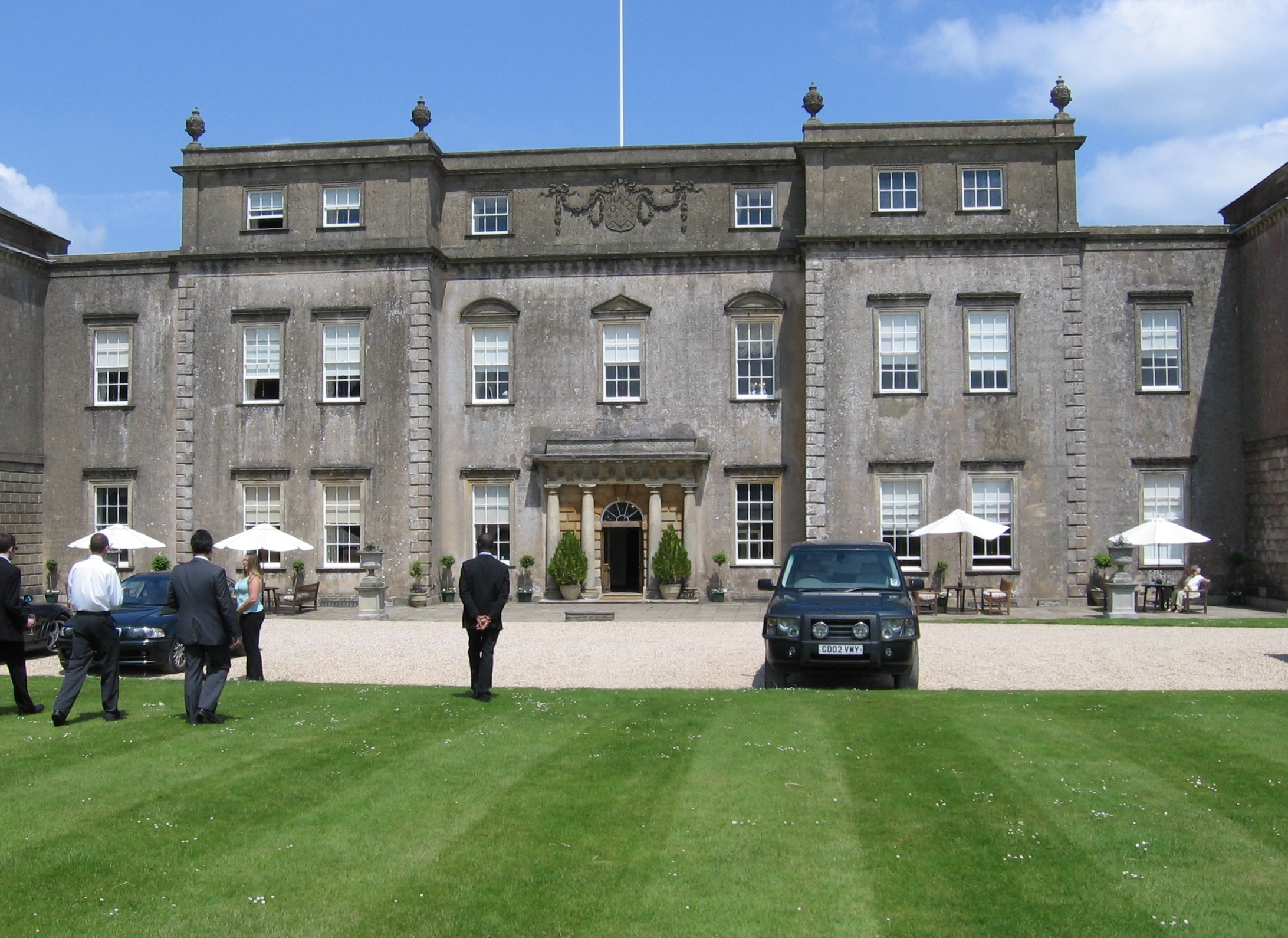
Ston Easton Park

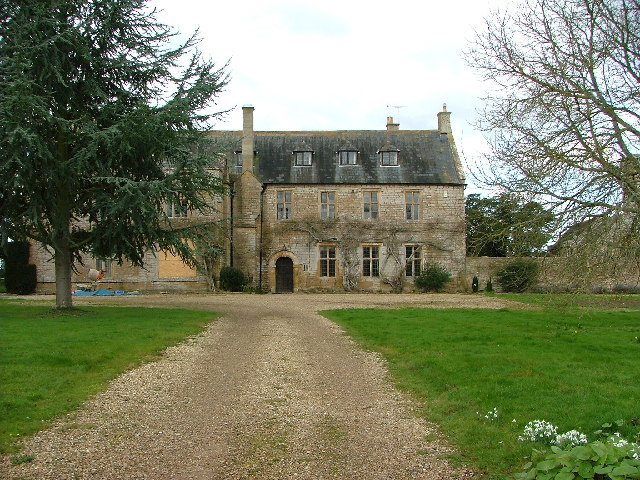
Tintinhull Court

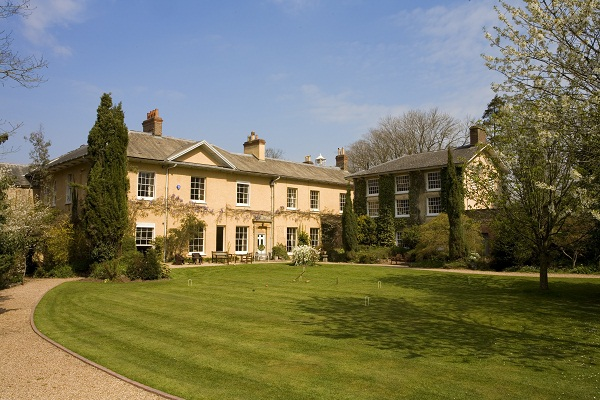
Tone Dale House

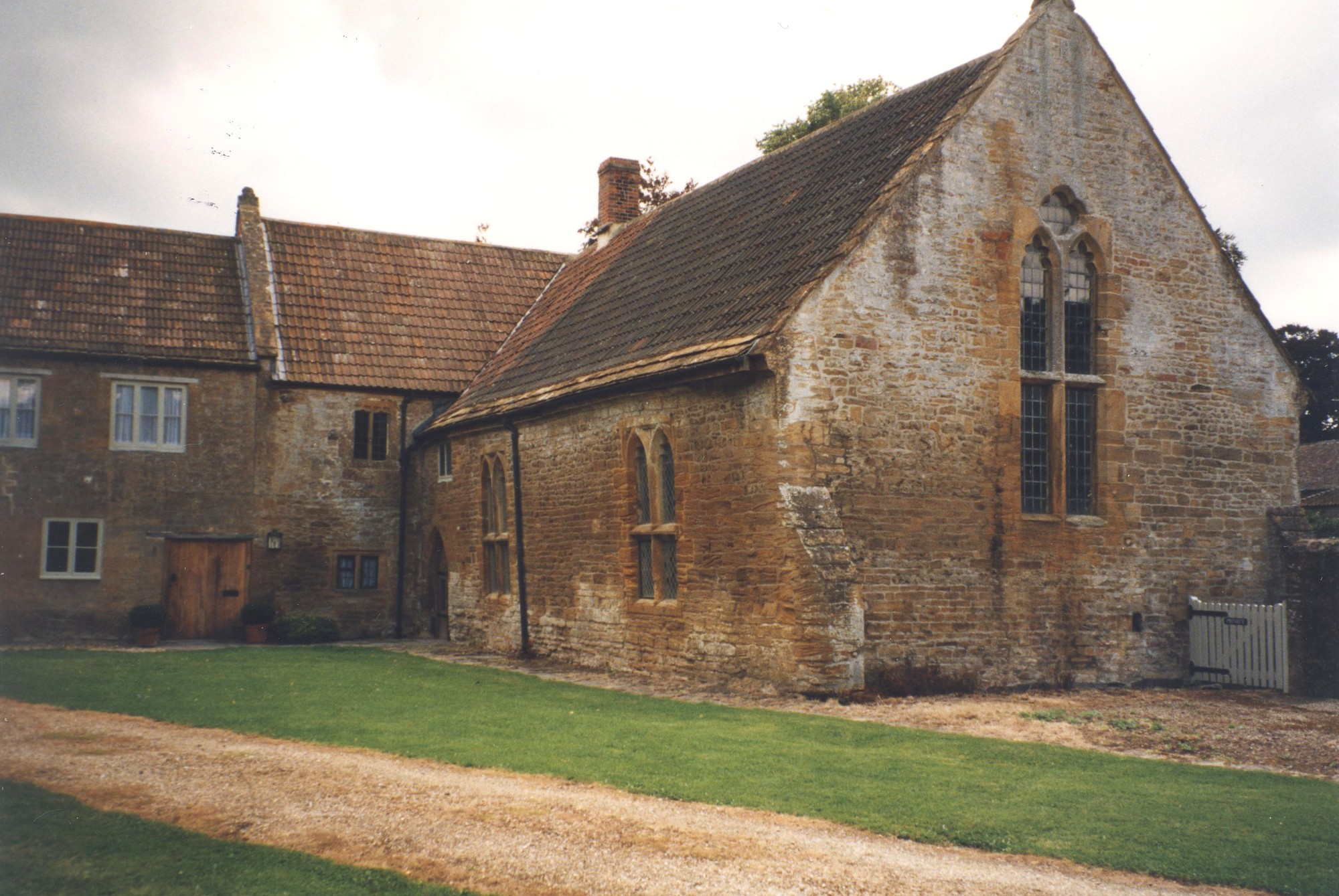
Treasurer's House

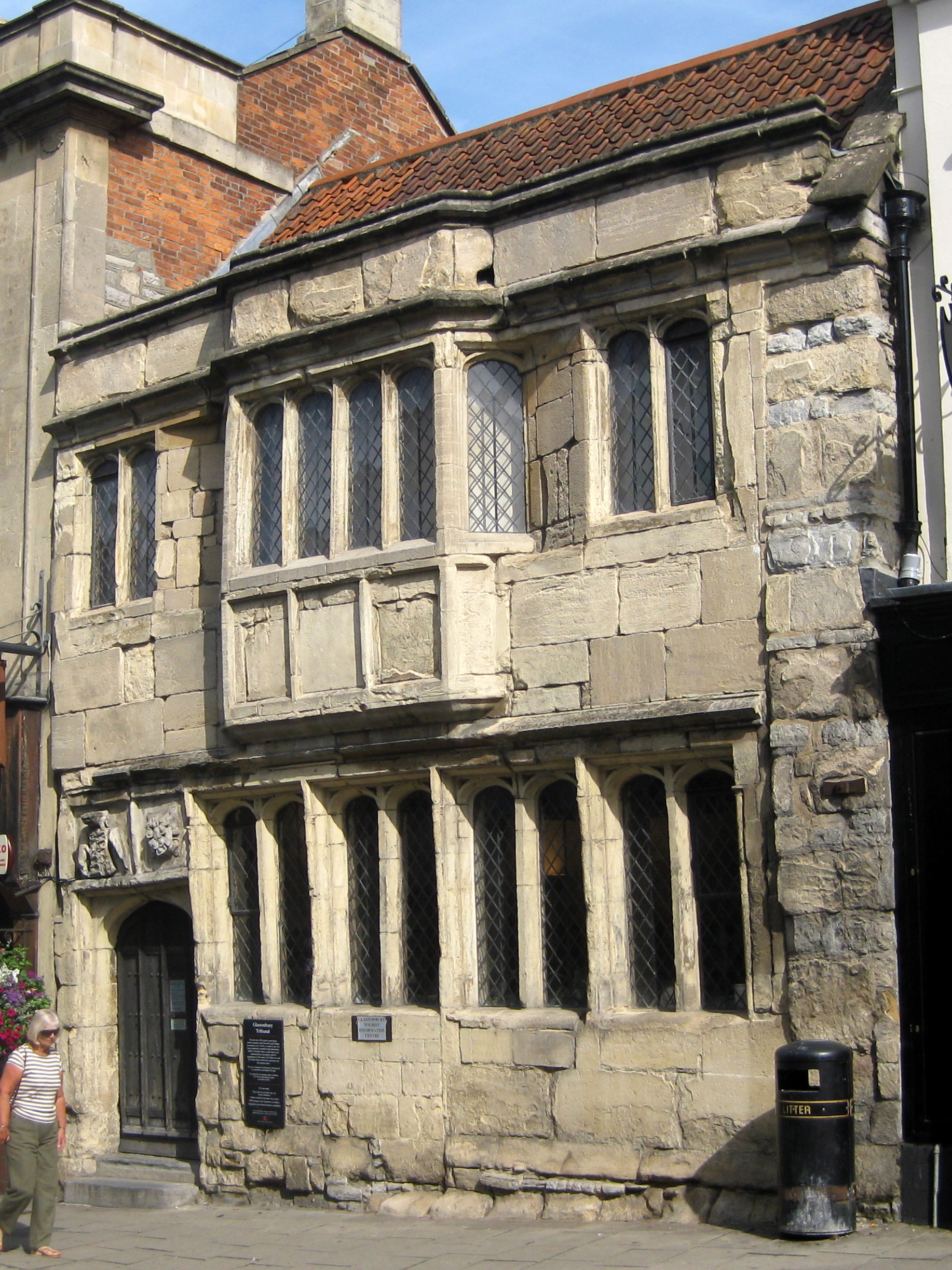
The Tribunal, Glastonbury

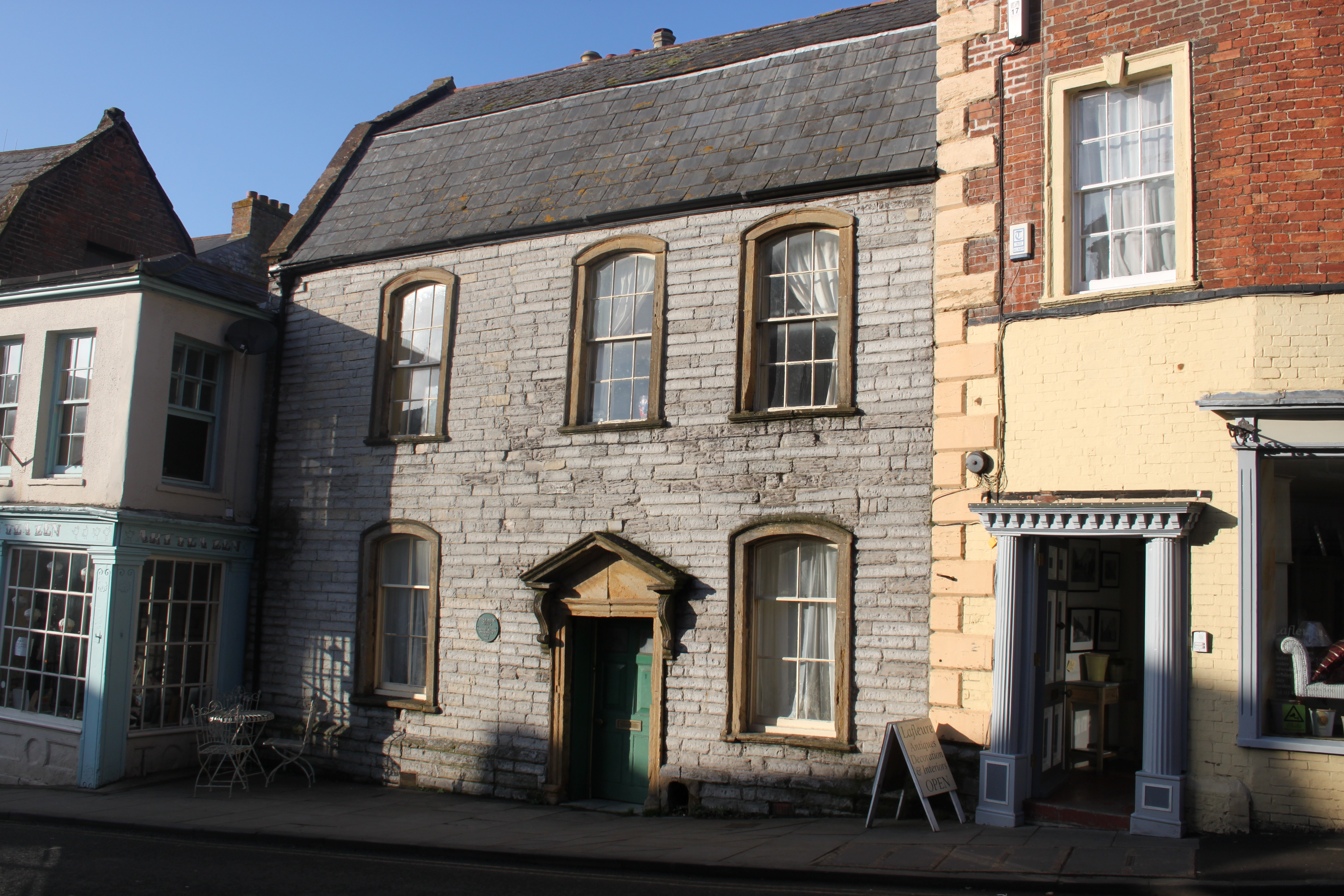
Tudor House, Langport

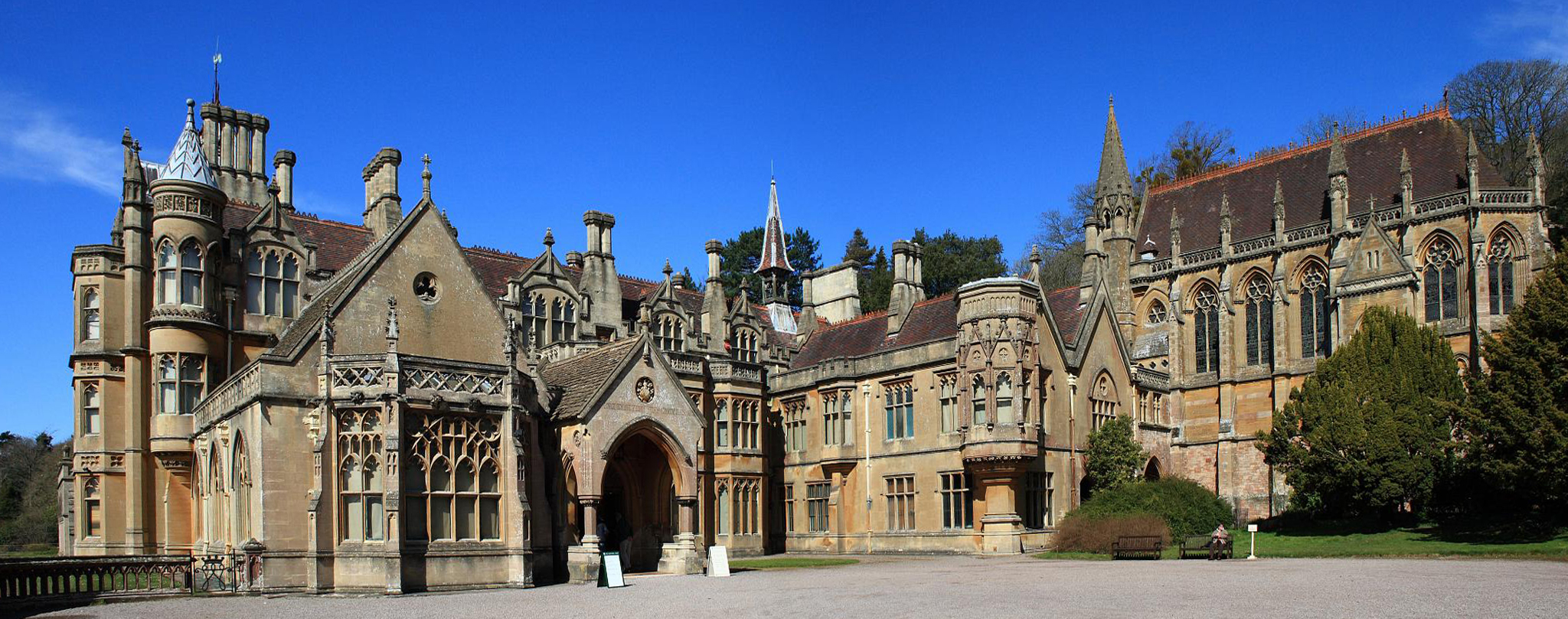
Tyntesfield

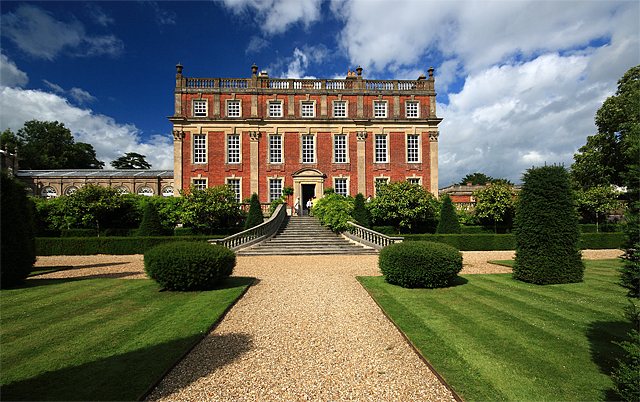
Ven House

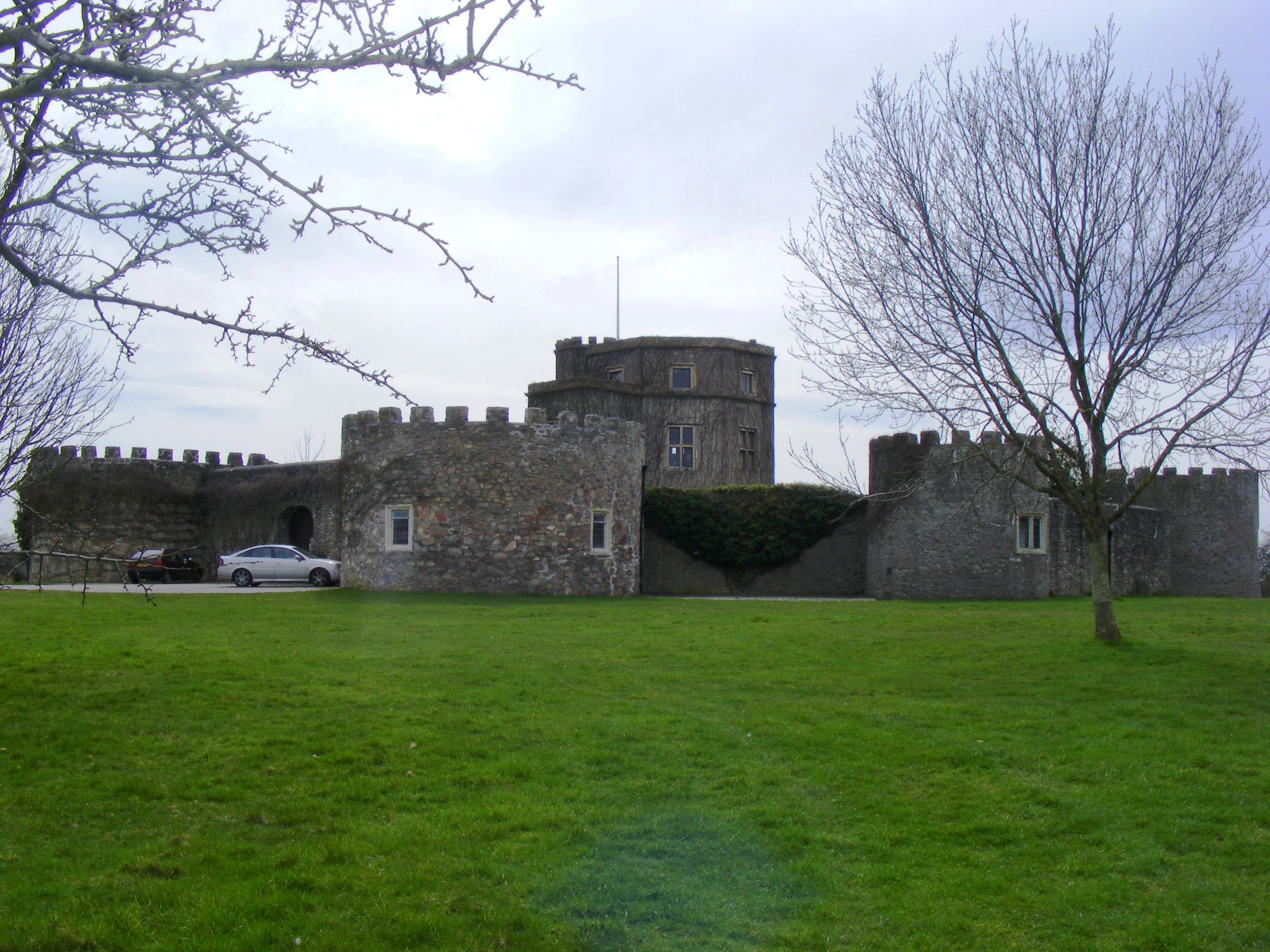
Walton Castle

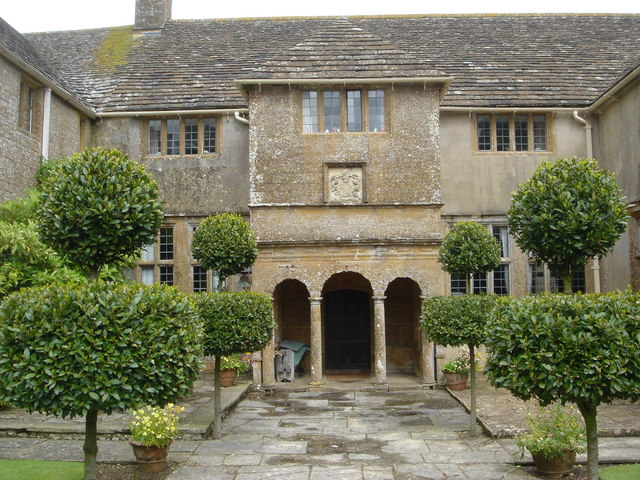
Wayford Manor House

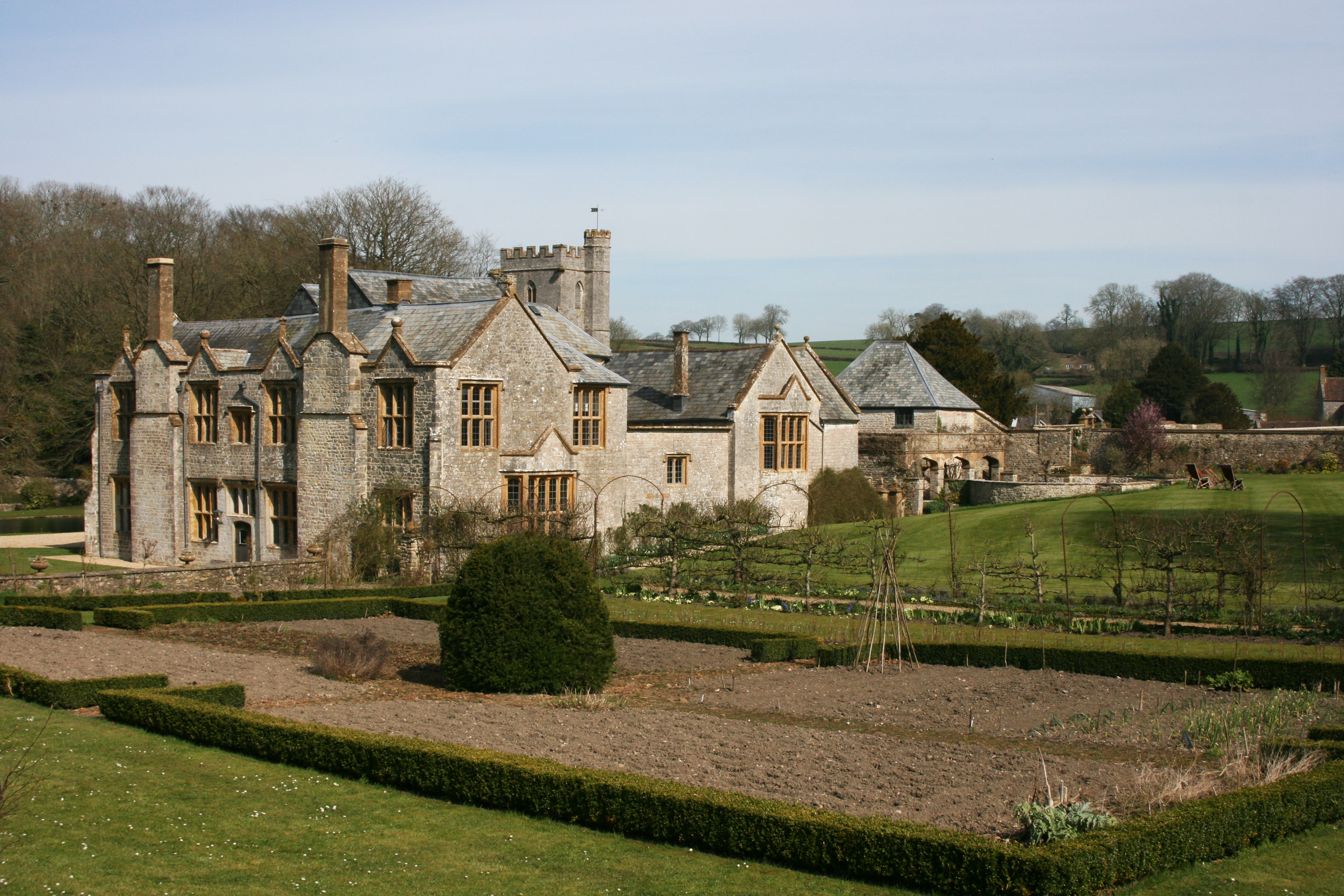
Whitestaunton Manor

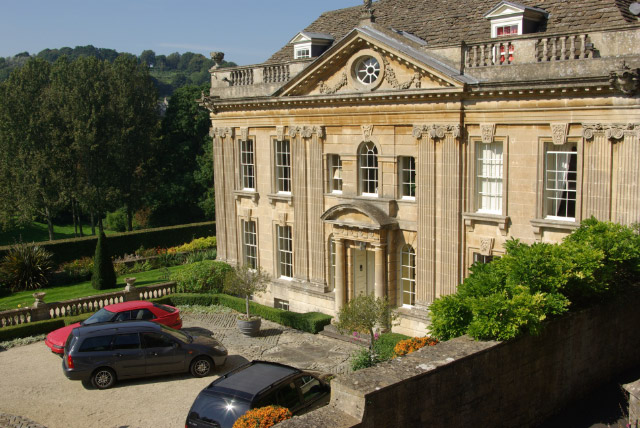
Widcombe Manor House

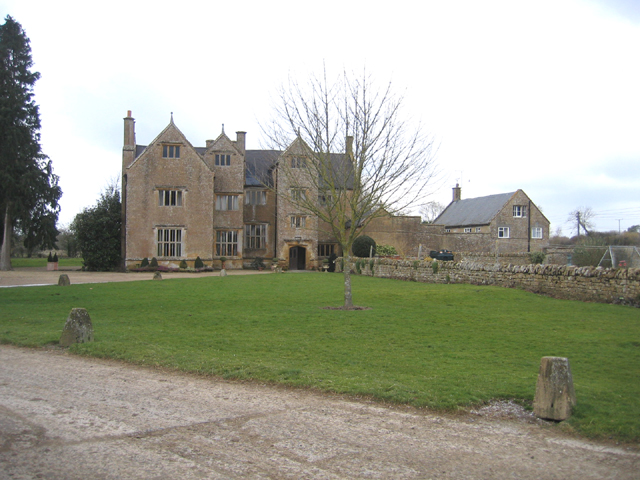
Wigborough Manor House

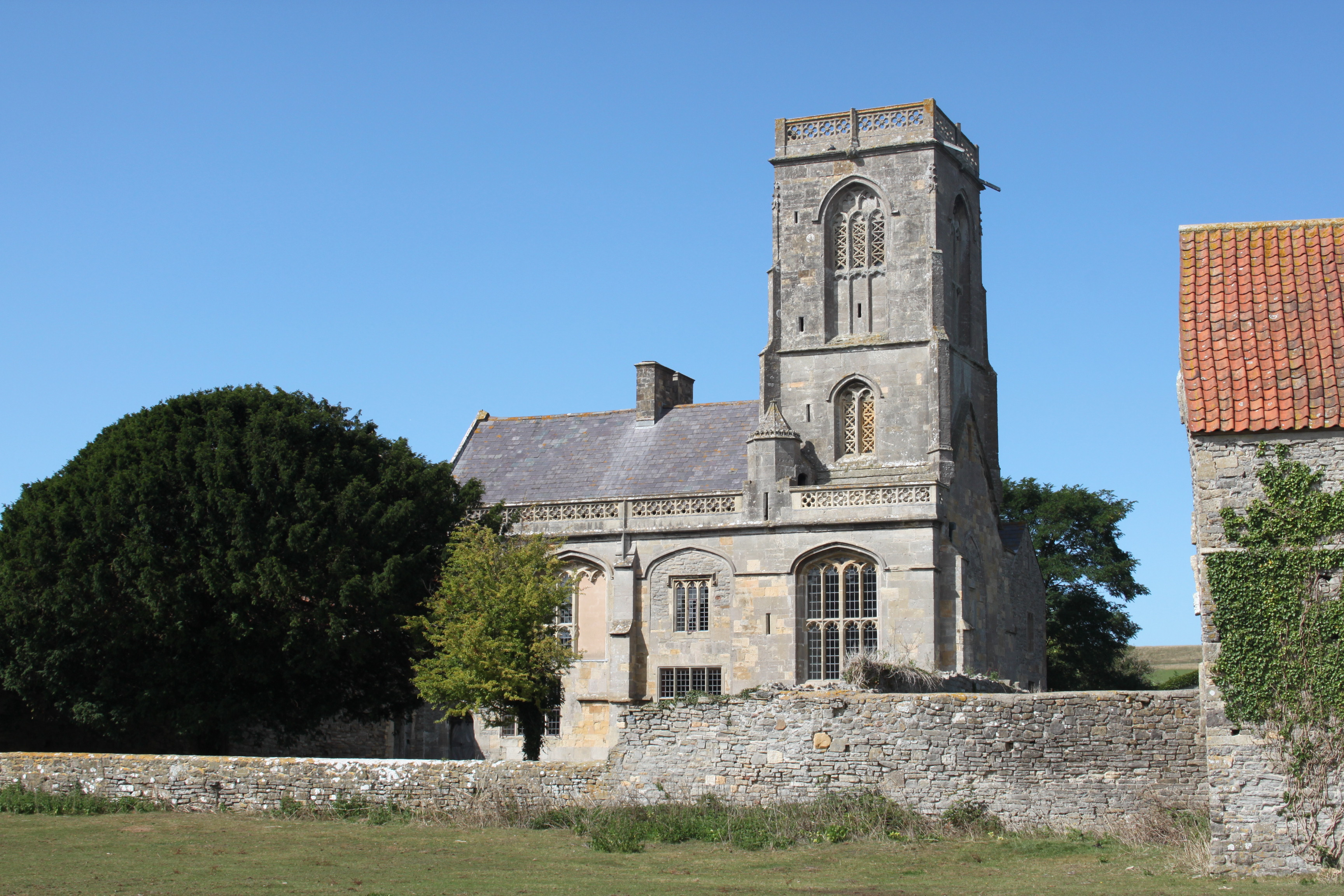
Woodspring Priory

=== South Yorkshire ===
- Aston Hall
- Banner Cross Hall
- Barnes Hall
- Birley Old Hall
- Bishops' House
- Brodsworth Hall
- Broom Hall
- Burntwood Hall
- Burrowlee House
- Cannon Hall
- Cantley Hall
- Carbrook Hall
- Cusworth Hall
- Dial House
- Endcliffe Hall
- Fulwood Hall
- Hallfield House
- Hatfield Manor House
- Hickleton Hall
- Hillsborough House
- Hooton Pagnell Hall
- Houndhill
- Leader House
- Loxley House
- Mount Pleasant
- Mylnhurst
- Norton Hall
- Oakes Park
- Old Bank House
- Onesacre Hall
- Parkhead Hall
- Queen's Tower
- Revell Grange
- Riverdale House
- Roche Abbey
- Sandbeck Hall
- Sheffield Manor
- Sprotbrough House (demolished)
- Stumperlowe Hall
- Sugworth Hall
- Swinden House
- Tapton Hall
- The Mount, Sheffield
- The Towers
- Thornbury
- Wadworth Hall
- Wentworth Castle
- Wentworth Woodhouse
- Whirlow Hall
- Whitley Hall
- Whiteley Wood Hall (demolished)
- Wortley Hall

=== Staffordshire ===
- Abbey House, Ranton (ruined)
- Alton Castle
- Alton Towers
- Ancient High House
- Apedale Hall
- Aqualate Hall
- Ashcombe Park
- Barlaston Hall
- Beamhurst Hall
- Beaudesert (house) (demolished)
- Betley Court
- Betley Hall (demolished)
- Biddulph Grange
- Blithfield Hall
- Broughton Hall
- Calwich Abbey (demolished)
- Caverswall Castle
- Chillington Hall
- Croxall Hall
- Drayton Manor
- Dovecliff Hall
- Dunstall Hall
- Dunsley Hall
- Elmhurst Hall
- Enville Hall
- Erasmus Darwin House
- Etruria Hall
- Ford Green Hall
- Forton Hall
- Grendon Hall, Atherstone (demolished)
- Hagley Hall, Rugeley (demolished)
- Hanch Hall
- Haselour Hall
- The Heath House
- Himley Hall
- Hoar Cross Hall
- Ilam Park
- Ingestre Hall
- Knypersley Hall
- Madeley Old Hall
- Maer Hall
- Manley Hall (demolished)
- Milford Hall
- Moseley Old Hall
- Packington Hall
- Patshull Hall
- Rolleston Hall (demolished)
- Sandon Hall
- Seighford Hall
- Shugborough Hall
- Somerford Hall
- Stallington Hall (ruined)
- Statfold Hall
- Stourton Castle
- Stretton Hall
- Swynnerton Hall
- Teddesley Hall
- The Villas
- The Wodehouse
- Thornbury Hall
- Thorpe Constantine Hall
- Throwley Old Hall (ruined)
- Tixall House (demolished except Gatehouse)
- Trentham Gardens (demolished/ruined)
- Turnhurst
- Weston Hall (Staffs)
- Weston Park
- Westwood Hall
- Whitmore Hall
- Whittington Old Hall
- Wolseley Hall (demolished)
- Wootton Lodge
- Wrottesley Hall
- Wychnor Hall

=== Suffolk ===
- Abbas Hall
- Acton Place (demolished)
- Ampton Hall
- Ancient House, Clare
- Ancient House, Ipswich
- Angel Corner
- Assington Hall (demolished)
- Barking Hall (demolished)
- Barton Hall (demolished)
- Bawdsey Manor
- Benacre Hall
- Benhall Lodge
- Bidenly Hall
- Boulge Hall (demolished)
- Brampton Hall
- Branches Park (demolished)
- Bredfield House (demolished)
- Brettenham Park
- Bridge Cottage
- Brightwell Hall (demolished)
- Brome Hall (demolished)
- Manor of Byng
- Campsea Ashe High House (demolished)
- Carlton Hall (demolished)
- Cavenham Hall (demolished)
- Chediston Hall
- Christchurch Mansion
- Cockfield Hall
- Coldham Hall
- Cotton Hall
- Culford Park
- Dalham Hall
- Desning Hall
- Downham Hall (demolished)
- Drinkstone Park (demolished)
- Easton Park (demolished)
- Edwardstone Hall (demolished)
- Euston Hall
- Finborough Hall
- Flixton Hall (demolished)
- Fornham Hall (demolished)
- Gainsborough's House
- Gipping Hall
- Glemham Hall
- Glevering Hall
- Great Glemham House
- Grimston Hall, Suffolk
- Hardwick House (demolished)
- Haughley Park
- Helmingham Hall
- Hengrave Hall
- Henham Park (demolished)
- Henstead House
- Heveningham Hall
- Hintlesham Hall
- Hobland Hall (demolished)
- Holton Hall (demolished)
- Hunston Hall (demolished)
- Hurt's Hall
- Ickworth House
- Kentwell Hall
- Lawshall Hall
- Livermere Hall (demolished)
- Great Livermere Hall (replaced livermere hall listed above)
- Melford Hall
- Mildenhall Manor (demolished)
- Morpeth House
- Moulton Paddocks (demolished)
- Nether Hall
- Newe House
- Oakley Park (demolished)
- Ousden Hall (demolished)
- Otley Hall
- Pakenham Hall (demolished)
- Parham Hall
- Plashwood
- The Priory
- Redgrave Hall (demolished)
- Red House, Ipswich (demolished)
- Rendlesham Hall (demolished)
- Rougham Hall (demolished)
- Rushbrooke Hall (demolished)
- Shrubland Park
- Sizewell Hall
- Smallbridge Hall
- Somerleyton Hall
- Sotterley Hall
- Stoke Park (demolished)
- Sudbourne Hall (demolished)
- Tendring Hall (demolished)
- Thorington Hall (demolished)
- Thornham Hall (demolished)
- Ufford Place
- Westhorpe Hall
- Willy Lott's Cottage
- Wingfield Castle
- Wingfield College
- Woolverstone Hall
- Worlingham Hall
- Worlington Hall
- Wrentham Hall (demolished)
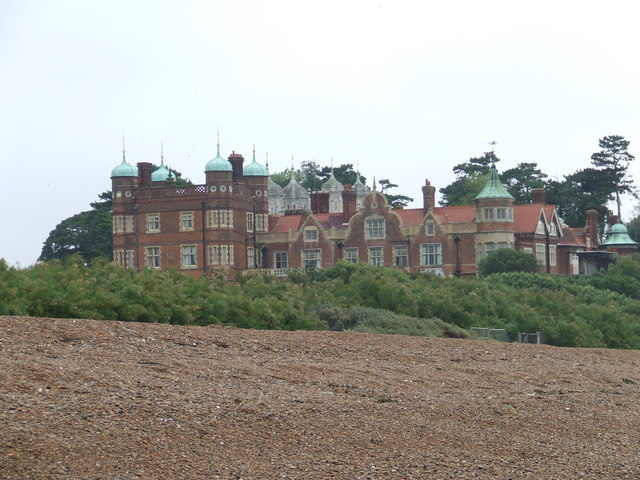
Bawdsey Manor

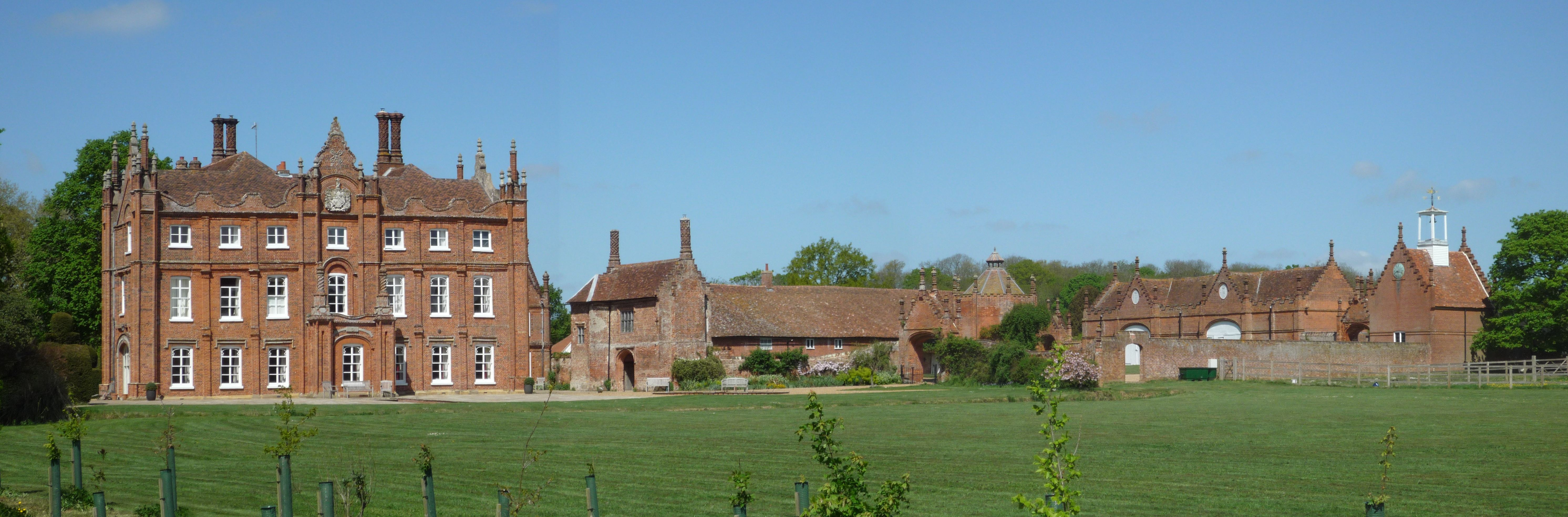
Cockfield Hall

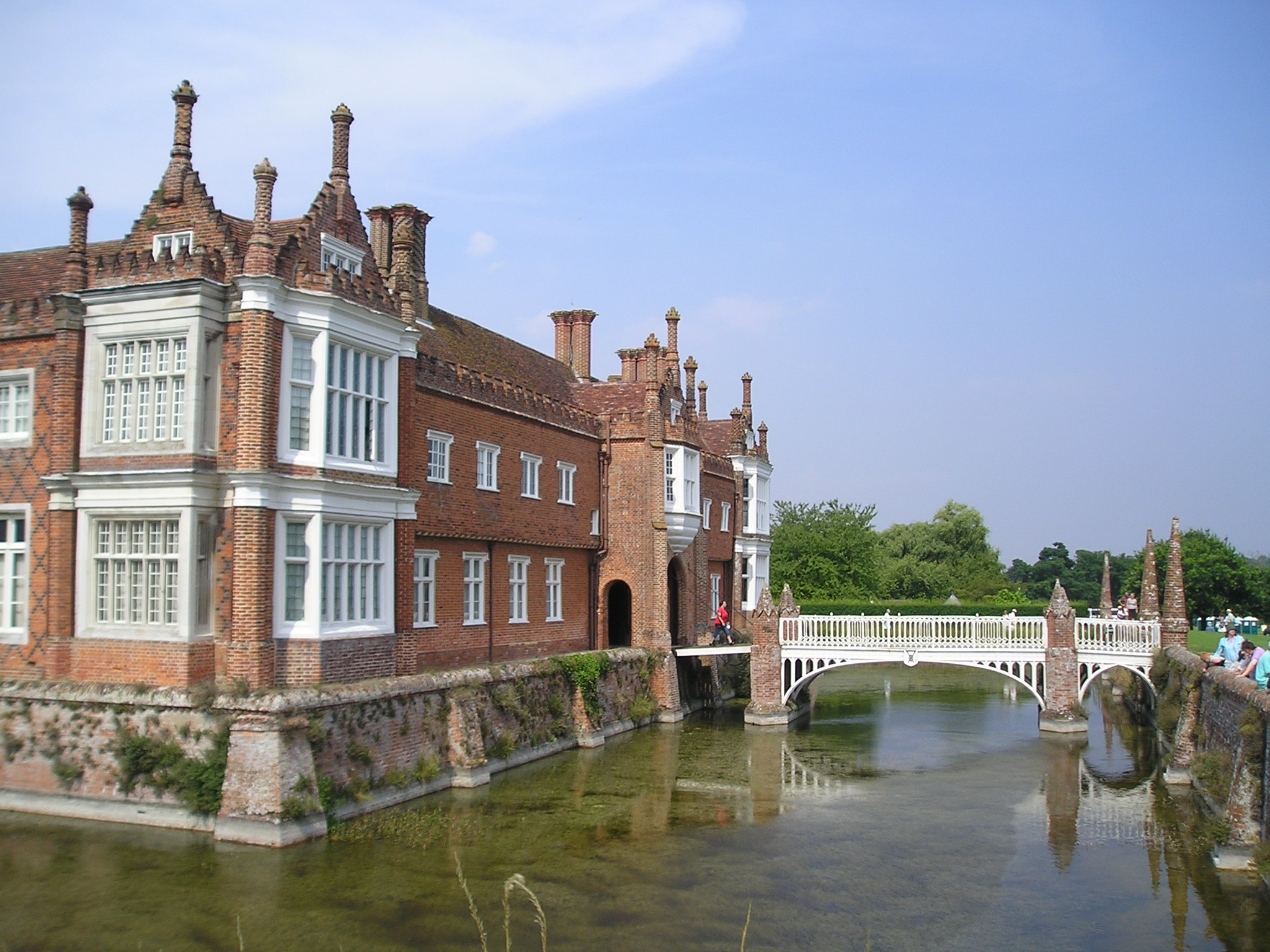
Helmingham Hall

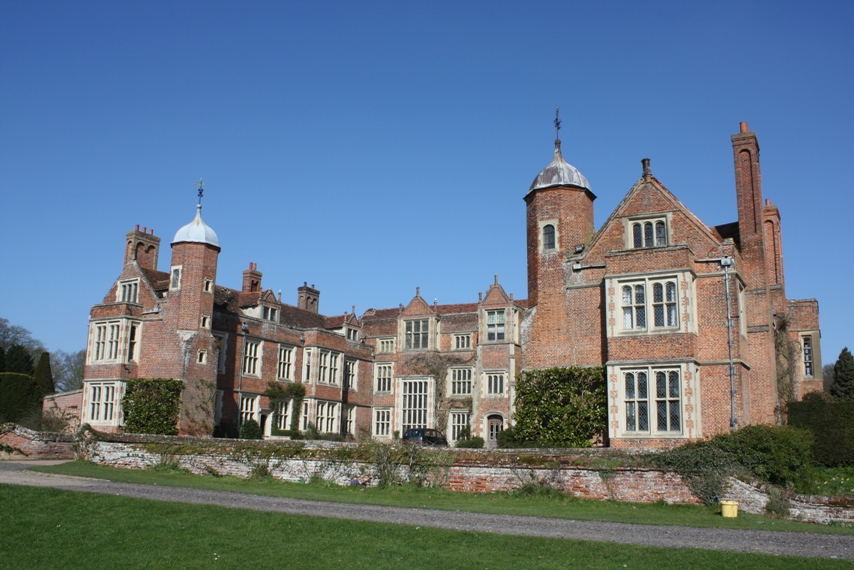
Kentwell Hall

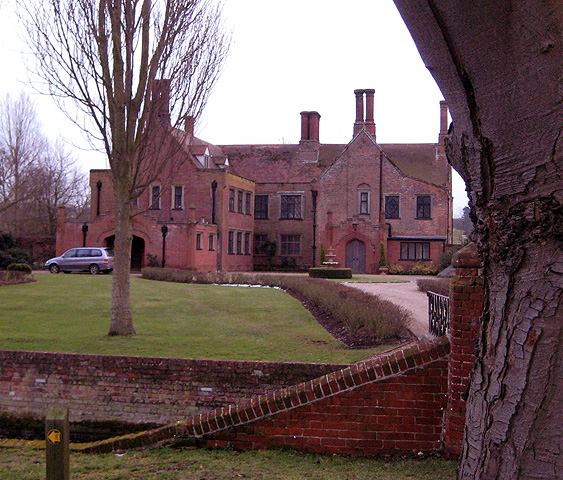
Smallbridge Hall

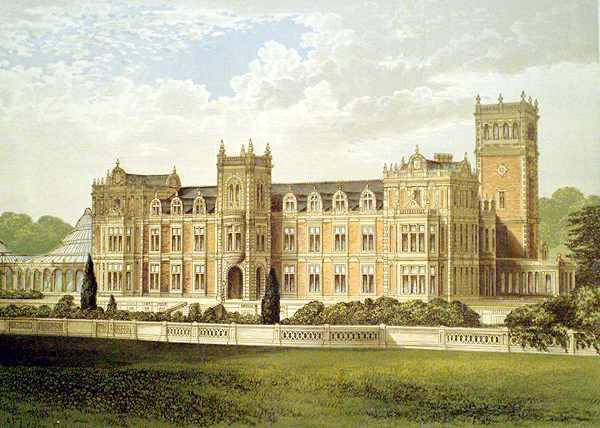
Somerleyton Hall

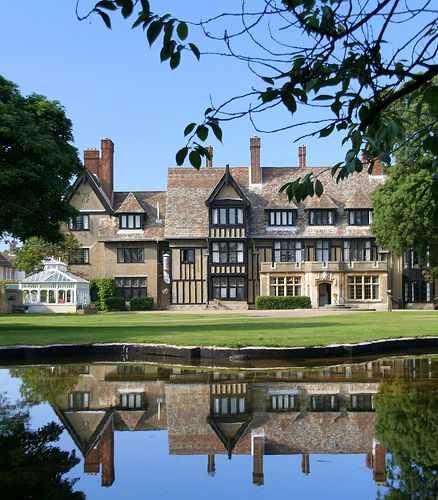
Sizewell Hall

=== Surrey ===
- Albury Park
- Bagshot Park
- Banstead Wood
- Benjamin Manor Park
- Botleys Mansion
- Boyle Farm
- Cain Manor
- Cherkley Court
- Clandon House
- Claremont
- Cobham Park
- Deepdene House and Gardens
- Denbies
- Denbies Wine Estate
- Detillens
- Eastley End House
- Fetcham Park House
- Fort Belvedere
- Goddards
- Great Fosters
- Guildford House
- Hascombe Court
- Hatchlands Park
- Heywood House, Surrey
- Horsley Towers
- Juniper Hall
- Kenwood, St. George's Hill
- Laleham Abbey
- Loseley Park
- Milton Court
- Nonsuch Mansion
- Nonsuch Palace (demolished)
- Oakhurst Cottage
- Oatlands Palace (demolished)
- Peper Harow
- Polesden Lacey
- Portnall Park, Virginia Water
- Ribsden Holt
- Sanderstead Court
- Stanwell Place (demolished, was in Middlesex)
- Sunbury Court
- Sunny Heights
- Sutton Place
- Titsey Place
- Updown Court
- Undershaw
- Windlesham Moor
- Witley Park
- Woking Palace
- Woodcote Park
- Worcester Park House

=== Tyne and Wear ===
- Axwell House
- Birtley Hall (demolished 1916)
- Chirton Hall
- Cleadon Cottage (demolished 1982)
- Corby Hall (demolished 1976)
- Deckham's Hall (demolished 1930)
- Elvaston Hall (demolished)
- Farnacres (demolished)
- Ford Hall (demolished)
- Gateshead Park House (demolished)
- Gibside (partially ruined)
- Gosforth House
- Herrington Hall (demolished 1957)
- Hylton Castle
- Little Usworth Hall (demolished 1910)
- Low Barnes (demolished 1900)
- North Biddick Hall (demolished 1966)
- Pallion (demolished 1901)
- Park Head Hall
- Peareth Hall (largely demolished)
- Ravensworth Castle (ruined)
- Redheugh Hall (demolished 1936)
- Ryton House (demolished)
- Saltwell Hall (demolished 1936)
- Saltwell Towers
- Sheriff Hill Hall (demolished)
- Simonside Hall (demolished)
- Stella Park (demolished)
- Thompson's Hall (demolished)
- Thornhill House (demolished)
- Throckley Hall
- Wallsend Hall
- Washington Old Hall
- Westoe Hall (demolished 1958)
- Whitburn Hall (demolished 1980)
- White House (demolished)
- Winlaton Hall (demolished 1928)
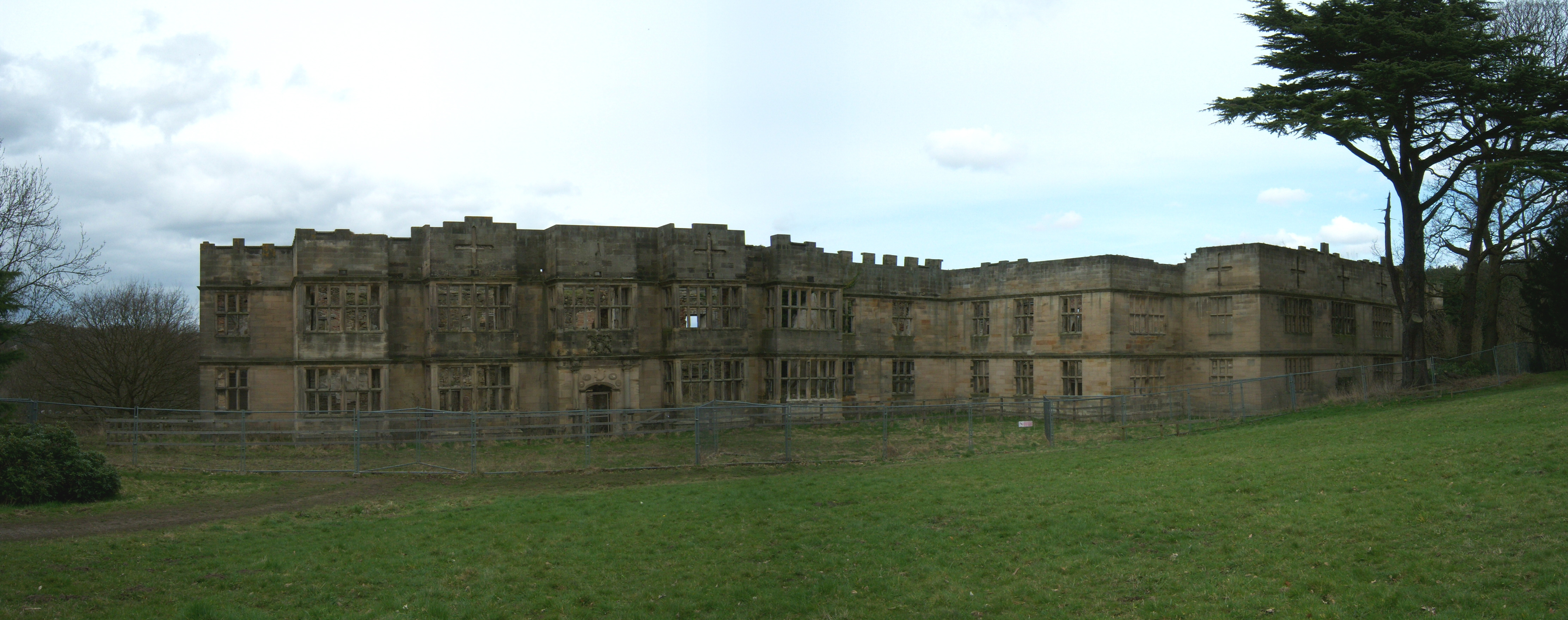
Gibside

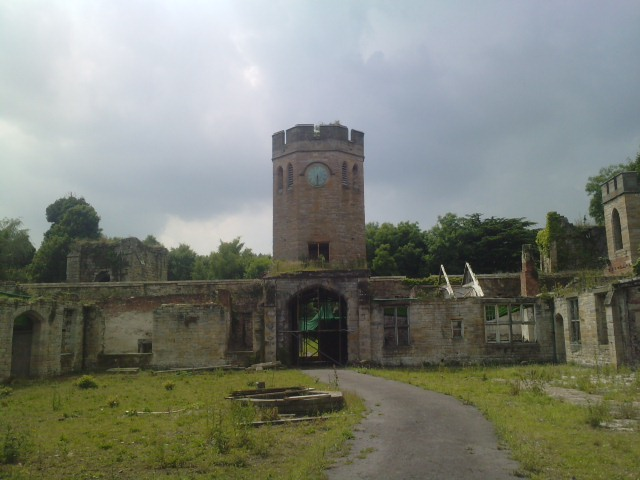
Ravensworth Castle

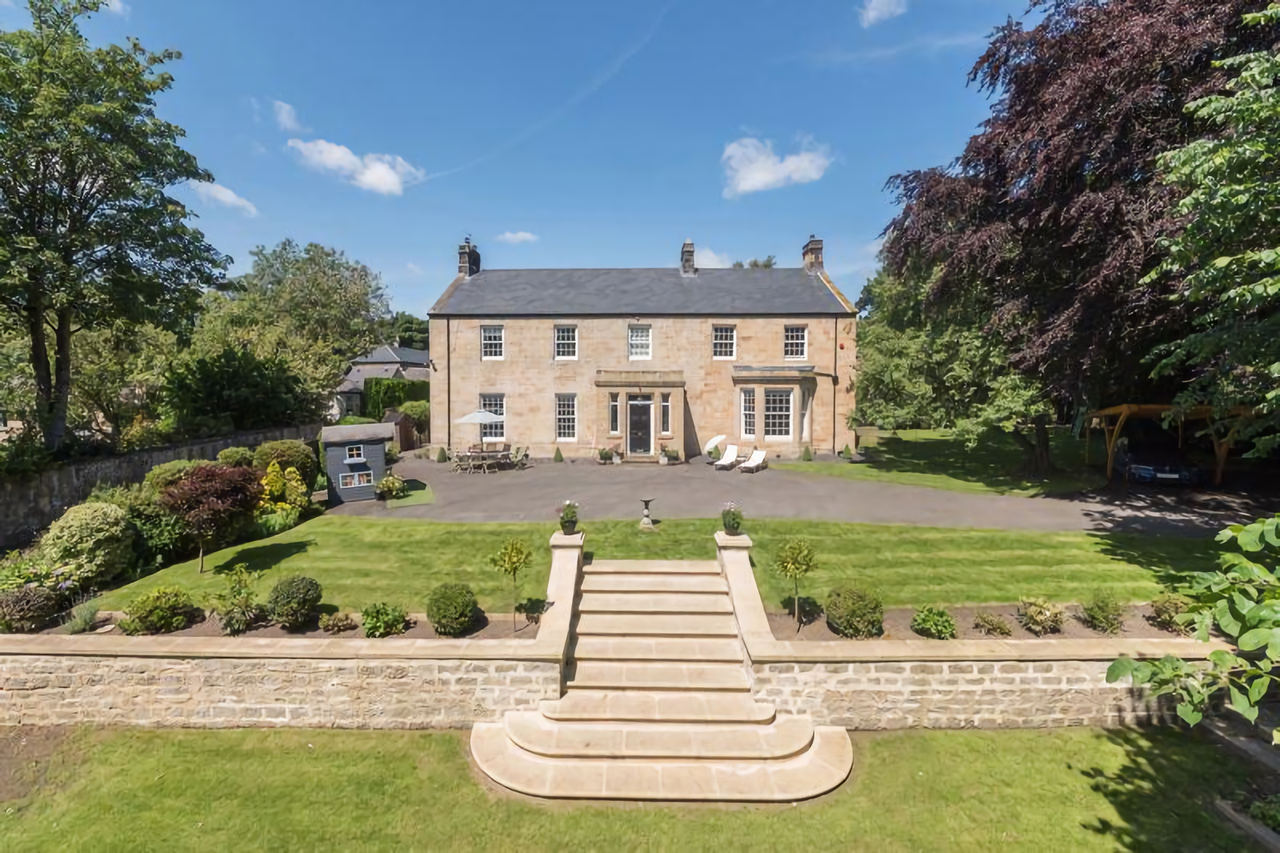
Throckley Hall

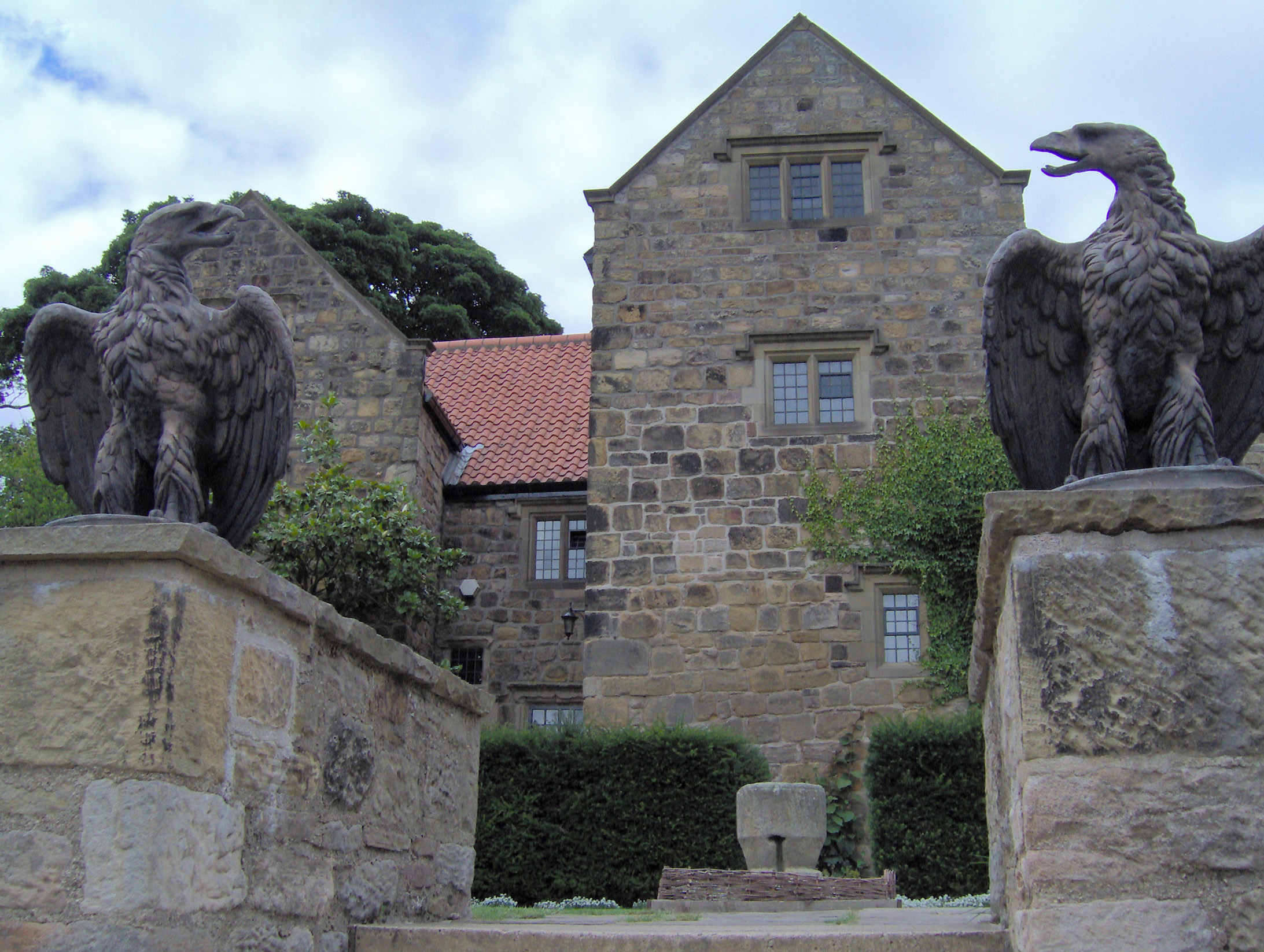
Washington Old Hall

=== Warwickshire ===
- Alscot Park
- Anne Hathaway's Cottage
- Arbury Hall
- Baddesley Clinton
- Barrells Hall
- Brownsover Hall
- Charlecote Park
- Compton Verney House
- Compton Wynyates
- Coombe Abbey
- Coughton Court
- Dunsmore House
- Ettington Park
- Farnborough Hall
- Guy's Cliffe
- Haseley Manor
- Honington Hall
- Kenilworth Castle
- Lord Leycester hospital
- Mary Arden's House
- Maxstoke Castle
- Merevale Hall
- Middleton Hall
- New Place
- Newbold Revel
- Offchurch Bury
- Packwood House
- Ragley Hall
- The Regent Hotel
- Stoneleigh Abbey
- Stoneton Manor
- Upton House
- Walton Hall
- Warwick Castle
- Whateley Hall, Castle Bromwich
- Wolvey Hall
- Wormleighton Manor
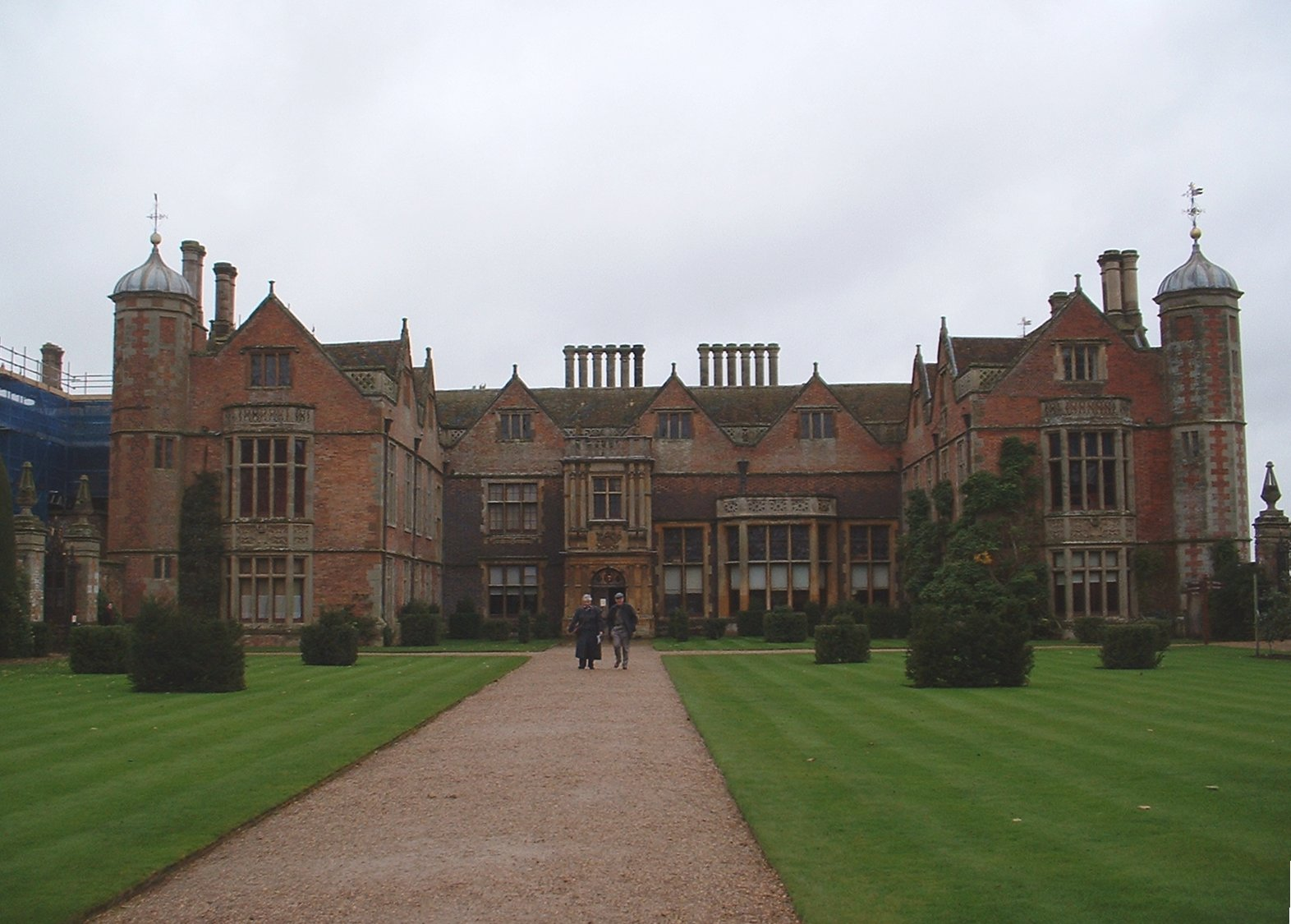
Charlecote Park

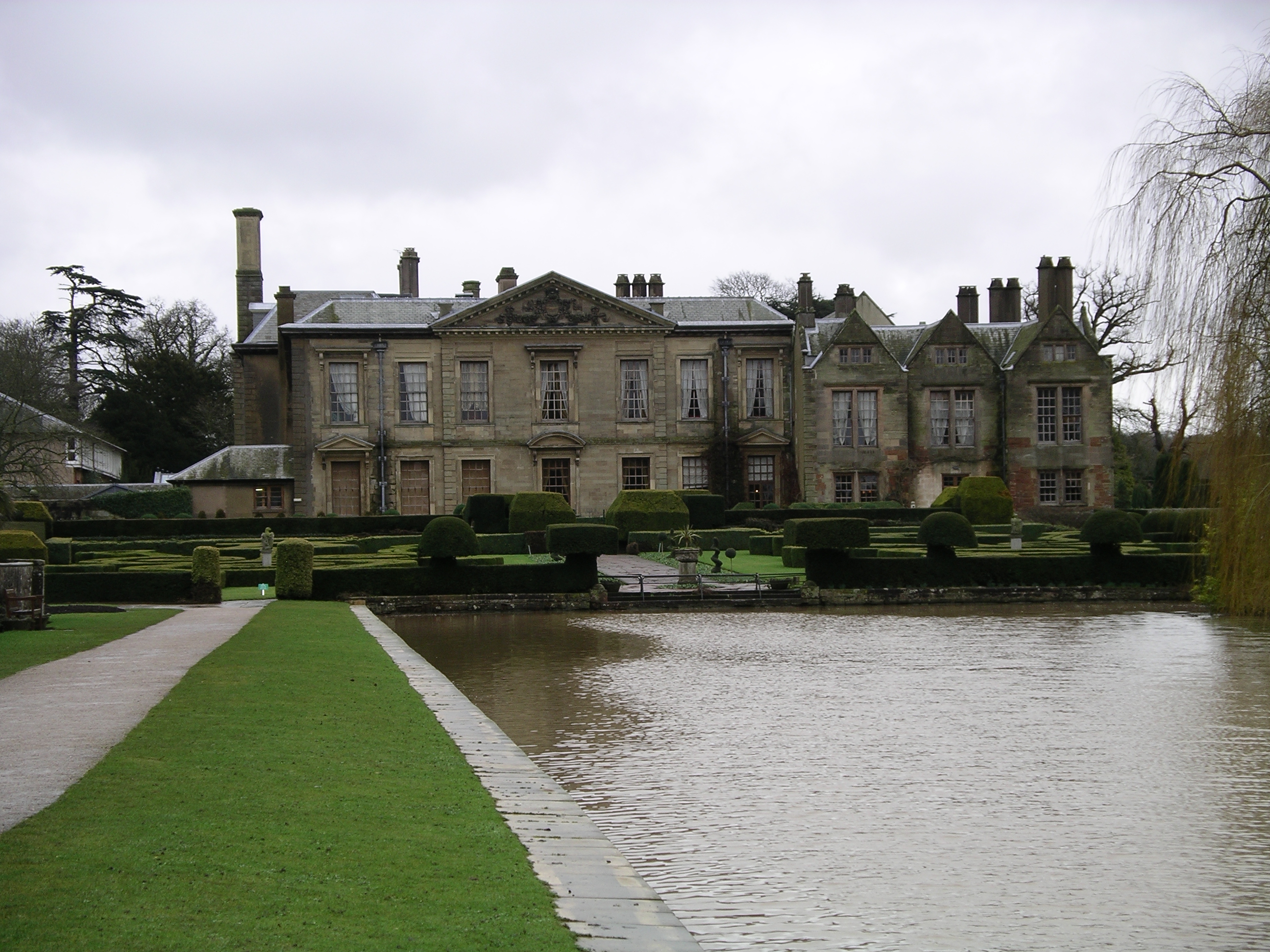
Coombe Abbey

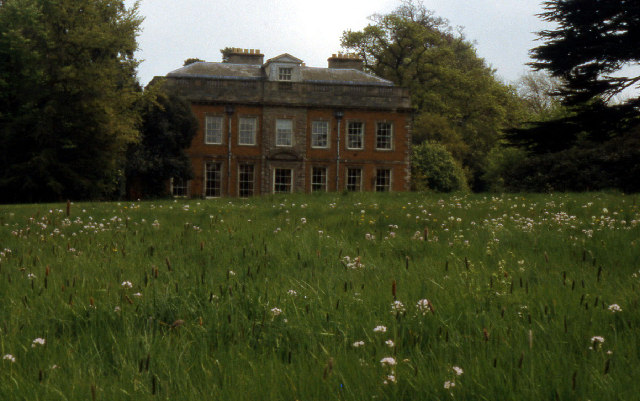
Farnborough Hall

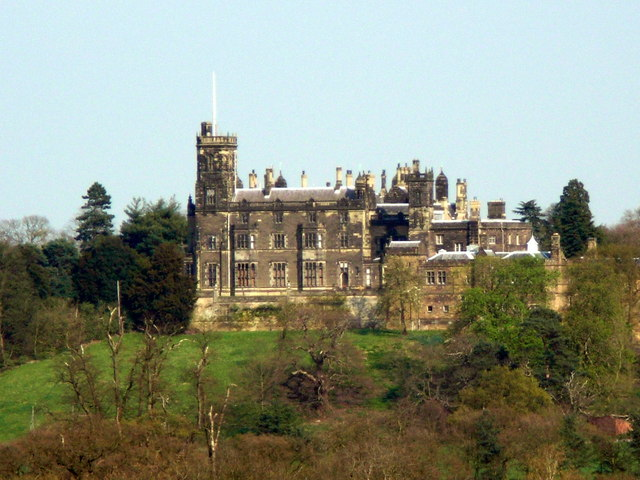
Merevale Hall

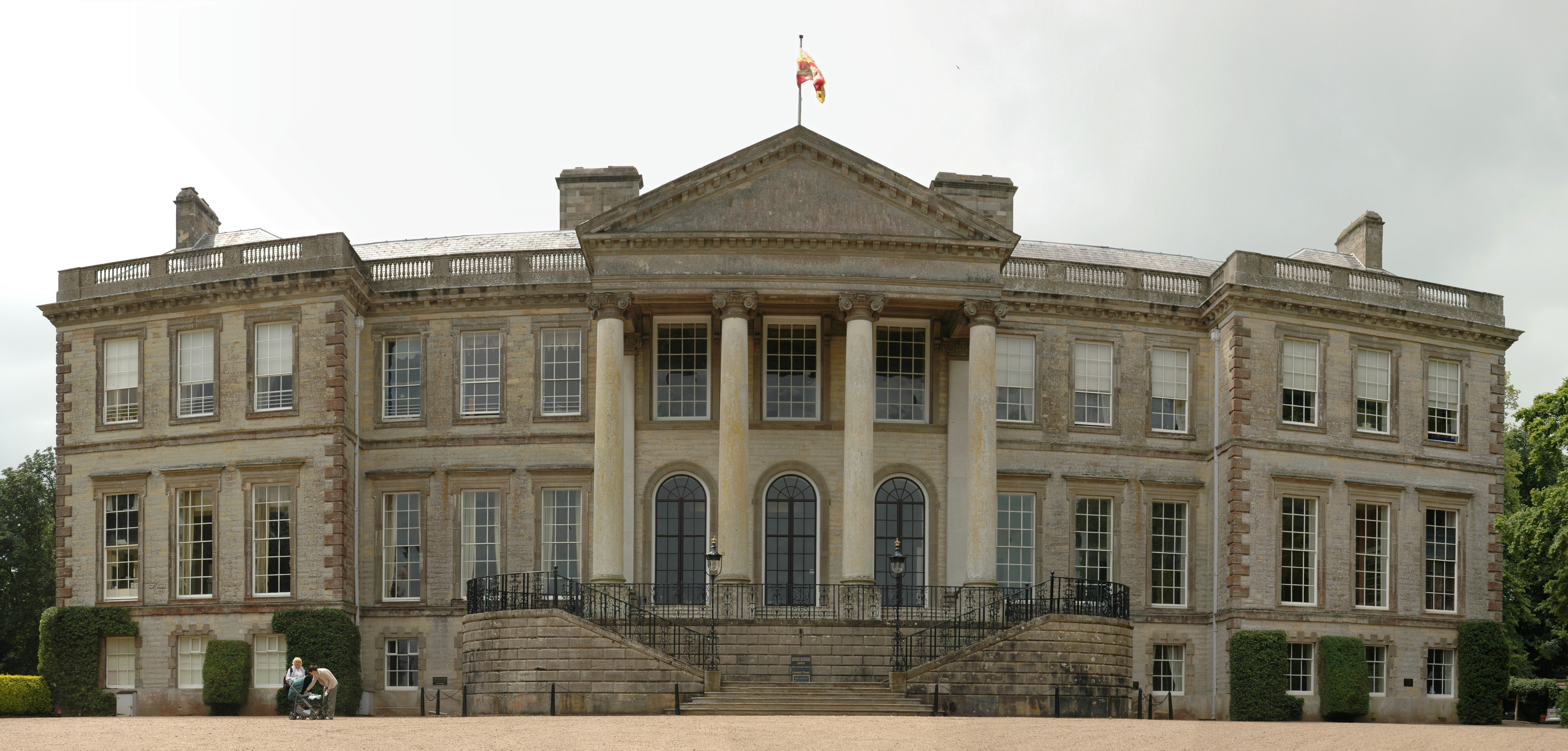
Ragley Hall

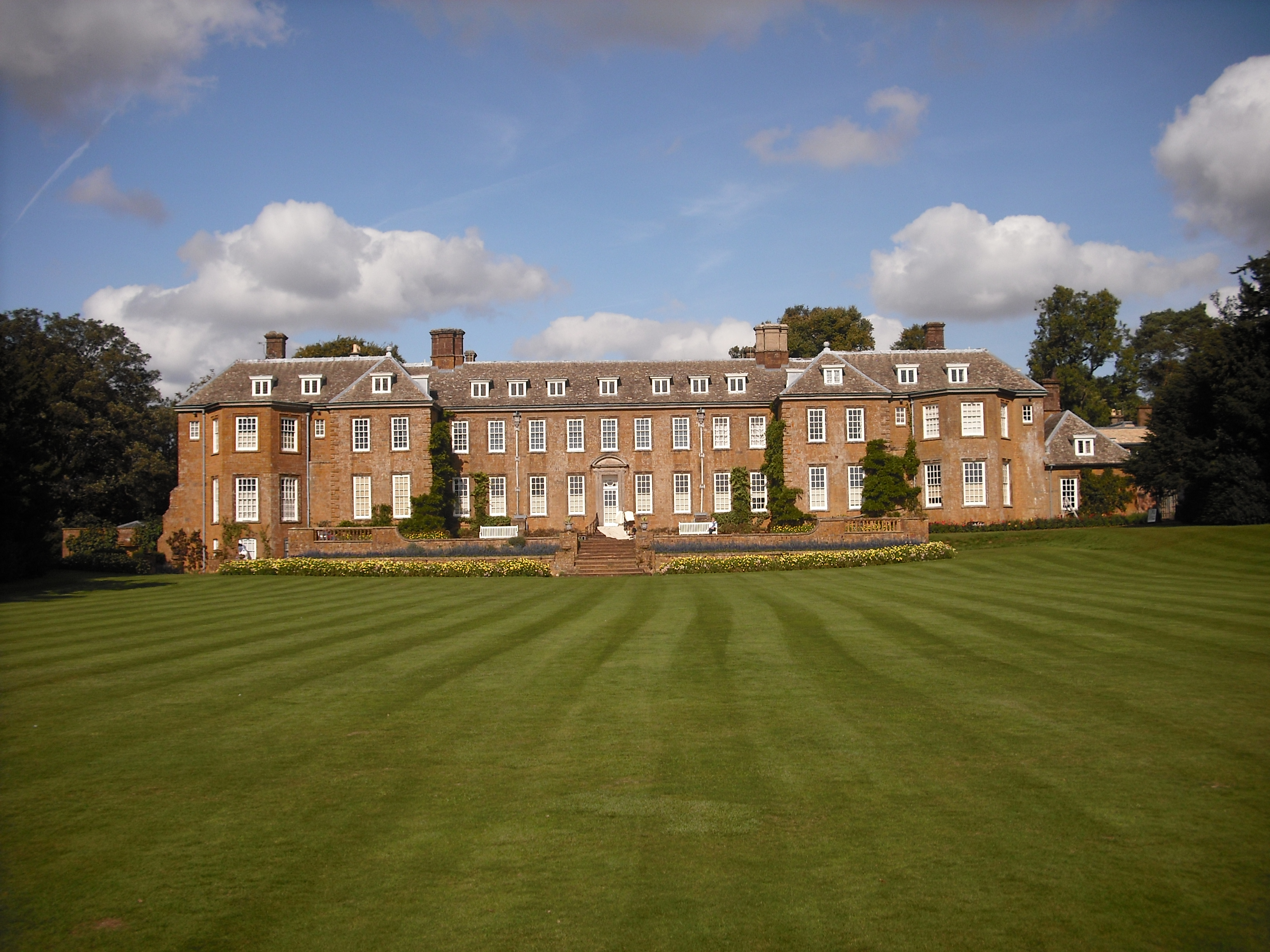
Upton House

=== West Midlands ===
- Aston Hall
- Berry Hall Farm
- Birmingham Back to Backs
- Bishop Asbury Cottage
- Blakesley Hall
- Bordesley Hall, Birmingham (demolished)
- Castle Bromwich Hall
- Dorlestone Hall
- Edgbaston Hall
- Ellowes Hall (demolished)
- Fox Hollies Hall
- Great Barr Hall
- Grimshaw Hall
- Haden Hill House
- Highbury Hall
- Little Aston Hall
- Moseley Hall, Birmingham
- New Berry Hall
- New Hall Manor
- Oak House, West Bromwich
- Perry Hall (demolished)
- Priory Hall, Dudley
- Red House Park
- Sandwell Hall (demolished)
- Selly Manor
- Soho House
- Solihull Manor House
- Stratford House
- West Bromwich Manor House
- Wightwick Manor
- Woodloes Farm
- Yateley Road

=== West Sussex ===
- The Abbey, Storrington
- Abersley Hall
- Aldworth House
- Arundel Castle
- Beach House
- Bignor Park
- Blackdown House
- Borde Hill Garden
- Brantridge Park
- Burton park
- Castle Goring
- Charlwood House
- Chithurst Abbey
- Coates House
- Cowdray House
- Cowdray Park
- Danny House
- Denne Park House
- East Lavington House
- Ecclesden Manor, Angmering
- Ewhurst Manor
- Field Place
- Felpham Manor House
- Findon Place
- Goodwood House
- Halnaker House
- Holmbush, near Faygate
- Hotham Park House
- Knepp Castle
- Lavington Park
- Legh Manor
- Leonardslee
- Muntham Court (demolished)
- Newtimber Place
- Ockenden Manor
- Parham Park
- Petworth House
- Pitshill
- Saint Hill Manor
- Sedgewick Park
- Sennicotts
- Shermanbury Place
- Shillinglee
- South Mundham House
- Standen
- Stansted Park
- Stoneley House
- Uppark
- Upper Roundhurst House
- Wakehurst Place
- Weald and Downland Open Air Museum
- West Dean House
- West Lavington House
- Wiston House
- Woolbeding House

=== West Yorkshire ===
- Austhorpe Hall
- Bankfield Museum
- Becca Hall
- Bolling Hall, Bradford
- Bowcliffe Hall
- Bracken Hall Countryside Centre and Museum
- Bramham Park
- Bretton Hall
- Brontë Parsonage Museum
- Calverley Old Hall
- Carr Manor
- Chevet Hall (demolished)
- Cliffe Castle Museum
- Creskeld Hall
- Dobroyd Castle
- East Riddlesden Hall
- Esholt Hall
- Farnley Hall
- Fryston Hall (demolished)
- Gledstone Hall
- Harewood House
- Holdsworth House
- Kirklees Hall
- Lotherton Hall
- Manor House Museum
- Nostell Priory
- Oakwell Hall
- Oakwood Hall
- Oakworth Hall
- Oulton Hall
- Parlington Hall (demolished)
- Red House Museum
- Scout Hall
- Shelley Hall
- Shibden Hall
- Sowerby Hall
- Spring Hall
- Temple Newsam
- Thornhill Hall (ruined)
- Tong Hall
- Walterclough Hall
- Walton Hall
- Whitley Beaumont
- Wood Hall Country House Hotel
- Woodsome Hall
- Woolley Hall

=== Wiltshire ===
- Amesbury Abbey
- Ashcombe House
- Ashton Gifford House
- Avebury Manor & Garden
- Baynton House
- Berryfield House
- Berwick House
- Biddesden House
- Bishopstrow House
- Bolehyde Manor
- Bowood House
- Brownston House
- Chalcot House
- Charlton Park
- Clouds House
- Coleshill House
- Compton Bassett House
- Corsham Court
- Cottles House
- Devizes Castle
- Draycot House
- Ferne House
- Fonthill Abbey
- Fosbury House
- Great Chalfield Manor
- Hannington Hall
- Hartham Park
- Heale House
- Heywood House
- Hurdcott House
- Iford Manor
- Lacock Abbey
- Lake House
- Little Durnford Manor
- Littlecote House
- Longford Castle
- Longleat
- Lydiard Park
- Maiden Bradley House
- Manor House Hotel
- Melksham House
- Mompesson House
- Monkton Farleigh Manor
- Monkton House
- Neston Park
- Newhouse
- New Wardour Castle
- The Old Bell
- Philipps House
- Pythouse
- Ramsbury Manor
- Ray Mill House
- Reddish House
- Rood Ashton House (largely demolished)
- Roundway House (largely demolished)
- Salthrop House
- Sheldon Manor
- South Wraxall Manor
- Southbroom House
- Stourhead
- Tedworth House
- Tilshead Lodge
- Tottenham House
- Trafalgar House
- Wardour Castle
- Westwood Manor
- Whatley Manor
- Wilton House
- Wulfhall

=== Worcestershire ===
- Abberley Hall
- Abberton Hall
- Astley Hall, Stourport-on-Severn
- Badge Court
- Barnt Green House
- Baston Hall Farm
- Birtsmorton Court
- Bockleton Court
- Bredon Hall
- Chateau Impney
- Cleeve Prior Manor
- Cofton Hall
- Cotheridge Court
- Croome Court
- Deasland Farm
- Dowles Manor
- Evesham Abbey
- Fairfield House, Belbroughton
- Feckenham Lane House Farm
- Glasshampton (demolished)
- Grafton Manor
- Hagley Hall
- Hampton Lovett Manor House
- Hanbury Hall
- Hanley Castle
- Hartlebury Castle
- Harvington Hall
- Hewell Grange
- Hillhampton House
- Hindlip Hall
- Holmwood, Redditch
- Holt Castle, Worcestershire
- Huddington Court
- The Hyde, Stoke Bliss
- Kemerton Court
- Kyre Park
- Lickey Grange
- Madresfield Court
- Malvern Tudor House
- Maypole Cottage
- Meer Hall
- Mill Hall
- Moat House, Longdon
- New Guesten Hall
- Norgrove Court
- Ombersley Court
- Orchard Farm
- Overbury Court
- Prior's Court
- Shakenhurst Hall
- Sodington Hall
- Spetchley Park
- Strensham Court (demolished)
- Tartebigge Farm
- Thickenappletree Manor
- Tickenhill Palace
- Warndon Court
- Westwood Park
- Wickhamford Manor
- Witley Court
- Woolas Hall
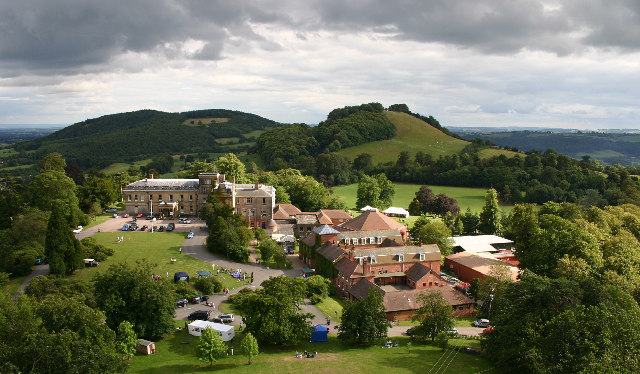
Abberley Hall

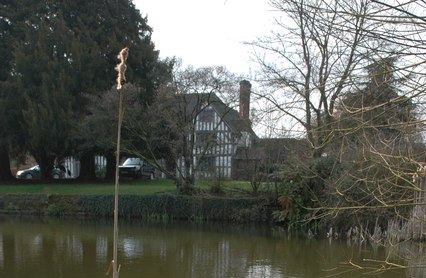
Badge Court

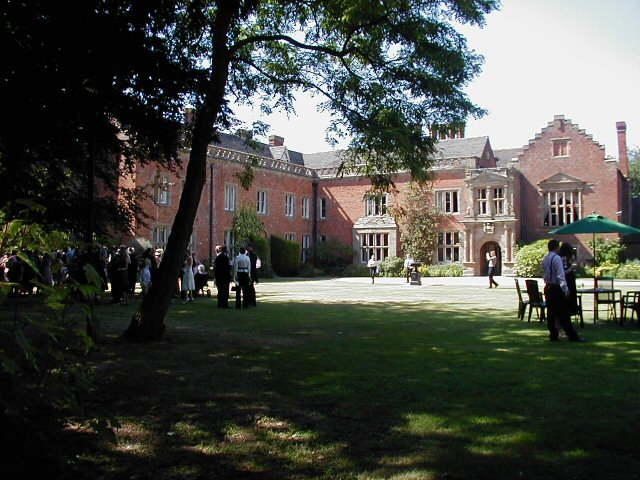
Grafton Manor

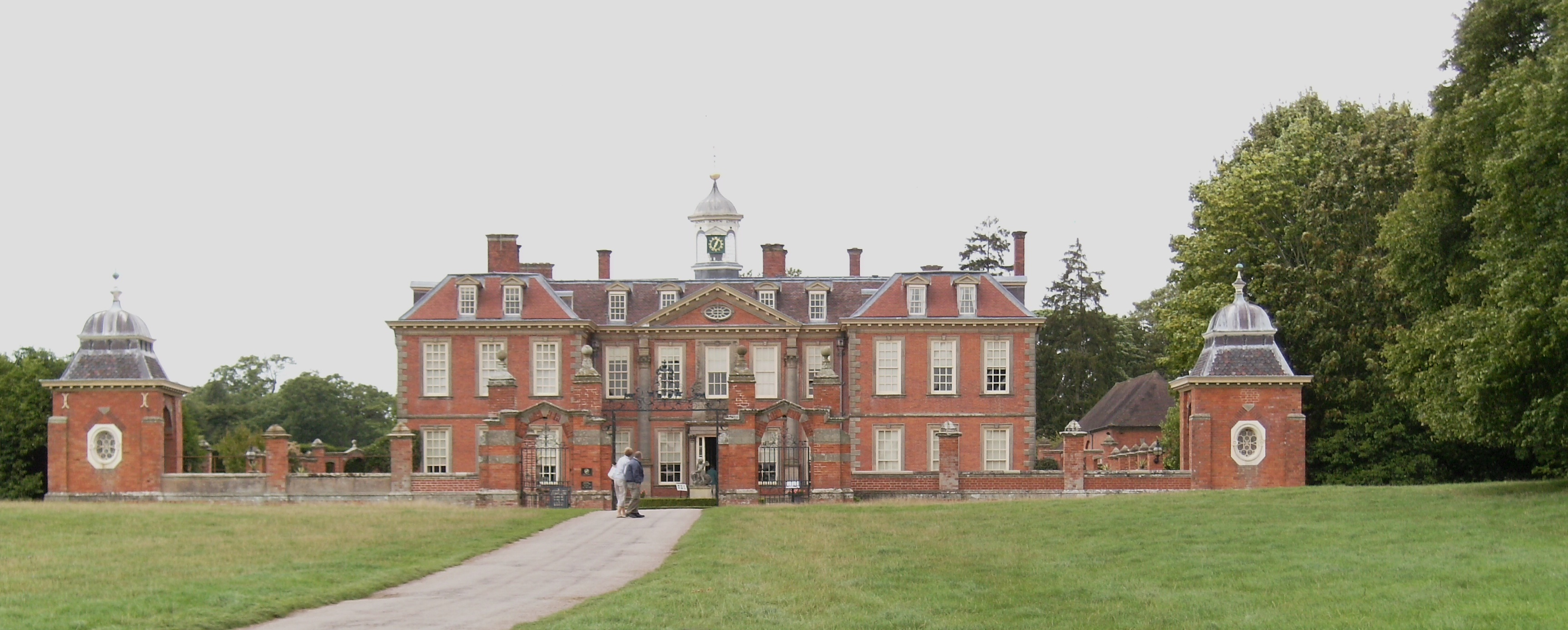
Hanbury Hall

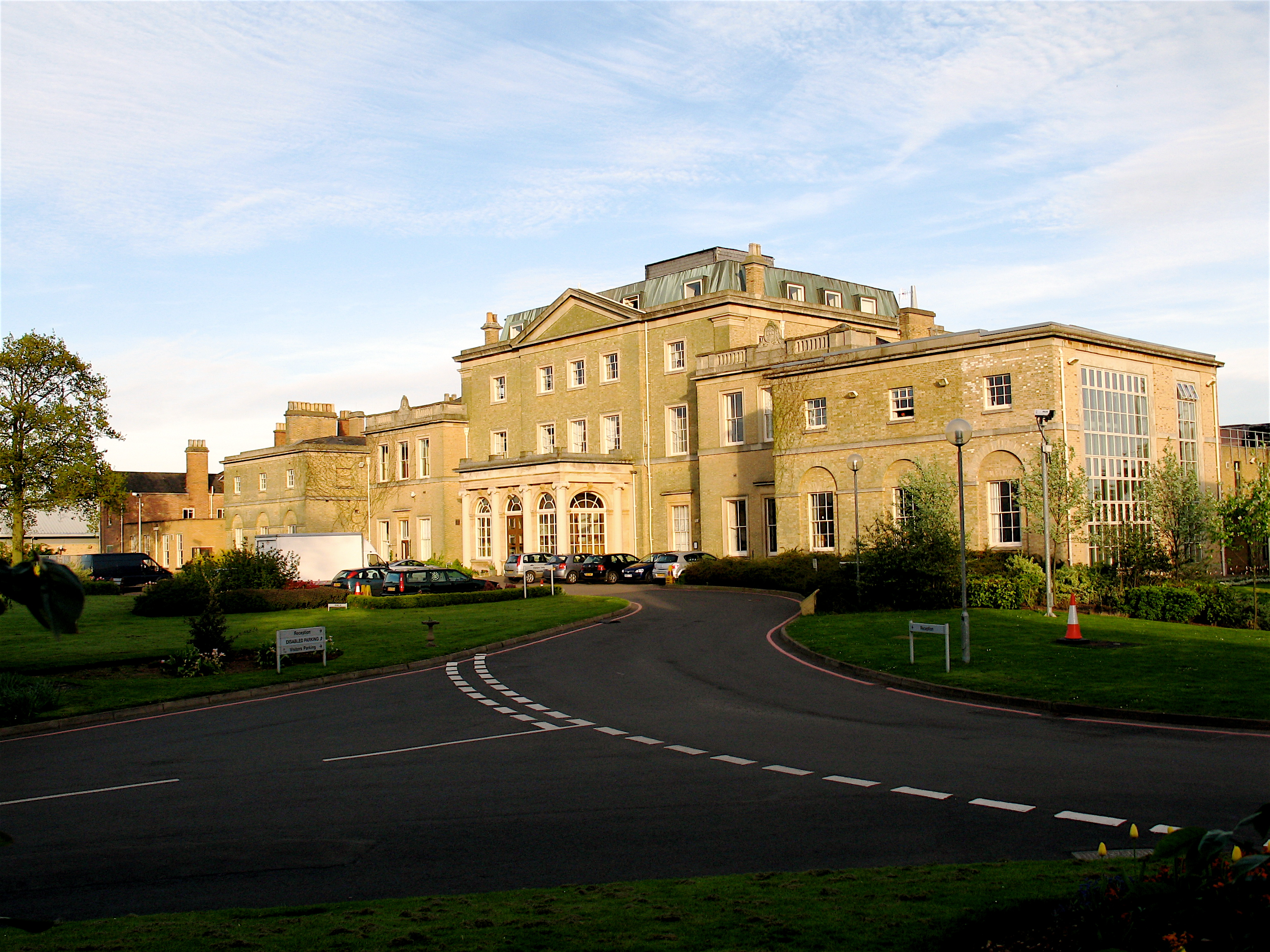
Hindlip Hall

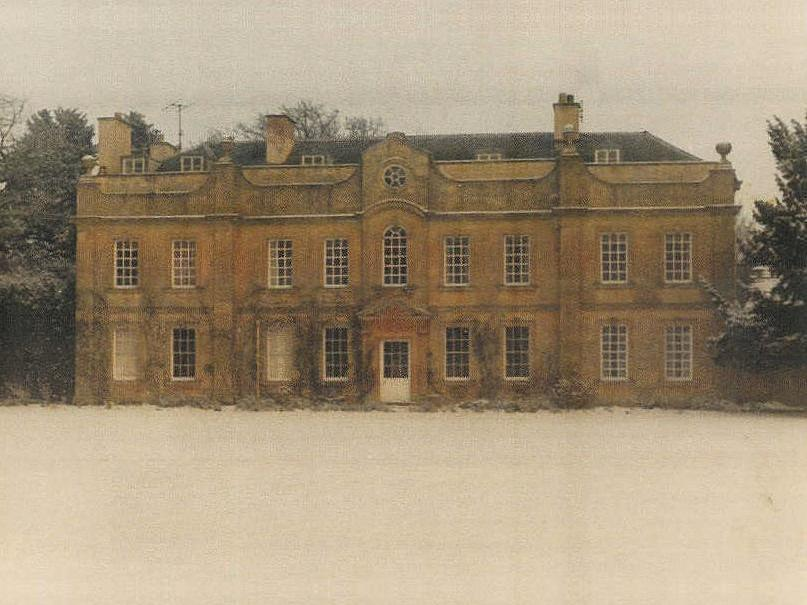
Kemerton Court

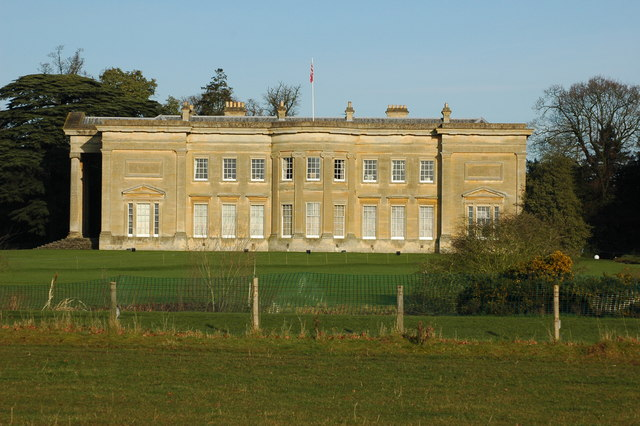
Spetchley Park

== Channel Islands ==
=== Guernsey ===
- La Fregate
- Sausmarez Manor
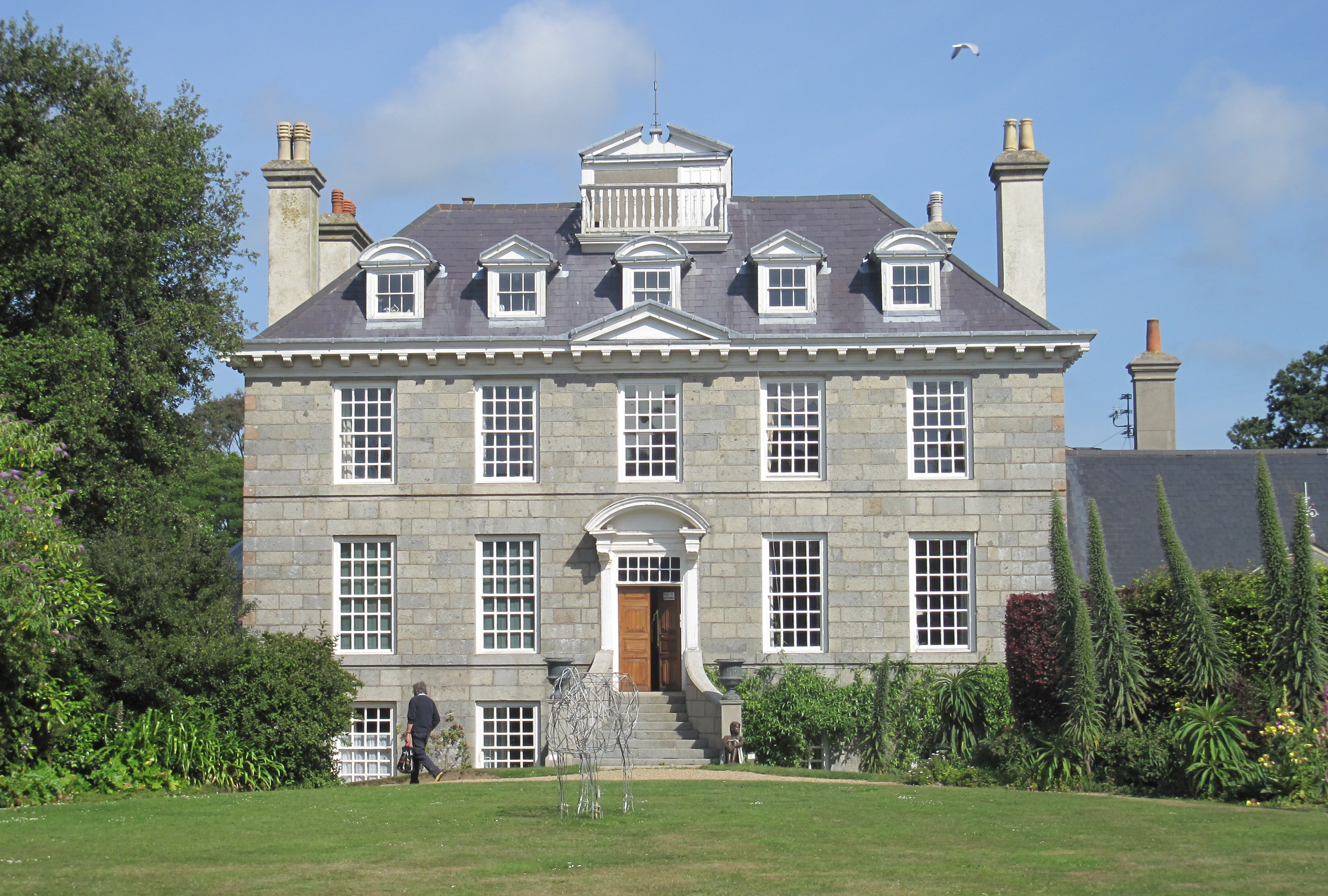
Sausmarez Manor

=== Herm ===
- White House
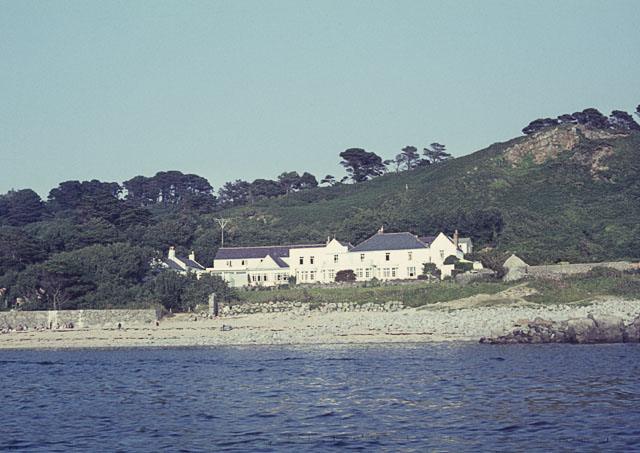
White House

=== Jersey ===
- Les Augrès Manor
- Rozel Manor
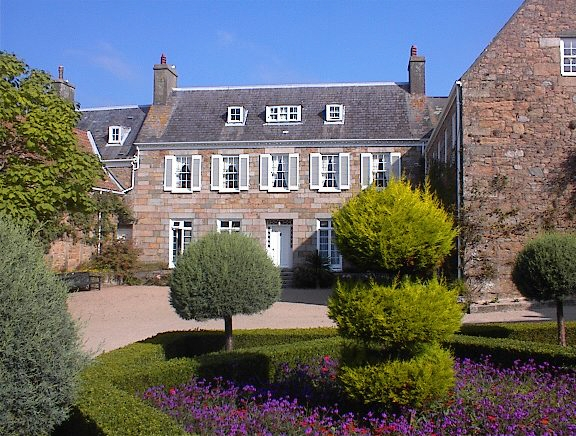
Les Augrès Manor

== Northern Ireland ==
=== Belfast ===
- Belfast Castle

=== County Antrim ===
- Antrim Castle and Clotworthy House
- Arthur Cottage
- Ballygally Castle
- Carrickfergus Castle
- Dundarave House
- Dunluce Castle
- Glenarm Castle
- Moneyglass House
- Sentry Hill
- Shane's Castle
- Castle Upton
- Craigdun castle

=== County Armagh ===
- Ardress House
- The Argory
- Ballymoyer House (demolished)
- Castlecaulfield (ruins)
- Drumbanagher House (demolished)
- Gosford Castle
- Richhill Castle
- Tandragee Castle
- Tynan Abbey

=== County Down ===
- Bangor Castle
- Burrenwood
- Castle Ward
- Castlewellan Castle
- Clandeboye Estate
- Grey Abbey House
- Hillsborough Castle
- Killyleagh Castle
- Mount Stewart
- Quintin Castle
- Rowallane House
- Seaforde House
- Waringstown House

=== County Fermanagh ===
- Castle Archdale
- Belle Isle Castle
- Castle Coole
- Colebrooke Park
- Crom Castle
- Enniskillen Castle
- Florence Court
- Necarne

=== County Londonderry ===
- Bellaghy Bawn
- Downhill House/Mussenden Temple
- Dungiven Castle
- Prehen House
- Springhill House

=== County Tyrone ===
- Baronscourt
- Benburb Castle
- Blessingbourne House
- Caledon House
- Castle Caulfield
- Favour Royal
- Lissan House
- Parkanaur House

== Scotland ==
=== Aberdeen ===
- Friendville

=== Aberdeenshire ===
- Aberdour House
- Balbithan House
- Balmoral Castle
- Birkhall
- Bourtie House
- Braemar Castle
- Cairness House
- Candacraig House
- Castle of Park
- Cluny Castle
- Crimonmogate
- Duff House
- Dunecht House
- Elsick House
- Fasque House
- Fetteresso Castle
- Forglen House
- Fyvie Castle
- Glas-allt-Shiel
- Haddo House
- Hatton Castle
- House of Memsie
- Leith Hall
- Meldrum House
- Monboddo House
- Muchalls Castle
- New Slains Castle
- Pitfour (demolished)
- Rickarton House
- Tilquhillie Castle
- Ury House
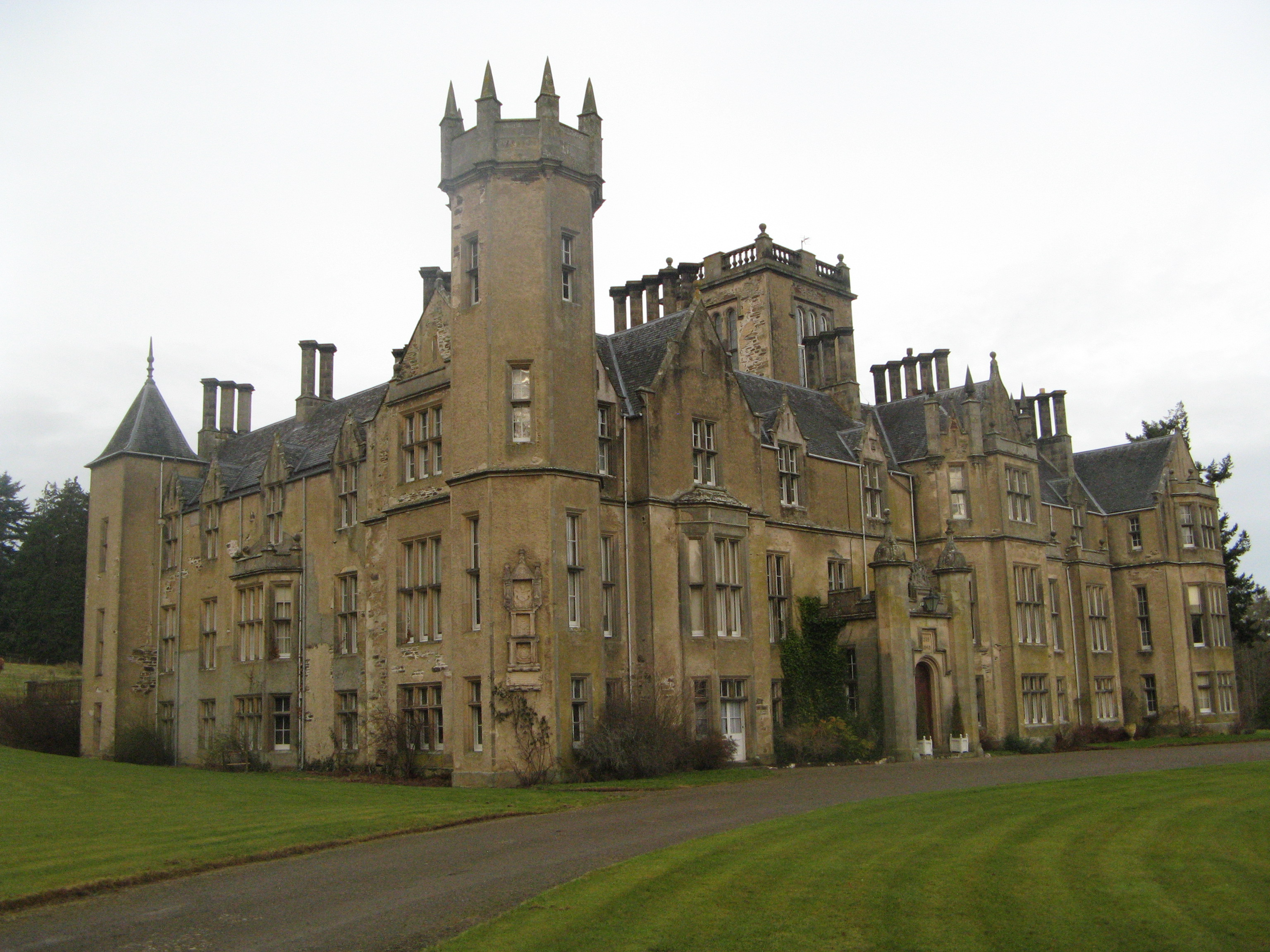
Forglen House

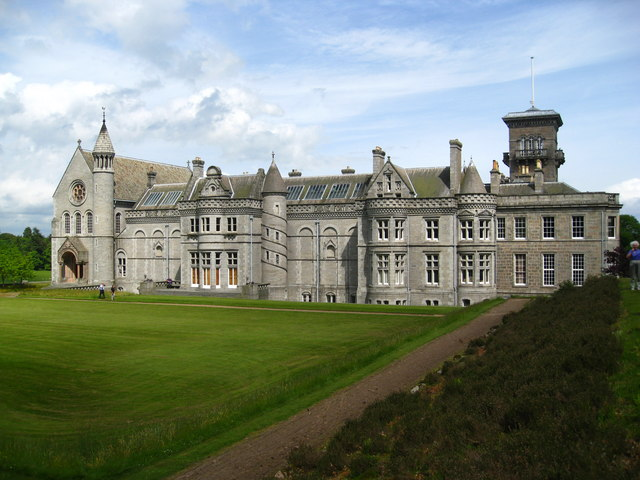
Dunecht House

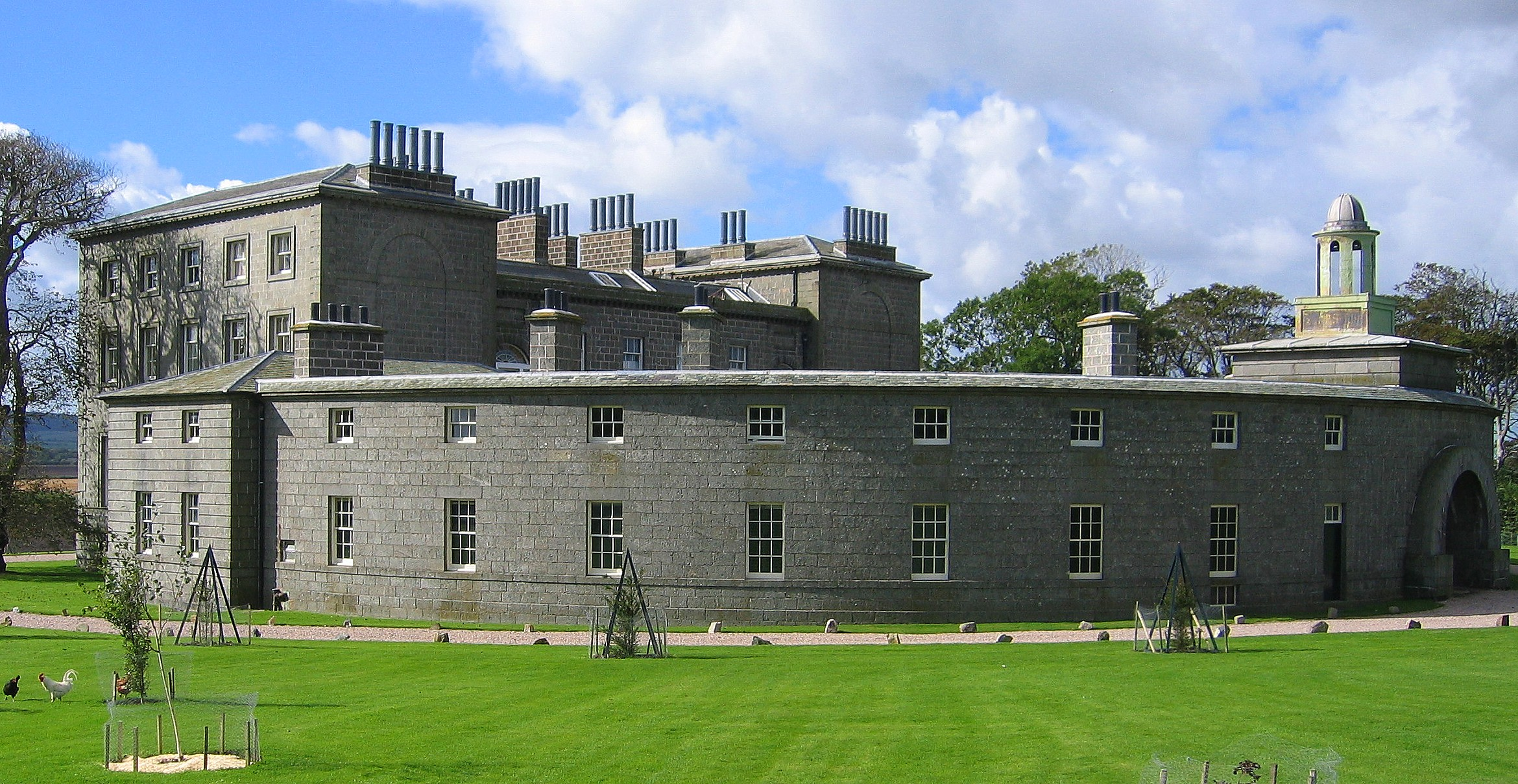
Cairness House showing the hemicycle at the rear

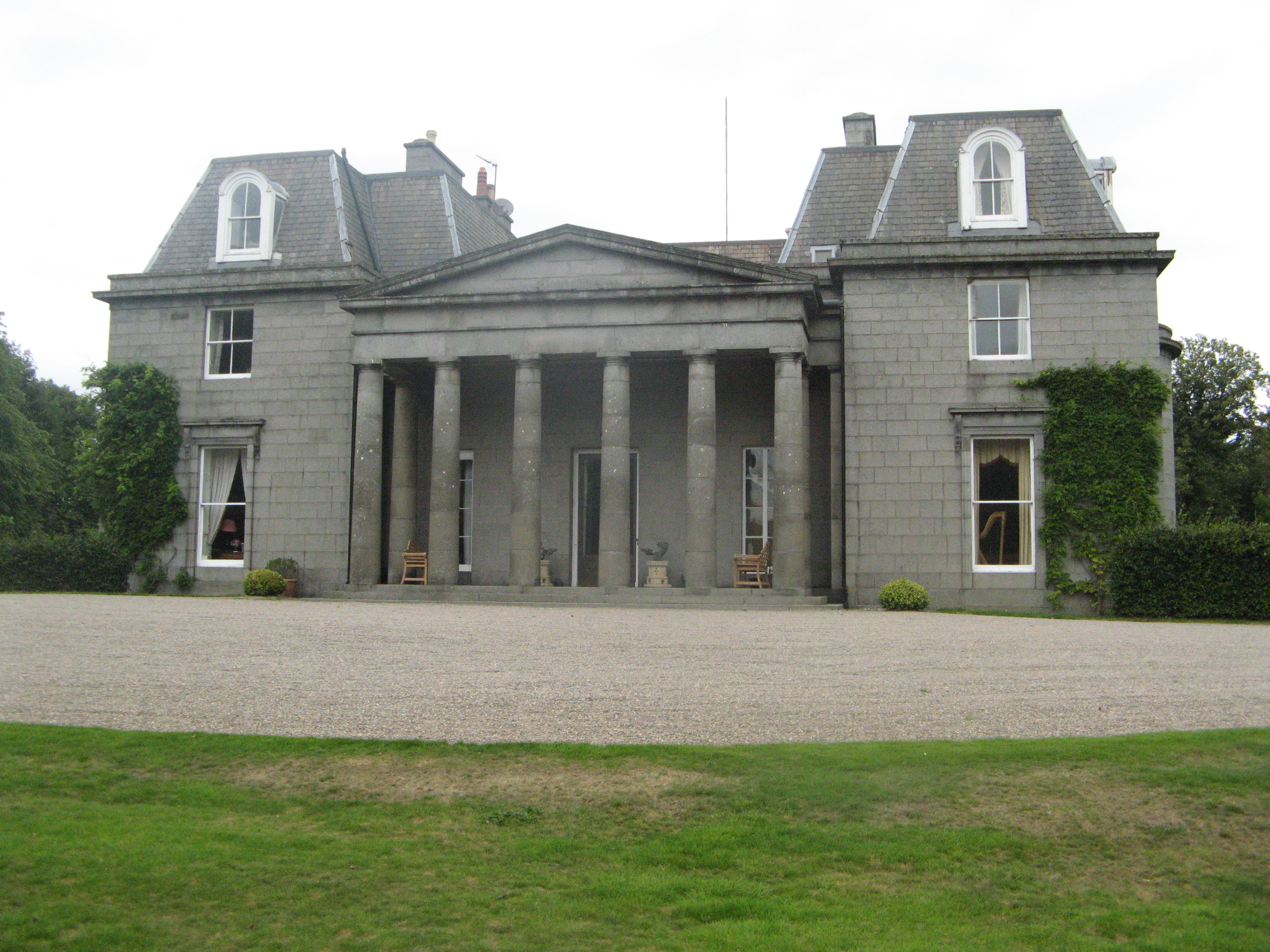
Crimonmogate

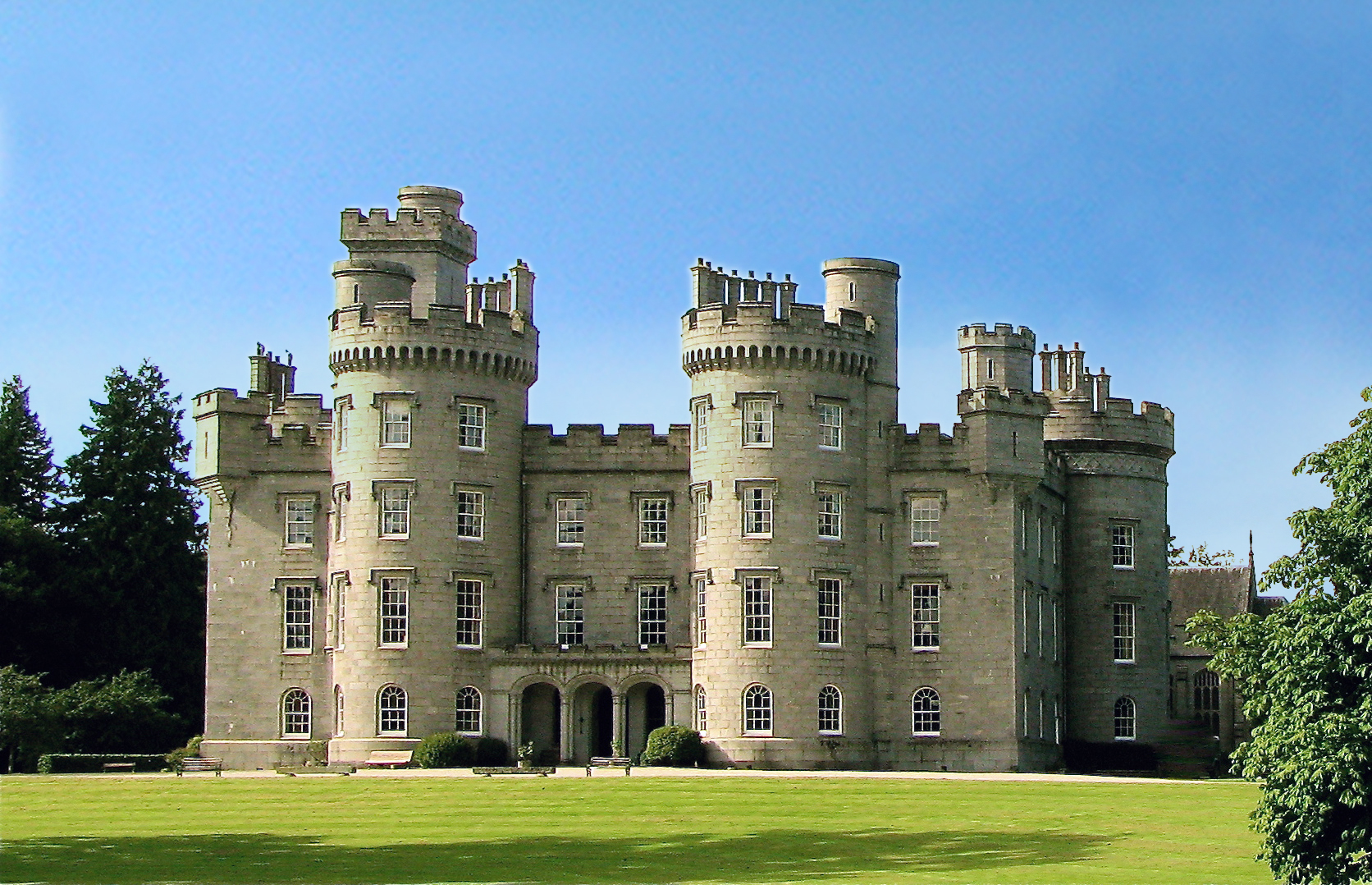
Cluny Castle

=== Angus ===
- Affleck Castle
- Airlie Castle
- Ascreavie
- Auchterhouse Castle
- Balfour Castle, Angus
- Balintore Castle
- Brechin Castle
- Careston Castle
- Colliston Castle
- Cortachy Castle
- Dunninald Castle
- Edzell Castle Historic Monument
- Ethie Castle
- Farnell Castle (Former residence of the Bishops of Brechin)
- Finavon Castle Historic Monument
- Finavon Castle (19th-century mansion)
- Gardyne Castle
- Glamis Castle
- Guthrie Castle
- Hospitalfield House
- House of Dun
- Invermark Castle Historic Monument
- Inverquharity Castle
- Kinnaird Castle, Brechin
- Kinnettles Castle
- Kinnordy House
- Kinpurnie Castle
- Letham Grange estate
- Melgund Castle
- Milton of Finavon House
- Panmure House
- Red Castle, Angus (Ruined fortified house)

=== Argyll and Bute ===
- Ardfin
- Ardkinglas House
- Ascog House
- Balmory Hall
- Colonsay House
- Duart Castle
- Dunlossit House
- Hafton House
- Inveraray Castle
- Islay House
- Kilberry Castle
- Kildalton Castle
- Kilmory Castle
- Mount Stuart House
- New Castle Lachlan
- St Conan's Tower
- Tiroran House
- Torosay Castle

=== Clackmannanshire ===
- Brucefield House
- Cowden Park House
- Gean House

=== Dumfries and Galloway ===
- Arbigland
- Ardwall House
- Cally Palace
- Craigdarroch
- Craigenputtock House
- Crawfordton House
- Drumlanrig Castle
- Earlstoun Castle
- Friar's Carse
- Galloway House
- Gelston Castle
- Glenlair House
- Kinmount House
- Monreith House
- Rammerscales House
- Springkell house
- Terregles House

=== Dundee ===
- Camperdown House
- Dudhope Castle

=== East Ayrshire ===
- Auchinleck House
- Carnell Estate
- Dalmore House and Estate
- Dumfries House
- Lands of Dallars
- Sorn Castle

=== East Dunbartonshire ===
- Craigend Castle

=== East Lothian ===
- Archerfield House
- Bankton House
- Biel House
- Carberry Tower
- Elphinstone Tower
- Gosford House
- Greywalls
- Hamilton House
- Inveresk Lodge, NTS
- Keith Marischal
- Lennoxlove House
- Newhailes
- Northfield House
- Pinkie House
- Prestongrange House - Royal Musselburgh Golf Club
- Saltoun Hall
- Seton Castle
- Stevenson House
- Winton House

=== East Renfrewshire ===
- Capelrig House
- Glanderson House

=== Edinburgh ===
- Craigiehall
- Dalmeny House
- Dundas Castle
- Haltoun House
- Lauriston Castle
- Prestonfield House

=== Falkirk ===
- Callendar House
- Kinneil House

=== Fife ===
- Balcaskie
- Broomhall House
- Crawford Priory (ruin)
- Earlshall Castle
- Elie House
- Falkland Palace
- Hallyards Castle
- Kellie Castle
- Leslie House
- Melville House
- Myres Castle
- Pitcairn House
- Priestfield House (demolished)
- Rossend Castle
- Tulliallan Castle

=== Glasgow ===
- Haggs Castle
- Pollok House
- Provan Hall

=== Highland ===
- Achvarasdal House
- Arisaig House, Arisaig
- Carbisdale Castle
- Cawdor Castle, Nairn
- Colonsay House
- Dunrobin Castle, Sutherland
- Dunvegan Castle, Isle of Skye
- Forss House Hotel
- Lemlair House
- Novar House

=== Inverclyde ===
- Ardgowan House
- Castle Wemyss (demolished)
- Duchal House
- Finlaystone House

=== Midlothian ===
- Arniston House
- Dalkeith Palace
- Newbattle Abbey
- Mavisbank House
- Melville Castle
- Penicuik House
- Vogrie House

=== Moray ===
- Cullen House, Cullen
- Ballindalloch Castle, Banffshire
- Darnaway Castle, nr Forres
- Gordon Castle, Fochabers
- Innes House, nr Elgin
- Thunderton House, Elgin

=== North Ayrshire ===
- Bourtreehill House
- Burnhouse Manor
- Kelburn Castle
- Kerelaw House
- Mount Stuart House

=== North Lanarkshire ===
- Cambusnethan House
- Colzium House
- Cumbernauld House
- Dalziel House

=== Orkney Islands ===
- Balfour Castle

=== Perth and Kinross ===
- Ballathie House
- Battleby
- Blair Castle
- Dalchonzie
- Drumkilbo
- Dunalastair Hotel
- Dupplin Castle
- Faskally House
- Fingask Castle
- Gleneagles Hotel
- Killiechassie House
- Kinross House
- Lude House
- Moncreiffe House
- Ochtertyre
- Rossie Priory
- Scone Palace
- Stobhall
- Taymouth Castle

=== Renfrewshire ===
- Blackhall Manor
- Burnhouse Manor
- Castle Semple
- Formakin House
- Parkhouse Manor

=== Scottish Borders ===
- Abbotsford House
- Ayton Castle
- Black Barony
- Bowhill House
- Chesters
- Cringletie
- Dryburgh Abbey Hotel
- Duns Castle
- Ednam House Hotel
- Floors Castle
- Kirna House (The Kirna, also Grangehill)
- Manderston
- Mellerstain House, Berwickshire
- Monteviot House, Jedburgh
- Neidpath Castle, Peeblesshire
- Paxton House
- Thirlestane Castle, Berwickshire
- Traquair House, Peeblesshire
- Wedderburn Castle
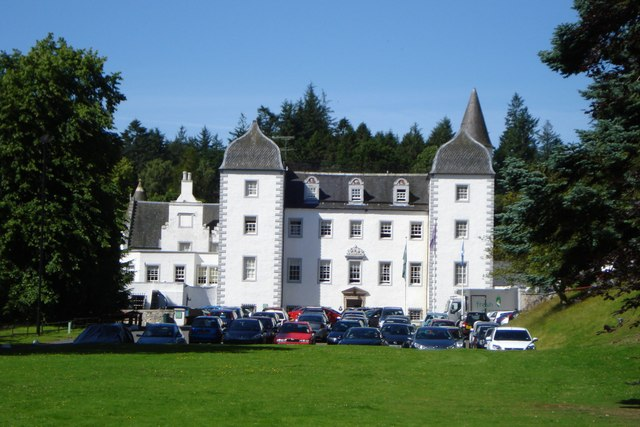
Black Barony

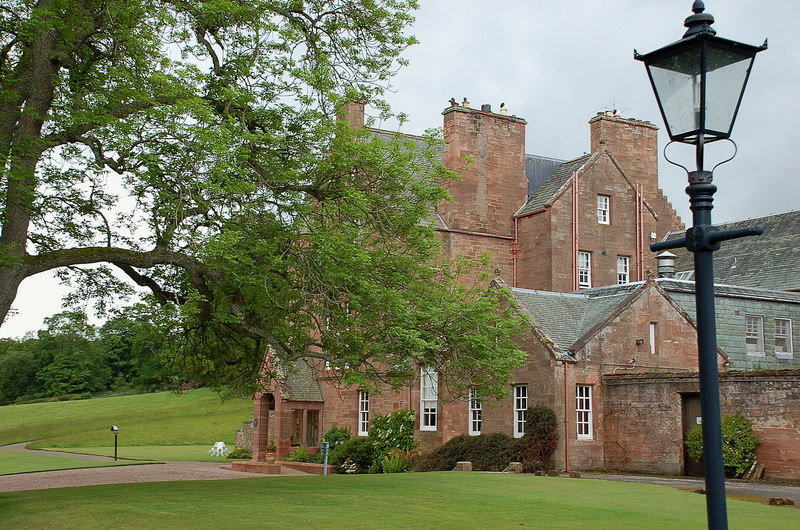
Cringletie House

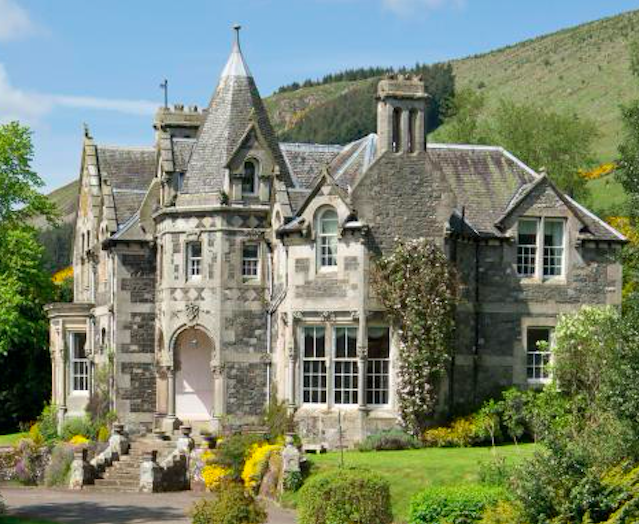
The Kirna, Walkerburn

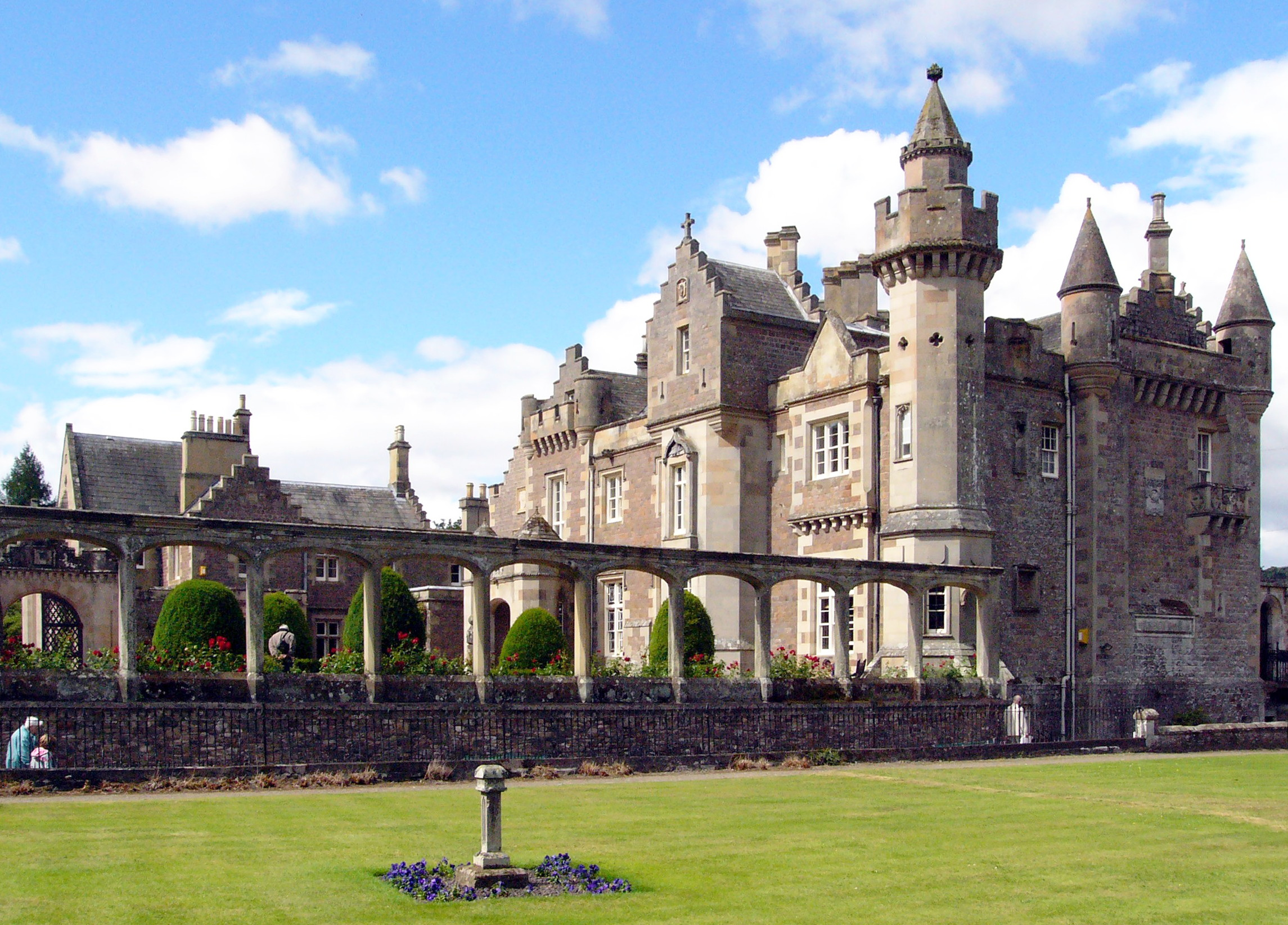
Abbotsford House

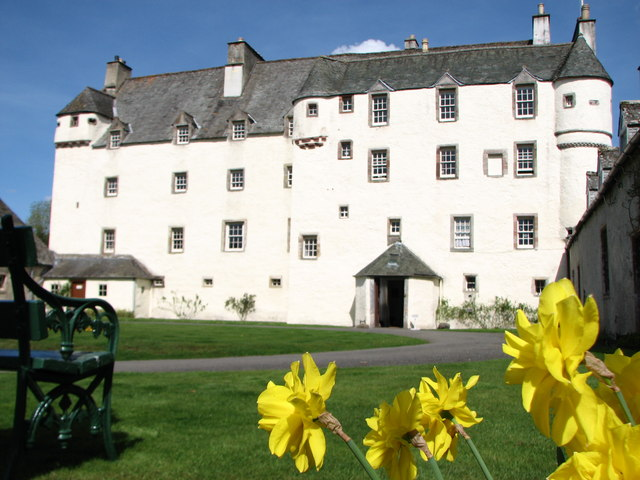
Traquair House

=== Shetland Islands ===
- Belmont House
- Brough Lodge
- Busta House
- Gardie House
- Lunna House
- Symbister House

=== South Ayrshire ===
- Auchans Castle
- Auchincruive
- Black Clauchrie House
- Blairquhan Castle
- Culzean Castle

=== South Lanarkshire ===
- Carstairs House
- Corehouse
- Hamilton Palace

=== Stirling ===
- Argyll's Lodging
- Gartmore House
- Strathblane Country House
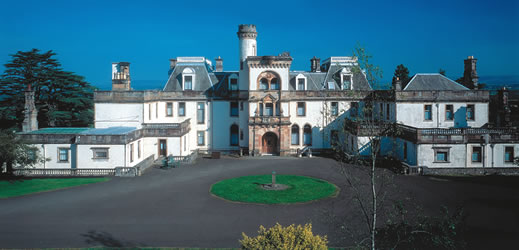
Gartmore House

=== West Dunbartonshire ===
- Balloch Castle
- Overtoun House

=== West Lothian ===
- Balbardie House (demolished)
- The Binns
- Blackburn House
- Hopetoun House
- Howden House
- Linlithgow Palace
- Polkemmet House (demolished)

=== Western Isles ===
- Amhuinnsuidhe Castle
- Ardfin Estate
- Lews Castle

== Wales ==
=== Bridgend ===
- Bryngarw House
- Court Colman Manor
- Merthyr Mawr House

=== Caerphilly ===
- Llancaiach Fawr Manor
- Maes Manor
- Ruperra Castle

=== Cardiff ===
- Bishop's Palace
- Castell Coch
- Castell-y-mynach
- Cardiff Castle
- Insole Court
- St Fagans Castle
- Llanrumney Hall
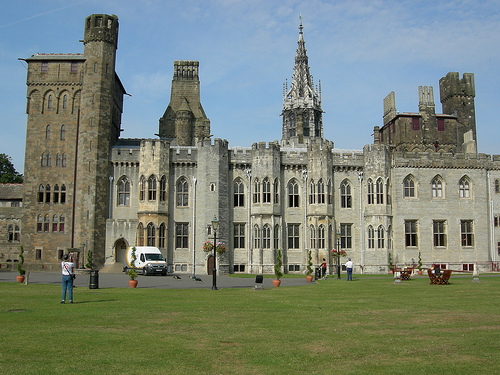
Cardiff Castle

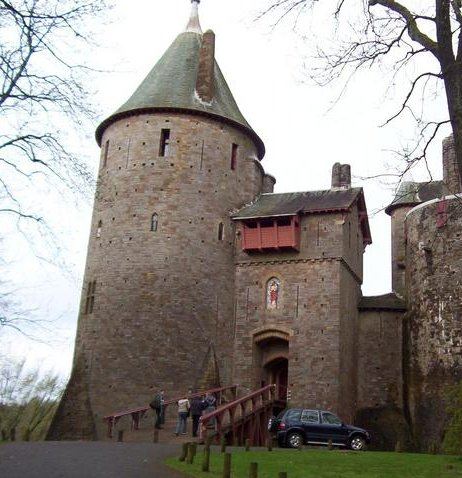
Castell Coch

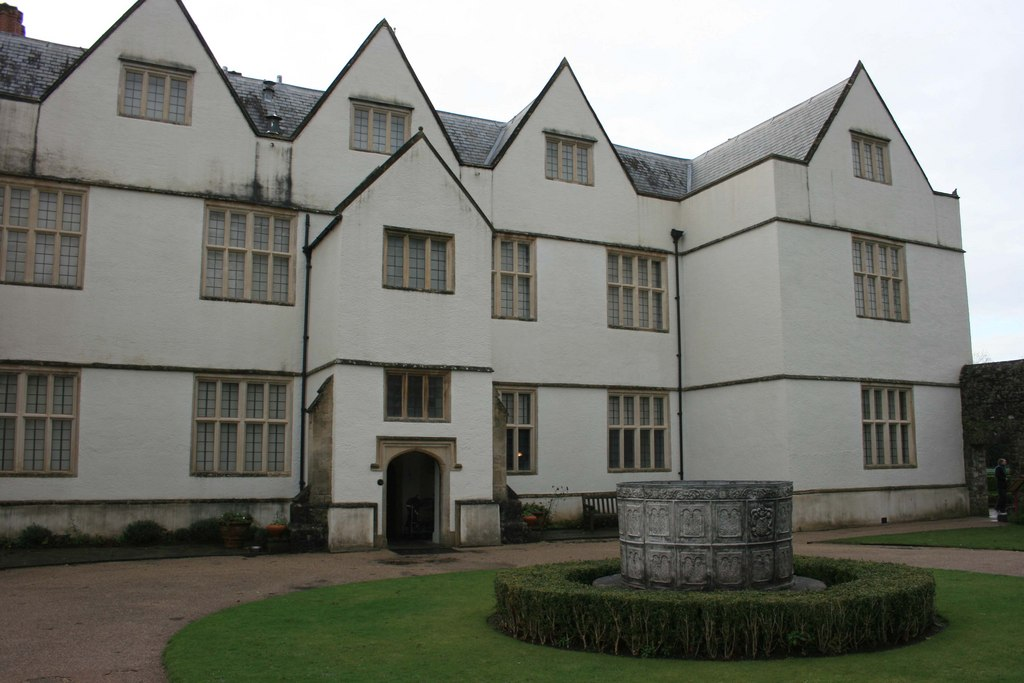
St Fagans Castle

=== Carmarthenshire ===
- Aberglasney
- Cwmgwili
- Golden Grove
- Newton House
- Parc Howard
- Plas Llanstephan
- Plas Taliaris
- Stradey Castle
- Ty Gwyn ar Daf

=== Ceredigion ===
- Castle Green House
- Falcondale House
- Glanarberth - Demolished in 1986
- Glandyfi Castle
- Hafod House - demolished 1958
- Mabws Hall
- Nanteos Mansion
- Llanerchaeron

=== Conwy ===
- Bodysgallen Hall
- Bodnant House
- Gloddaeth Hall
- Gwydir Castle
- Gwrych Castle
- Kinmel Hall
- Plas Iolyn
- Plas Mawr
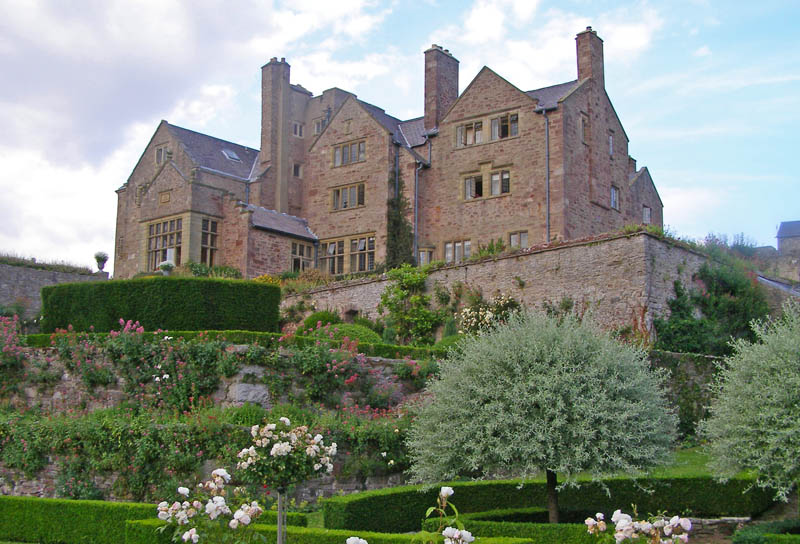
Bodysgallen Hall

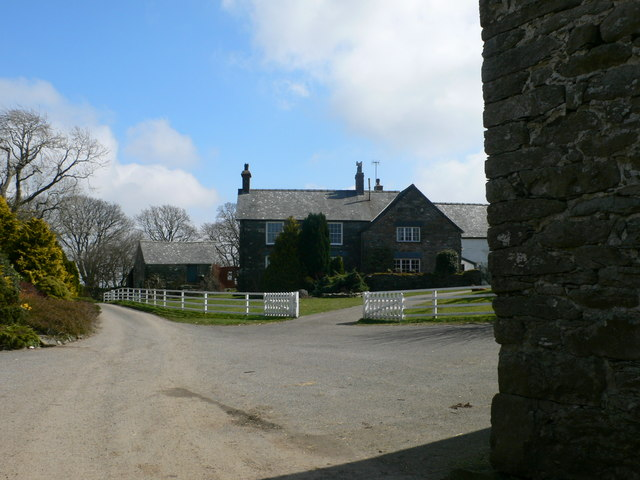
Plas Iolyn

=== Denbighshire ===
- Bodelwyddan Castle
- Bodrhyddan Hall
- Brynbella
- Eriviat Hall
- Faenol Fawr
- Foxhall Newydd
- Llannerch Hall
- Llangedwyn Hall
- Ruthin Castle
- Trevor Hall
- Wigfair Hall
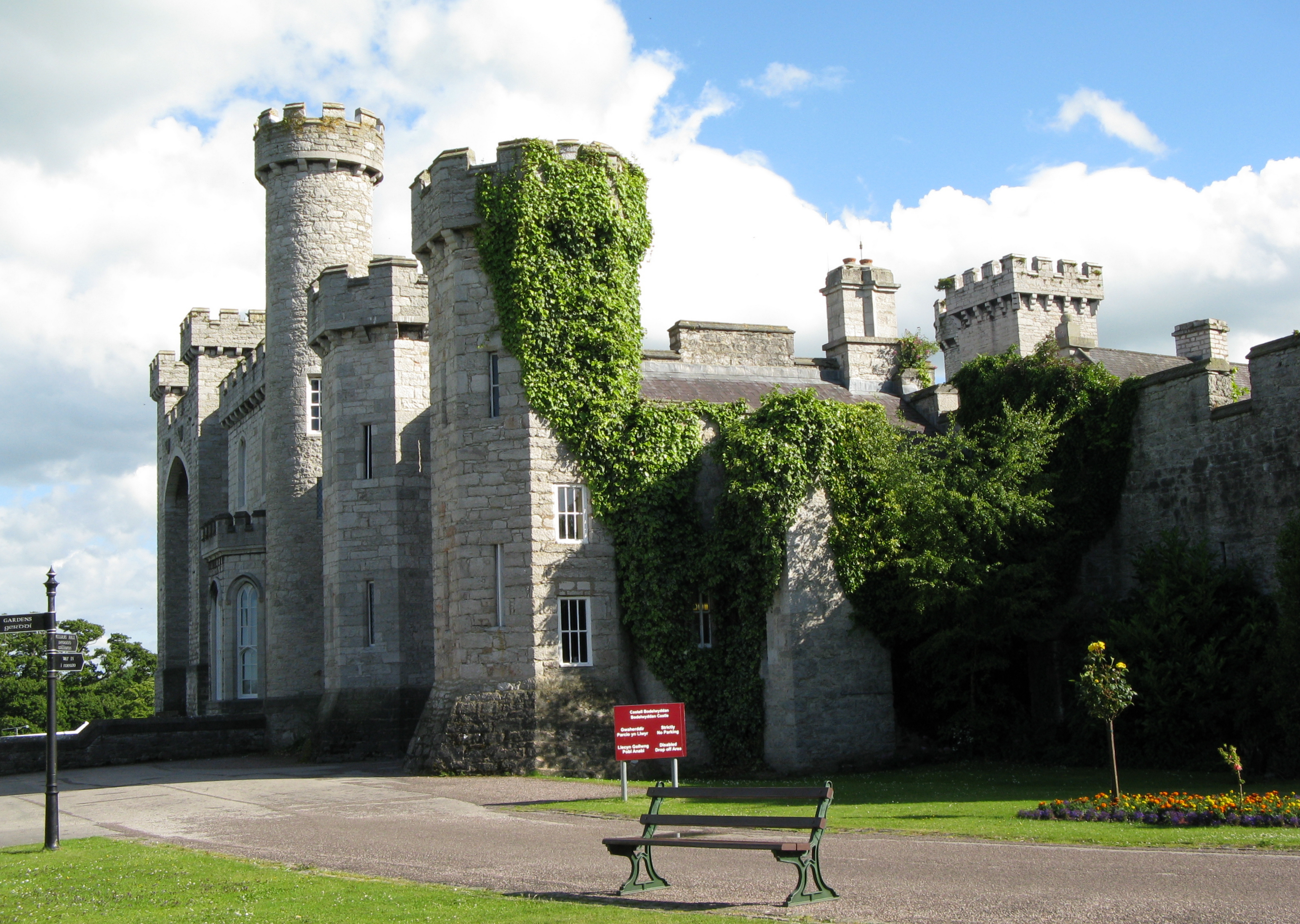
Bodelwyddan Castle

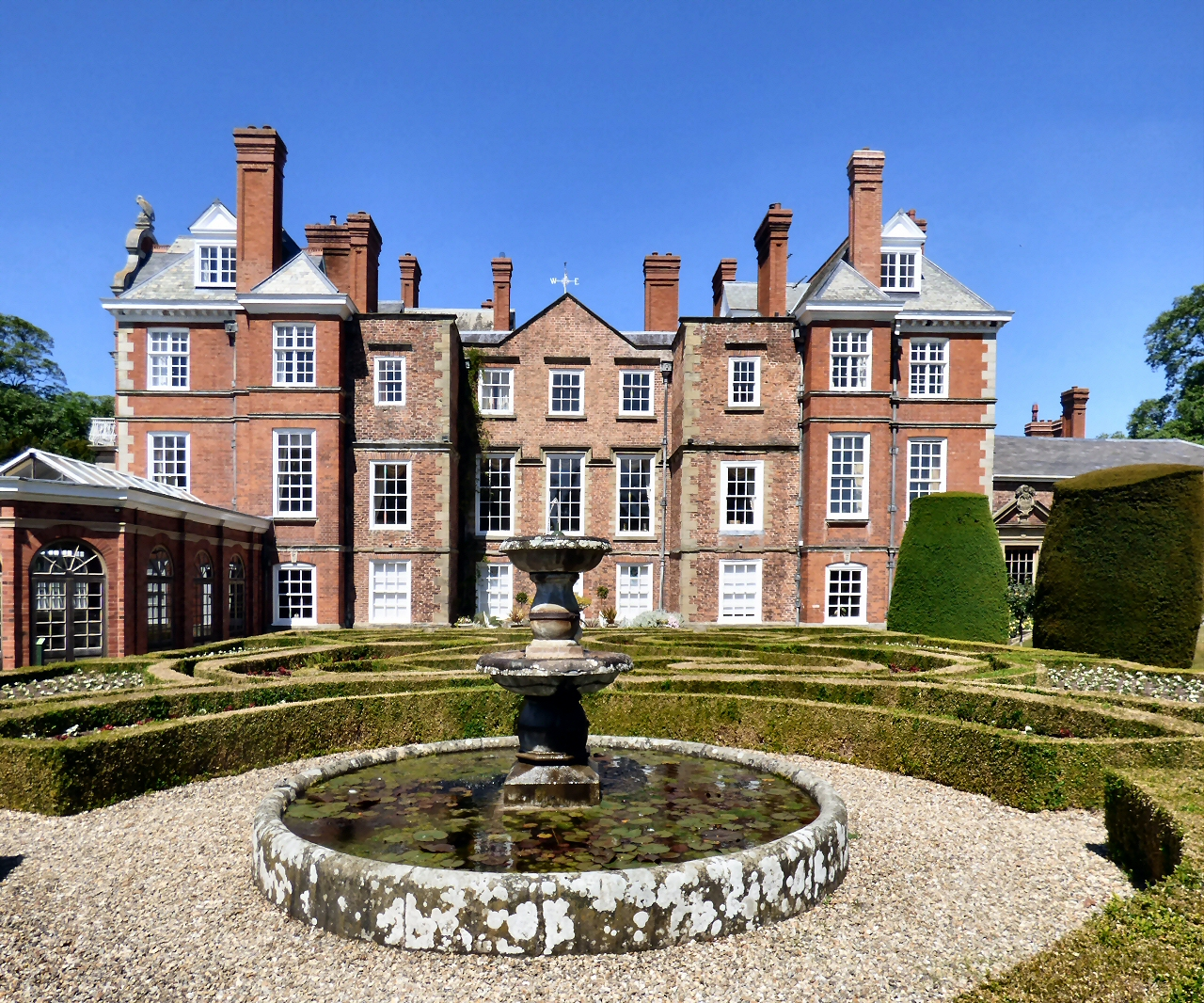
Bodrhyddan Hall

=== Flintshire ===
- Downing Hall
- Gyrn Castle
- Hawarden Castle
- Hartsheath
- Mostyn Hall
- Northop Hall Country House Hotel
- Soughton Hall
- Talacre Abbey

=== Gwynedd ===
- Cochwillan Old Hall
- Bryn Bras Castle
- Bodysgallen
- Glan Gwna
- Gloddaeth
- Maenan Hall
- Nannau
- Penrhyn Castle
- Plas Bodegroes
- Plas Brondanw
- Plas Glynllifon
- Plas Yn Rhiw
- Vaynol
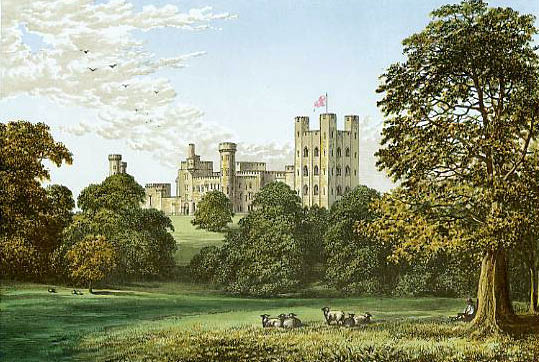
Penrhyn Castle

=== Isle of Anglesey ===
- Baron Hill House
- Bodorgan Hall
- Bodwyr
- Bryn Mel Manor
- Carreglwyd
- Chateau Rhianfa
- Nant yr Odyn Country Hotel
- Plas Bodewryd
- Plas Coch (Anglesey)
- Plas Newydd
- Presaddfed Hall
- Seiont Manor Hotel
- Tre-Ysgawen Hall
- Tre-castell hall (plas Tre-castell)
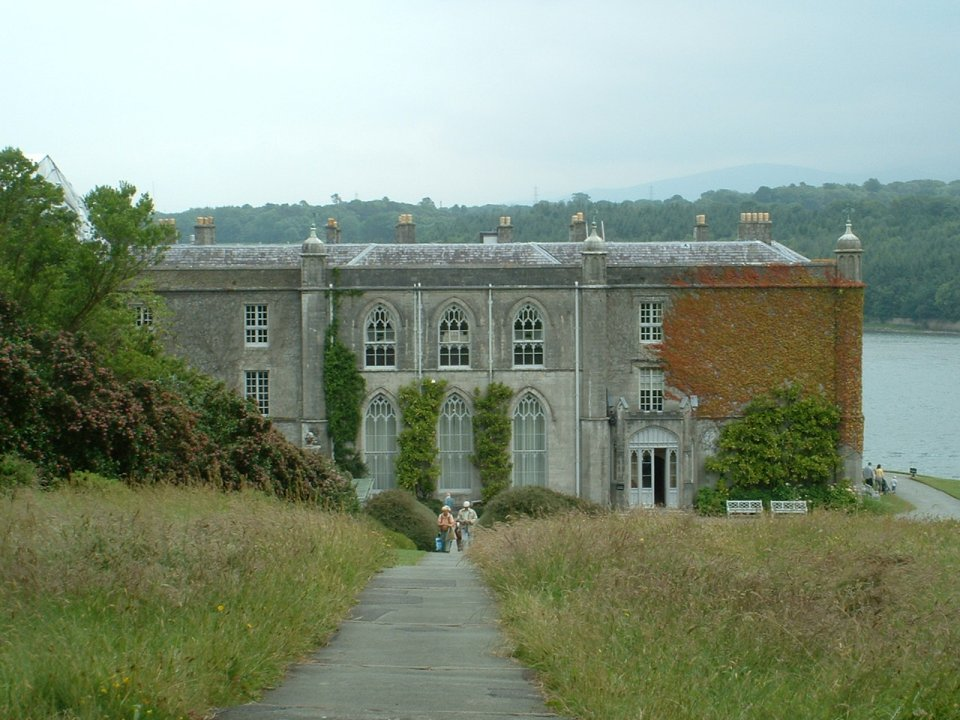
Plas Newydd

=== Merthyr Tydfil ===
- Cyfarthfa Castle

=== Monmouthshire ===
- Caer Llan
- Cefntilla Court
- Clytha Castle
- Clytha Park
- Coldbrook Park (demolished)
- Croft-Y-Bwla
- Dewstow House
- Dingestow Court
- Hadnock Court
- The Hendre
- High Glanau
- Hilston Park
- Itton Court
- Llanarth Court
- Llanfair Grange
- Llantarnam Abbey
- Llanvihangel Court
- Llanwenarth House
- Mounton House
- Mathern Palace
- Newton Court
- Penhein
- Pen-y-Clawdd Court
- Piercefield House
- Shirenewton Hall
- St. Pierre Park
- Treowen
- Troy House
- Wonastow Court
- Wyelands
- Wyndcliffe Court
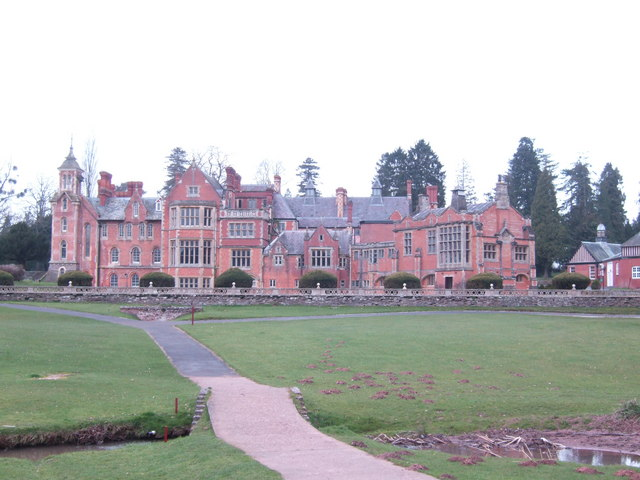
The Hendre

=== Neath Port Talbot ===
- Margam Castle

=== Newport ===
- Beechwood Park
- Kemeys Manor
- Machen House
- Penhow Castle
- Plas Machen
- Tredegar House

=== Pembrokeshire ===
- Amroth Castle (ruinous)
- Carew Castle
- Castell Malgwyn
- Cresselly House
- Ffynone House
- Hênllan (demolished)
- Lamphey Court
- Orielton
- Panteg House
- Penally Abbey
- Picton Castle
- Plas Crwd (ruined)
- Rhosygilwen
- Sealyham House
- St. Brides Castle
- St Davids Bishops Palace
- Scolton Manor
- Slebech Park
- Sodston Manor
- Treffgarne Hall
- Trewern Mansion
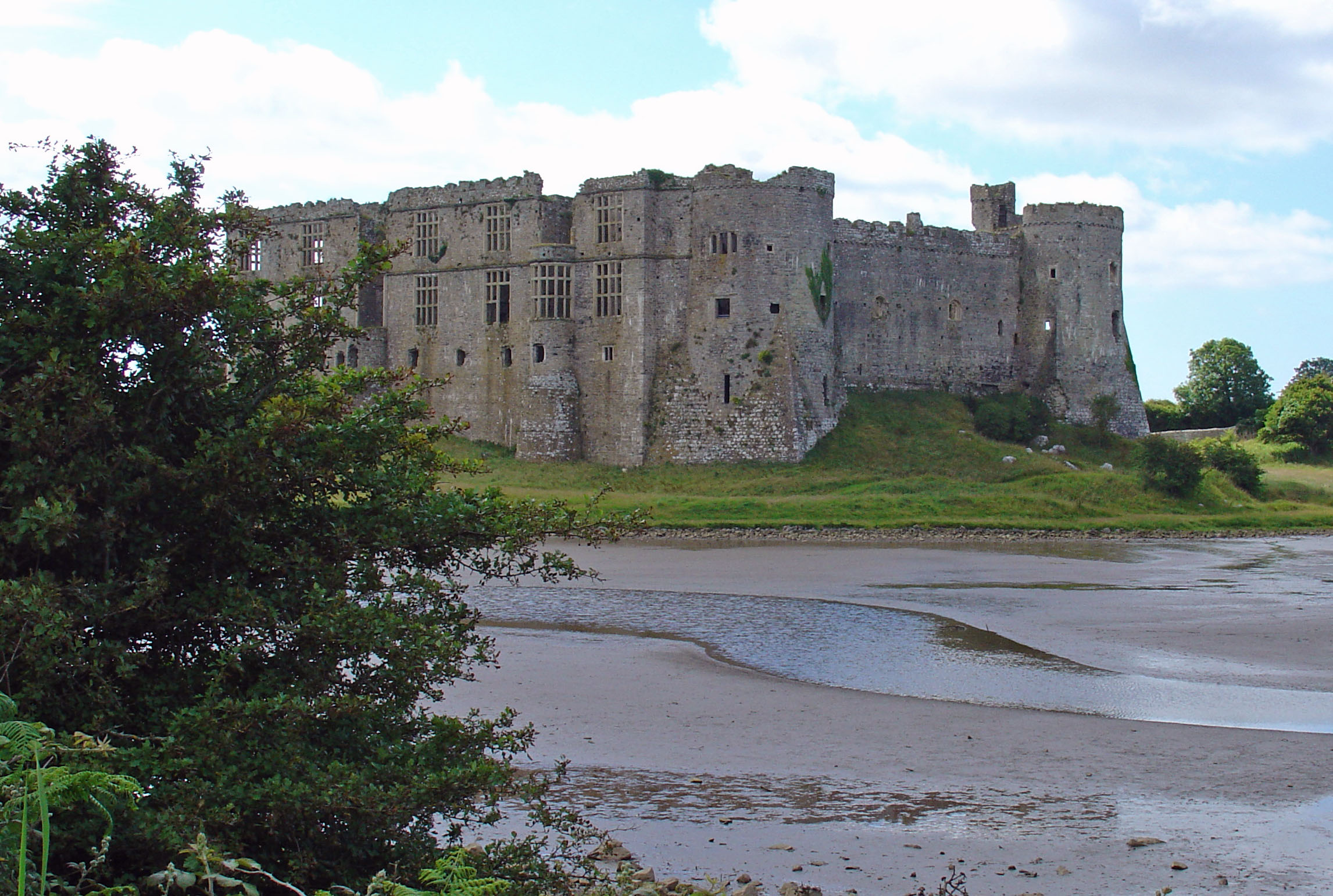
Carew Castle

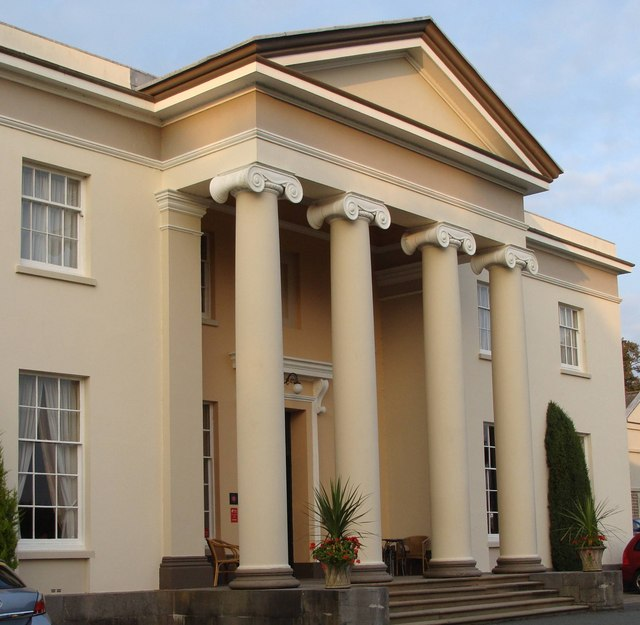
Lamphey Court

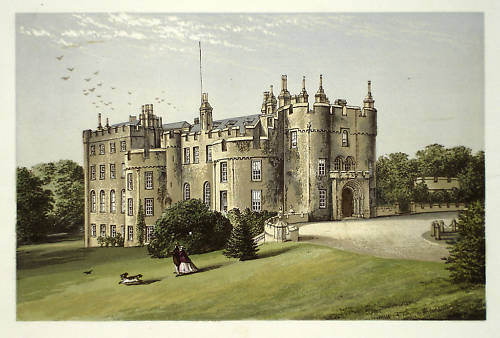
Picton Castle

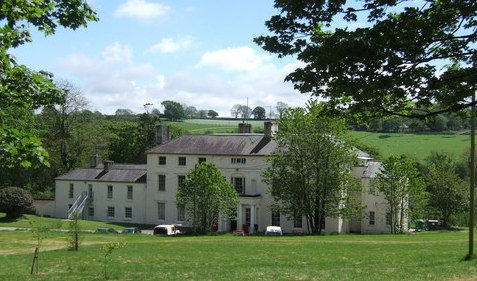
Sealyham House

=== Powys ===
- Abbey Cwmhir Hall
- Baynham Hall
- Calcott Hall
- Craig-y-Nos Castle
- Gliffaes Country House Hotel, Crickhowell
- Gregynog Hall
- Henblas
- Leighton Hall
- Lymore, (Montgomery). Demolished 1931
- Llangedwyn Hall
- Llangoed Hall
- Llysdinam
- Marrington Hall
- Maesmawr Hall
- Penoyre House
- Plas Dolguog
- Plas Machynlleth
- Porthmawr Country House, Crickhowell
- Powis Castle
- Treberfydd
- Tretower Court
- Trewern Hall
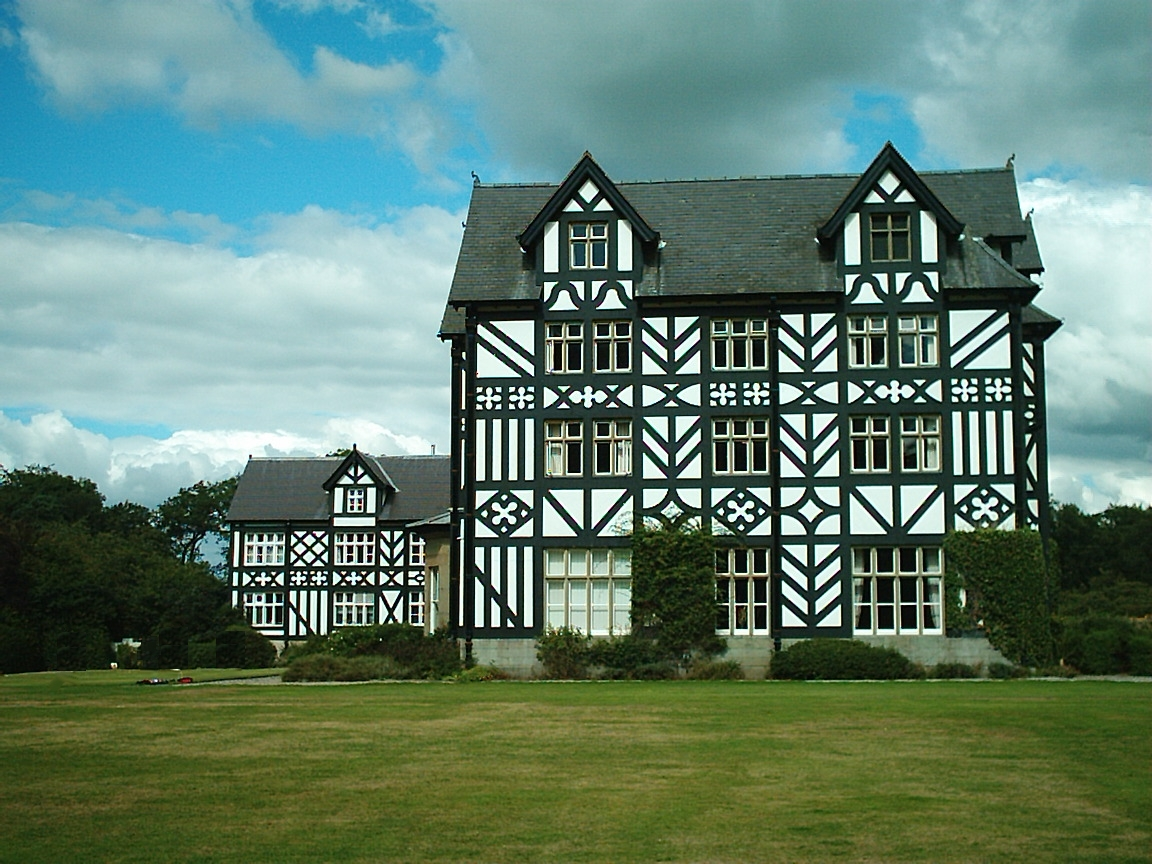
Gregynog Hall

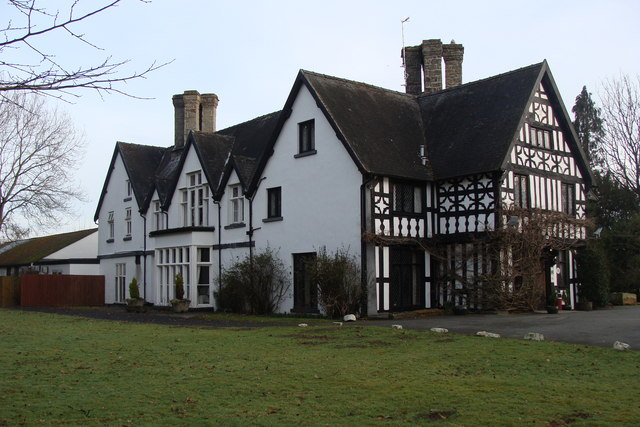
Maesmawr Hall

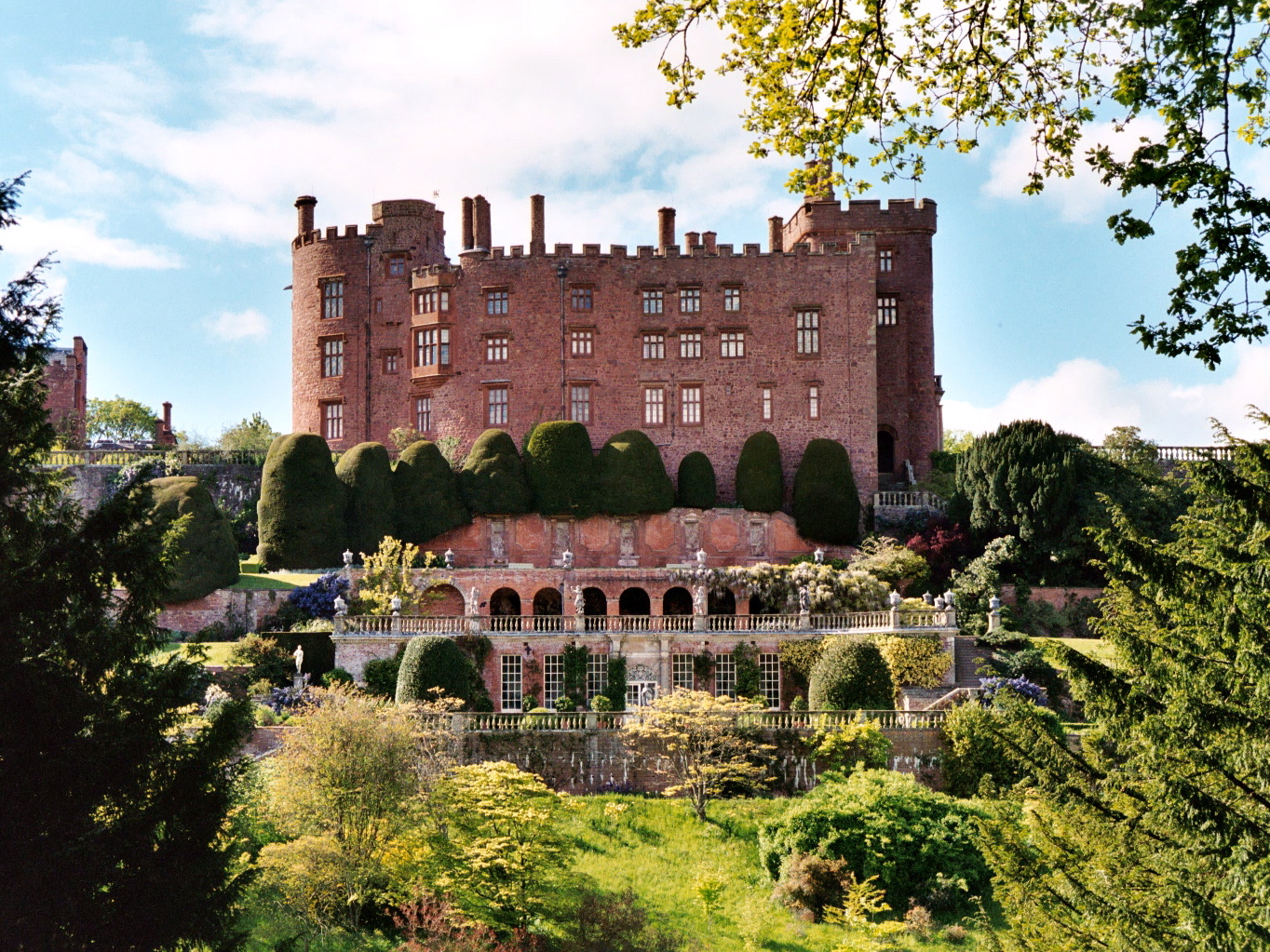
Powis Castle

=== Rhondda Cynon Taf ===
- Castellau House
- Llanharan House
- Miskin Manor
- Talygarn Manor

=== Swansea ===
- Clyne Castle
- Kilvrough Manor, Gower
- Maesteg House (demolished 1920)
- Oxwich Castle, Gower (ruined)
- Penllergaer House (demolished)
- Penrice Castle, Gower
- Singleton Abbey
- Sketty Hall
- Weobley Castle, Gower (ruined)

=== Vale of Glamorgan ===
- Barry Castle
- Bonvilston House
- Boverton Place
- Coedarhydyglyn
- Corntown Court
- Dimlands
- Dunraven Castle
- Dyffryn House
- Egerton Grey Country House Hotel, Barry
- Ewenny Priory
- Fonmon Castle
- Gileston Manor
- Great Frampton
- Hensol Castle
- Llandough Castle
- Llansannor Court
- Nash Manor
- Old Beaupre Castle
- Penllyn Castle
- Portobello House
- Pwllywrach
- St. Donat's Castle
- Tresillian House
- Wenvoe Castle
- Worlton Manor
- Wrinstone House
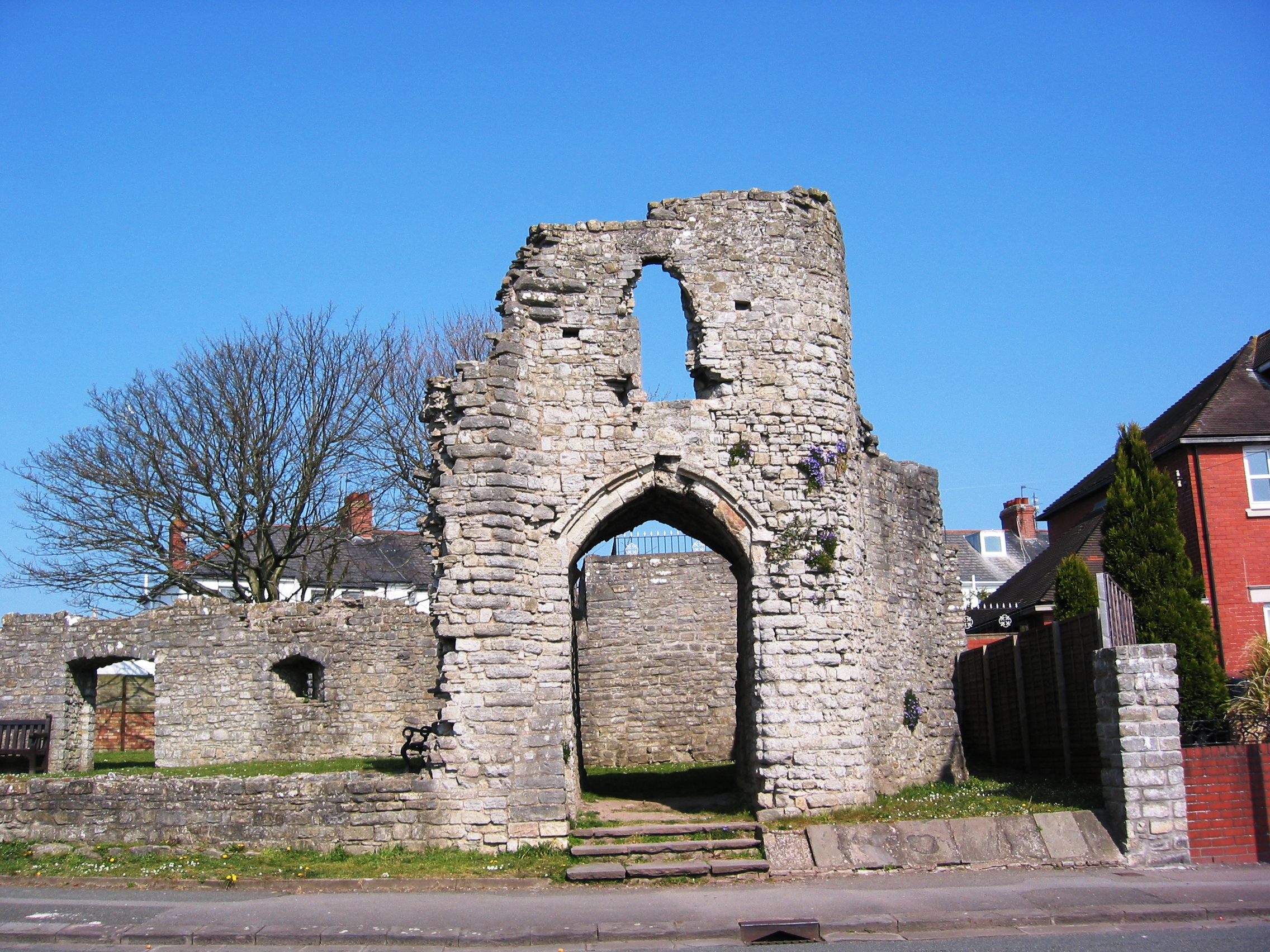
Barry Castle

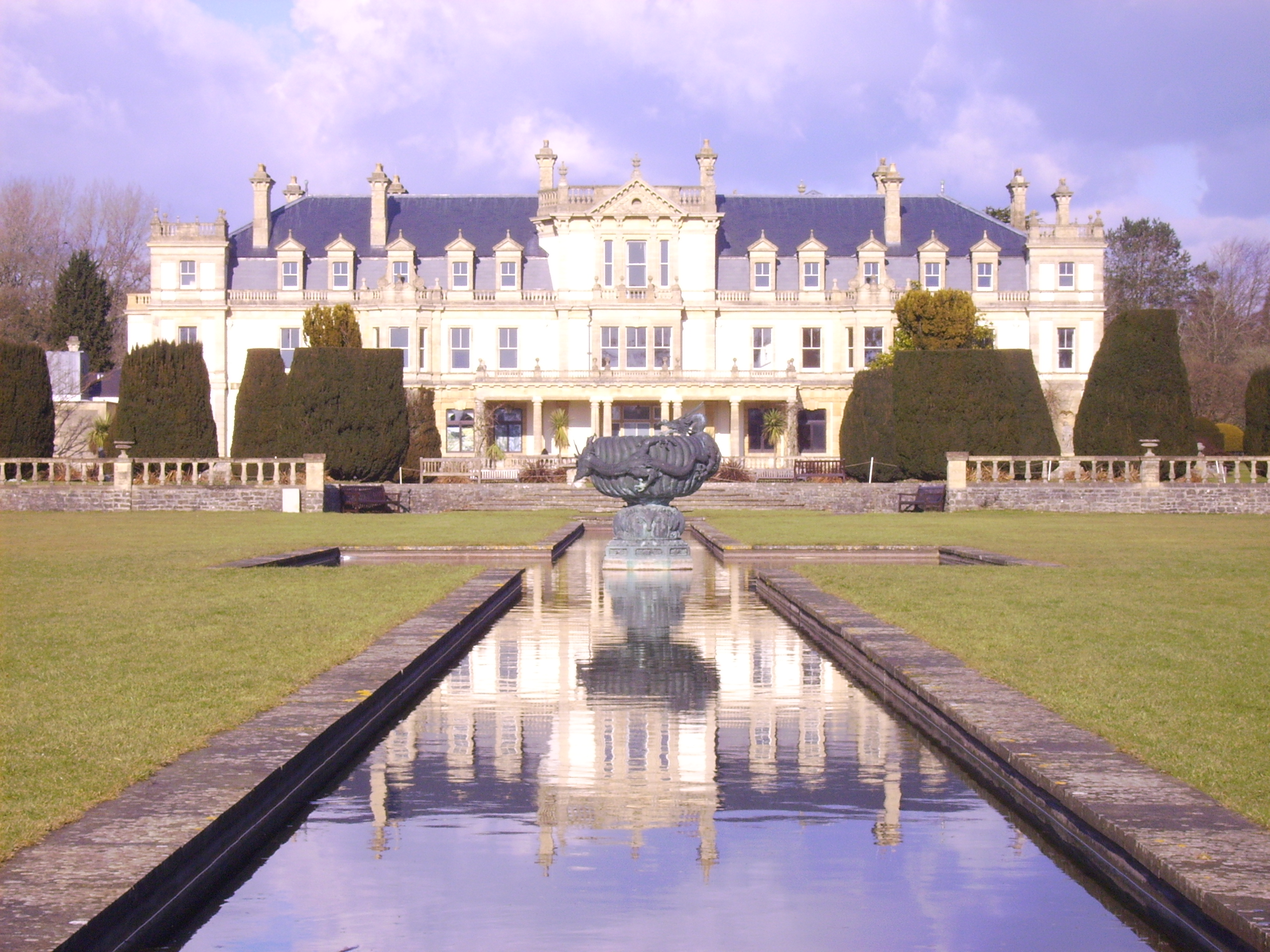
Dyffryn House

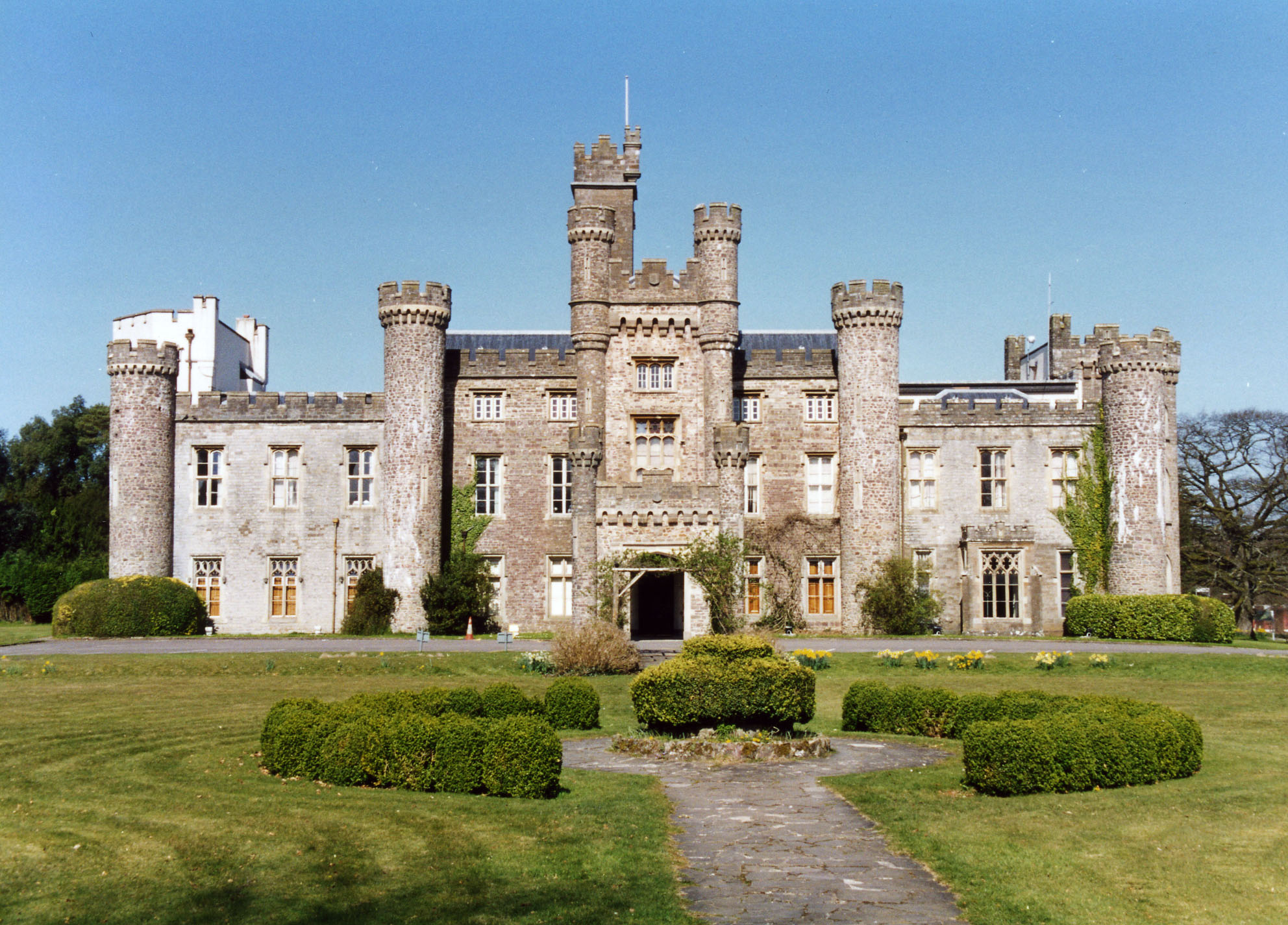
Hensol Castle

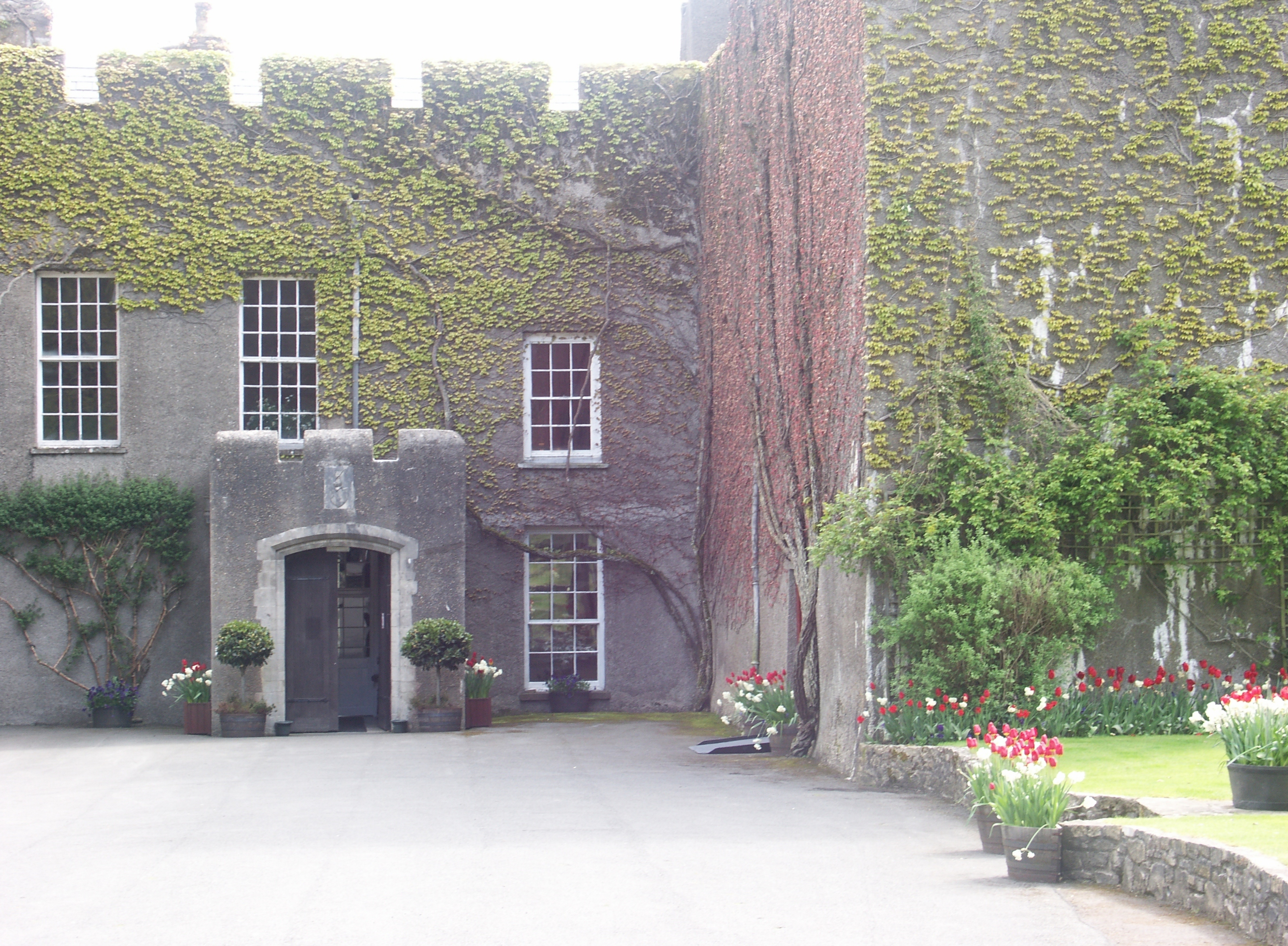
Fonmon Castle

=== Wrexham ===
- Acton Hall (demolished)
- Bettisfield Hall
- Bodidris Hall
- Borras Hall
- Bronwylfa Hall
- Brynyffynnon (demolished)
- Bryn Estyn Hall
- Bryn y Pys Hall (demolished)
- Brymbo Hall (demolished)
- Bryn y Grog
- Brynkinallt
- Caergwrle Castle (ruin)
- Cefn Park
- Chirk Castle
- Croesnewydd Hall
- Darland Hall
- Erbistock Hall
- Erddig Hall
- Erlas Hall
- Esclusham Hall
- Esless Hall
- Gerwyn Hall
- Gladwyn Hall
- Gresford Lodge
- Gwastad Hall
- Gwersyllt Hall (demolished)
- Gwersyllt Hill
- Hafod y Wern House
- Horsley Hall, Gresford (demolished)
- Iscoyd Park
- Little Acton House (demolished)
- Llyndir Hall
- Llwyn Isaf (demolished)
- Llwyn Onn
- Marchwiel Hall
- Pant yr Ochain
- Pendine Hall (demolished)
- Pen-y-Lan Hall
- Pentrebychan Hall (demolished)
- Pickhill Hall
- Plas Acton (demolished)
- Rossett Hall, Rossett
- Stansty Hall (demolished)
- The Mount (demolished)
- Trevalyn Hall
- Trevalyn Manor
- Wynnstay
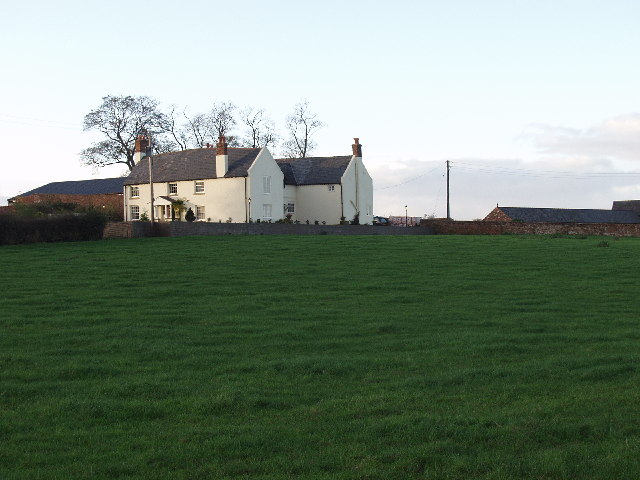
Borras Hall

Brymbo Hall

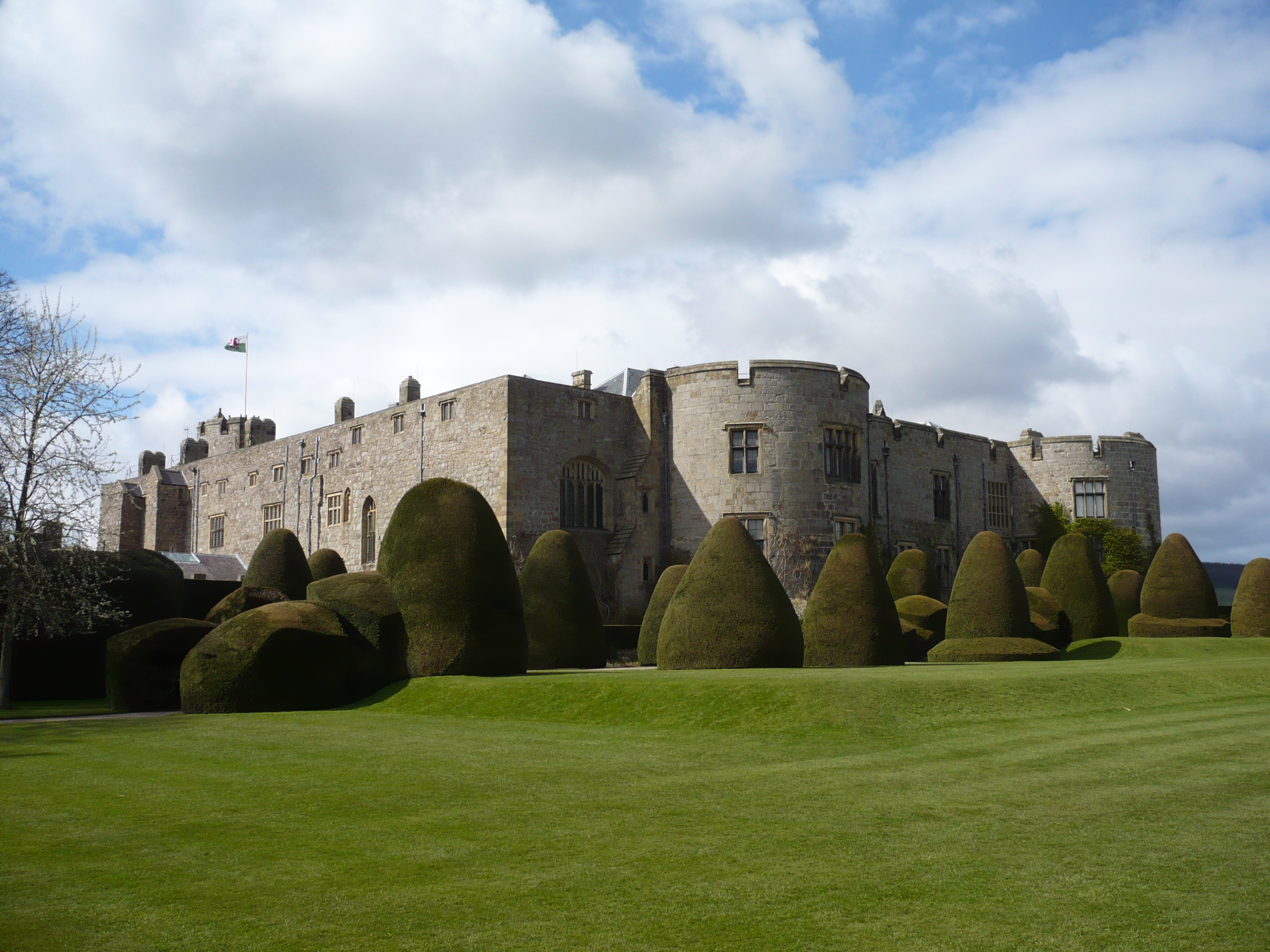
Chirk Castle

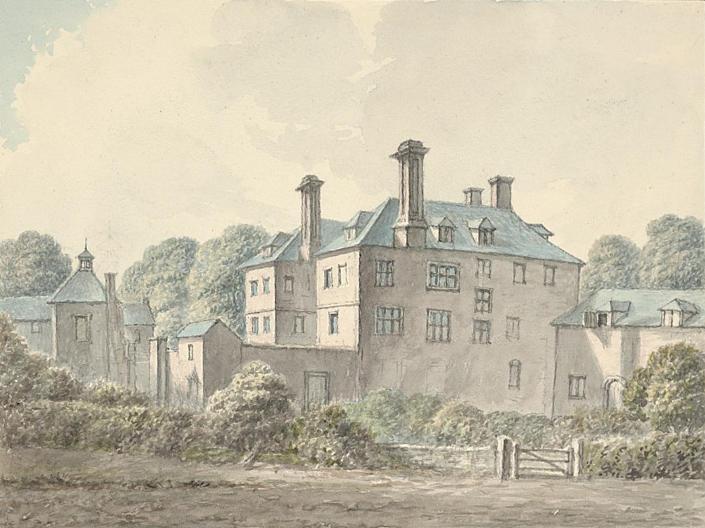
Croesnewydd Hall

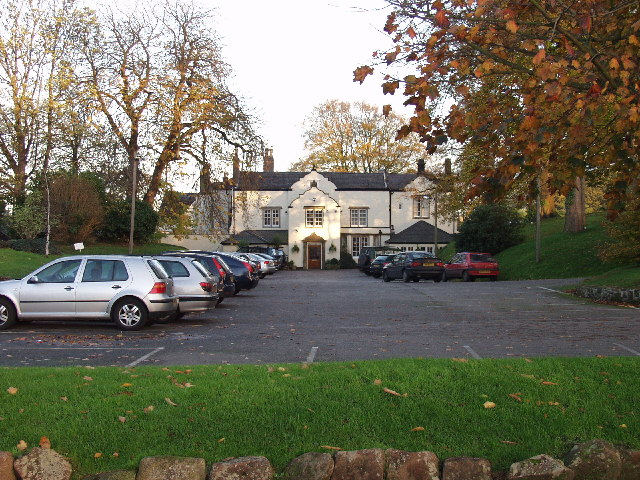
Pant-yr-Ochain

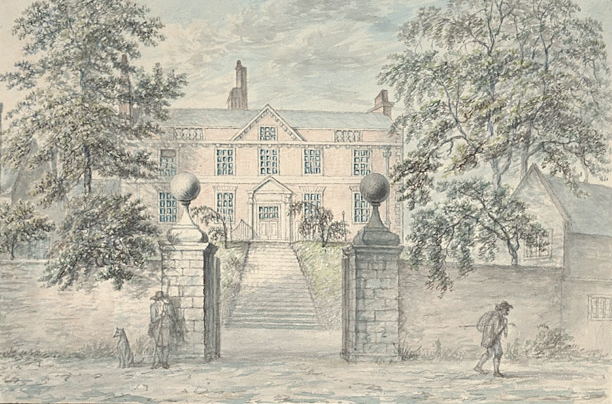
The Mount (demolished)

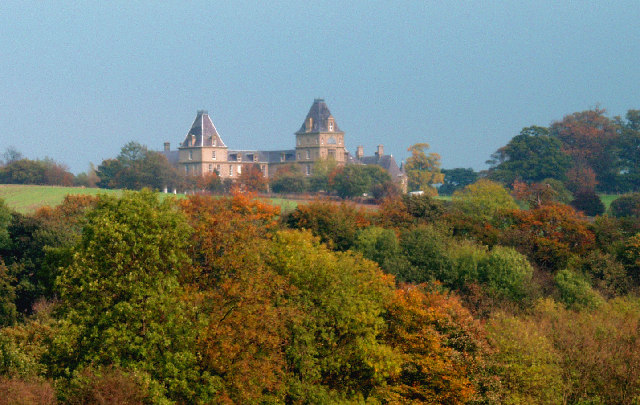
Wynnstay

== See also ==
- List of hotels in the United Kingdom
- List of family seats of English nobility
- List of family seats of Welsh nobility
- List of family seats of Scottish nobility
- List of family seats of Irish nobility
