= List of hotels in the United Kingdom =

This is a list of notable hotels and inns in the United Kingdom.

== England ==
=== Bedfordshire ===
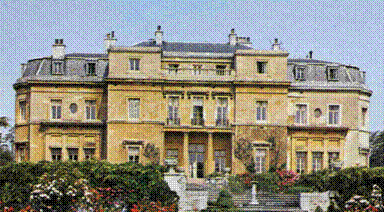
Luton Hoo

- Flitwick Manor, Flitwick
- Luton Hoo, Luton

=== Berkshire ===
- Aldermaston Court
- Berystede
- Coworth House
- Donnington Grove
- Elcot Park Hotel
- Great House at Sonning
- Monkey Island, Bray
- Oakley Court
- Royal Berkshire Hotel

==== Reading ====
- Roseate Reading
- The George Hotel
- Malmaison Hotel
- Millennium Madejski Hotel

=== City of Bristol ===
- Palace Hotel

=== Buckinghamshire ===
- Cliveden
- The Crown
- Danesfield House
- Hartwell House
- Skindles
- Jurys Inn Milton Keynes

=== Cambridgeshire ===
- The Bull Hotel, Cambridge
- The Bull Hotel, Peterborough
- George Hotel, Stamford
- Grange Hotel, Brampton
- Spinney Abbey

=== Cheshire ===
- Chester Grosvenor and Spa
- Crewe Hall
- Crown Hotel
- Higher Huxley Hall, Huxley
- Old Hall Hotel
- Peckforton Castle
- Queen Hotel, Chester
- Rookery Hall
- Rowton Hall

=== Cornwall ===
- Carbis Bay Hotel
- Chymorvah House, Marazion
- Costislost
- Falmouth Hotel
- Headland Hotel
- Jamaica Inn
- Mount Haven Hotel, Marazion
- Nansloe Manor
- The Sloop Inn
- Tregenna Castle

=== Cumbria ===
- Abbey House, Barrow-in-Furness
- Britannia Inn
- The Bull Hotel, Sedbergh
- Dalston Hall
- The Duke of Edinburgh Hotel
- Gilsland Spa
- Hipping Hall
- Howtown Hotel
- Moresby Hall
- Overwater Hall
- Rothay Manor, Ambleside
- Sharrow Bay
- Storrs Hall
- The Traveller's Rest, Grasmere
- Underscar Manor, Applethwaite
- Windermere Hotel

=== Derbyshire ===
- Breadsall Priory
- Callow Hall, Ashbourne
- Midland Hotel, Derby
- Old Hall Hotel
- St Helen's House

=== Devon ===
- 62-70 Victoria Street (demolished)
- The Barn, Exmouth
- Burgh Island Hotel
- Churston Court Inn
- Corbyn Head Hotel
- The Fisherman's Cot
- Gleneagles Hotel, Torquay (closed)
- The Grand Hotel, Torquay
- Howden Court Hotel, Torquay
- Royal Castle Hotel, Dartmouth
- The Three Crowns Hotel

=== Dorset ===
- Bournemouth Highcliff Marriott Hotel
- Cliff End Hotel (closed)
- Crown Hotel, Poole
- Durley Dean Hotel
- Gloucester House
- Gresham Court Hotel
- Haven Hotel
- Hermitage Hotel, Bournemouth
- King's Arms, Dorchester
- Langtry Manor
- Merley House, Wimborne
- Moonfleet Manor Hotel
- Mortons House Hotel, Corfe Castle
- Norfolk Royale Hotel
- Orchid Gardens Hotel (former)
- Riviera Hotel
- Royal Bath Hotel
- Royal Lion Hotel
- Sandbanks Hotel
- Three Cups Hotel

=== County Durham ===
- Blackwell Grange Hotel
- The Lord Crewe Arms Hotel
- Lumley Castle
- Seaham Hall

=== East Sussex ===
- Brickwall House Hotel
- Claremont (Burlington) Hotel
- Grand Hotel Eastbourne
- Horsted Place
- The Mermaid Inn

==== Brighton and Hove ====
- Bedford Hotel
- Grand Hotel
- Hilton Brighton Metropole
- Royal Albion Hotel

=== Gloucestershire ===
- Bibury Court
- Speech House
- Stonehouse Court Hotel
- Thornbury Castle
- Tortworth Court

=== Greater London ===
- 41 Hotel
- Abbey Court Hotel
- The Academy
- The Athenaeum Hotel
- Baglioni Hotel
- Bell Savage Inn
- The Bentley London
- The Berkeley
- Blakes Hotel
- Brown's Hotel
- Canary Riverside Plaza
- Capital Hotel
- Carlton Hotel, London
- Charlotte Street Hotel
- The Chelsea Townhouse
- Churchill Hotel
- Claridge's
- Colonnade Hotel, London
- The Connaught
- Courthouse Hotel
- Covent Garden Hotel
- The Dorchester
- 100 Queen's Gate Hotel London
- Driscoll House
- Durrants
- Egerton House Hotel
- Four Seasons Hotel London at Park Lane
- Franklin Hotel, London
- Goring Hotel
- Grange Holborn Hotel
- Grosvenor House Hotel
- Halkin Hotel
- Hazlitt's
- Hempel Hotel
- Hilton London Metropole
- Hilton London Paddington
- Hotel Cecil
- Hotel Russell
- InterContinental London
- Jumeirah Carlton Tower
- The Landmark London
- The Lanesborough
- Langham Hotel, London
- London Hilton on Park Lane
- Mandarin Oriental Hyde Park, London
- Marriott London Park Lane
- Marriott West India Quay
- Le Meridien Hotel Piccadilly
- Metropole Hotel, London
- Millennium Bailey's Hotel
- Millennium Hotel Mayfair
- One Aldwych
- Orchard Court
- Park Lane Hotel
- Park Lane Mews Hotel
- Radisson Blu Edwardian Hampshire Hotel
- Radisson Blu Edwardian Heathrow Hotel
- Rafayel on the Left Bank
- Renaissance Chancery Court Hotel
- Ritz Hotel
- Royal Garden Hotel
- Royal Horseguards Hotel
- Samarkand Hotel
- San Domenico House
- Sanderson Hotel
- Savoy Hotel
- Selsdon Park Hotel
- Sheraton Park Tower Hotel
- Sheraton Skyline Hotel at London Heathrow
- Sofitel St. James
- Soho Hotel
- St James's Club and Hotel
- St. Pancras Renaissance London Hotel
- Strand Palace Hotel
- Swissôtel The Howard
- Threadneedles Hotel
- Tower Hotel, London
- Trafalgar Hilton
- Waldorf Hilton
- YOTEL

=== Greater Manchester ===
==== Manchester ====
- Chancellors Hotel & Conference Centre
- Free Trade Hall
- Midland Hotel, Manchester
- Refuge Assurance Building
- Watts Warehouse
- Corn Exchange, Manchester

==== Salford ====
- Lowry Hotel

=== Hampshire ===
- Balmer Lawn
- Chewton Glen
- Hotel Terravina
- Lainston House
- Queens Hotel, Southsea

=== Herefordshire ===
- Burton Court, Eardisland
- The Chase Hotel, Ross-On-Wye
- Glewstone Court Hotel
- Rhydspence Inn
- The Stagg Inn
- Sun Inn

=== Hertfordshire ===
- The Brocket Arms
- Brocket Hall
- Fanhams Hall
- The Grove, Watford
- Hanbury Manor
- Hunton Park
- Sopwell House

=== Isle of Wight ===
- Farringford House

=== Kent ===
- The Grand Burstin Hotel
- Hotel du Vin, Tunbridge Wells
- Larkfield Priory Hotel
- Fleur de Lis Hotel

=== Lancashire ===
- The Cartford Inn
- The Imperial Hotel Blackpool
- Midland Hotel, Morecambe
- Norbreck Castle Hotel
- Whitewell Hotel

=== Leicestershire ===
- Bosworth Hall, Market Bosworth
- The City Rooms, Leicester
- Grand Hotel, Leicester
- Hilton, Leicester
- Kilworth House
- Leicester Marriott

=== Lincolnshire ===
- Stoke Rochford Hall

=== Merseyside ===
- Hill Bark
- Thornton Manor

==== Liverpool ====
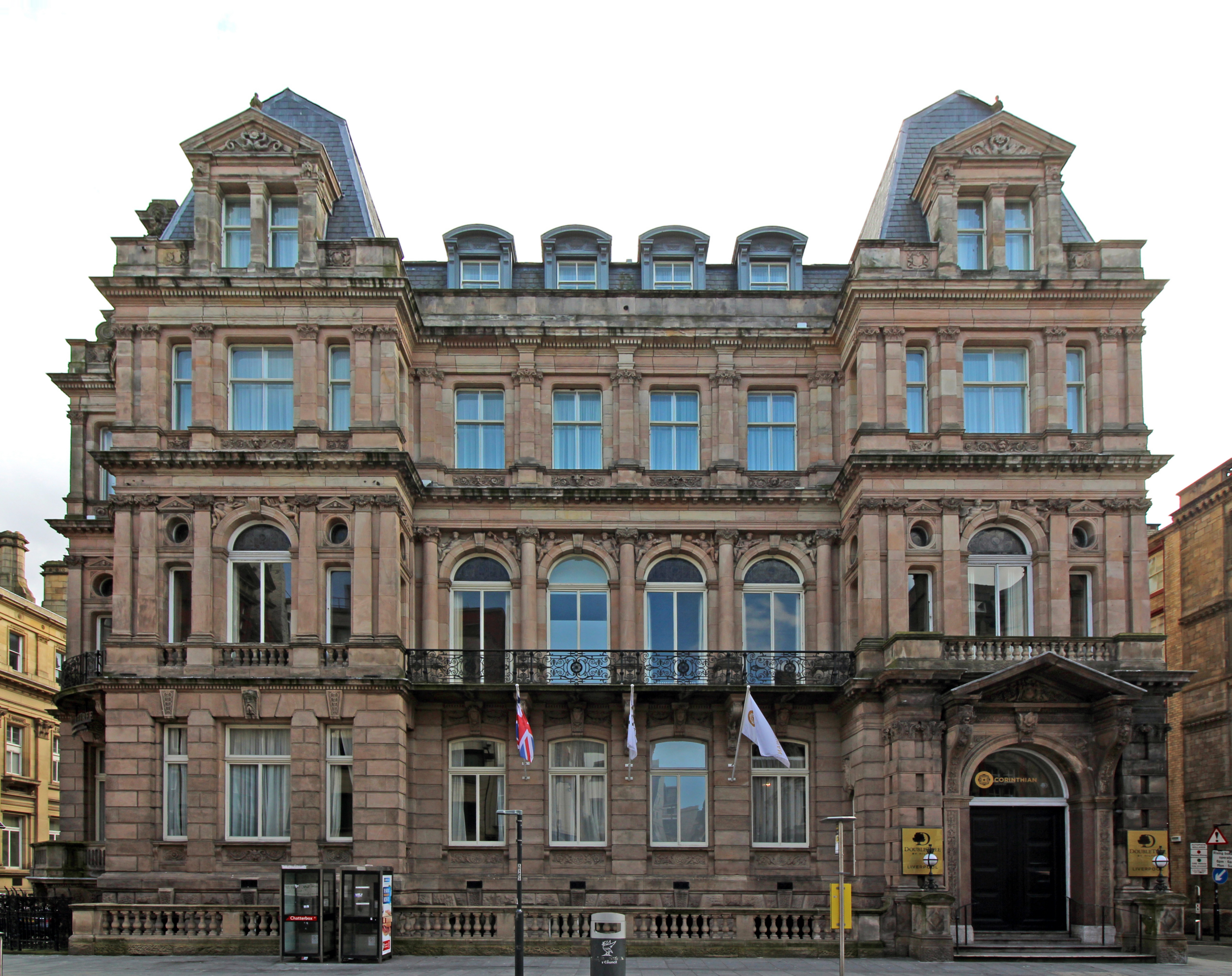
Doubletree Hilton, Municipal Annexe

- The Municipal Hotel and Spa
- 30 James St
- 62 Castle St
- Britannia Adelphi Hotel
- Crowne Plaza Liverpool John Lennon Airport Hotel
- Hampton by Hilton Liverpool John Lennon Airport
- Hard Days Night Hotel
- Hope Street Hotel
- Malmaison Hotel
- Doubletree Hilton
- Radisson Red
- Marriott Aloft
- Thistle Atlantic Tower

=== Norfolk ===
- Bell Hotel, Thetford
- Cliftonville Hotel, Cromer
- Dales Country House Hotel, Upper Sheringham
- Duke's Head Hotel, King's Lynn
- Dunston Hall Hotel
- Durdans, Mundesley
- George Hotel, Swaffham
- Golden Lion Hotel, Hunstanton
- Griffin Hotel, Attleborough
- Hotel de Paris, Cromer
- The Lifeboat Inn, Thornham
- Links Hotel, West Runton
- Lynford Hall
- Maids Head Hotel, Norwich
- Manor Hotel, Mundesley
- The Red Lion Hotel, Cromer
- Royal Hotel, Great Yarmouth
- Sandcliff Hotel, Cromer
- Sea Marge Hotel, Overstrand
- Sprowston Manor
- Star Hotel, Great Yarmouth

=== Northamptonshire ===
- Talbot Hotel, Oundle

=== Northumberland ===
- Clennell Hall, Clennell
- Embleton Hall, Morpeth
- Langley Castle Hotel
- Marshall Meadows Country House Hotel, near Berwick-upon-Tweed
- Matfen Hall Hotel, Matfen
- Otterburn Hall Hotel, Otterburn
- Schooner Hotel, Alnmouth
- The White Swan Hotel, Alnwick

=== North Yorkshire ===
- Clifton Hotel
- Crown Spa Hotel
- Grand Hotel, Scarborough
- Hazlewood Castle
- Holbeck Hall Hotel
- DoubleTree by Hilton Harrogate Majestic Hotel & Spa
- The King's Arms Hotel, Reeth
- Middlethorpe Hall
- Old Swan Hotel
- Swinton Park Hotel

=== Oxfordshire ===
- Bear Hotel
- French Horn, Sonning Eye
- Holt Hotel
- Le Manoir aux Quat' Saisons

==== Oxford ====
- Eastgate Hotel
- Randolph Hotel, Oxford
- The Old Bank Hotel, Oxford
- Oxford Castle

=== Rutland ===
- Hambleton Hall

=== Shropshire ===
- The Bull Hotel, Ludlow
- Feathers Hotel, Ludlow
- Fitz Manor
- The Royal Victoria Hotel
- Soulton Hall

=== Somerset ===
- Ashwick House (near Dulverton)
- Babington House
- Castle Hotel, Taunton
- Empire Hotel, Bath
- George Hotel and Pilgrims' Inn, Glastonbury
- Ston Easton Park
- Tasburgh House Hotel

=== South Yorkshire ===
- Adelphi Hotel, Sheffield
- Aston Hall

=== Staffordshire ===
- Etruria Hall
- The Gungate Hotel Tamworth, Staffordshire
- North Stafford Hotel

=== Surrey ===
- Burford Bridge Hotel
- Great Fosters
- Lakeside Leisure Complex
- Pennyhill Park Hotel

=== Warwickshire ===
- The Belfry
- Coombe Abbey
- Lord Leycester Hotel
- The Regent Hotel

=== West Midlands ===
==== Birmingham ====
- Grand Hotel, Birmingham
- Hyatt Regency Birmingham
- Jurys Inn Birmingham
- Moor Hall Hotel
- New Hall Manor
- Penns Hall
- The Pitman Vegetarian Hotel
- Snowhill

=== West Sussex ===
- Amberley Castle, Amberley
- The George Hotel, Crawley
- Mannings Heath Golf Club
- South Lodge Hotel

=== West Yorkshire ===
- 42 The Calls
- George Hotel, Huddersfield
- The Met Hotel, Leeds
- Midland Hotel, Bradford
- Oakwood Hall
- Park Plaza Hotel Leeds
- Quebecs Hotel, Leeds
- Queens Hotel, Leeds
- Wood Hall Country House Hotel

=== Wiltshire ===
- Bishopstrow House
- The Black Swan Hotel, Devizes
- Guyers House Hotel
- Littlecote House
- Manor House Hotel
- The Old Bell
- Whatley Manor

=== Worcestershire ===
- Chateau Impney
- Fownes Hotel and Restaurant

== Northern Ireland ==
=== Belfast ===
- Europa Hotel
- Grand Central Hotel
- Malmaison Hotel
- Merchant Hotel
- Ten Square

=== County Antrim ===
- Ballygally Castle

=== County Armagh ===
- Tí Chulainn

=== County Fermanagh ===
- Killyhevlin Hotel
- Manor House Resort Hotel

== Scotland ==
=== Aberdeenshire ===
- Craigendarroch Resort
- Cruden Bay Hotel
- Waverley Hotel

=== Angus ===
- Kinnettles Castle

=== Argyll and Bute ===
- Argyll Hotel
- Balmory Hall
- Barcaldine Castle
- Barcaldine House
- Colintraive Hotel
- George Hotel
- Glenburn Hotel
- Hunters Quay Hotel
- Oban Hydro
- Queen's Hotel
- Royal Marine Hotel
- Tiroran Country House Hotel
- Whistlefield Inn

=== Dumfries and Galloway ===
- Auchen Castle Hotel
- Cally Palace
- Corsewall Lighthouse
- North West Castle

=== East Lothian ===
- Carberry Tower
- Greywalls

=== Edinburgh ===
- Balmoral Hotel
- Dalmahoy
- The Dunstane
- The George Hotel, Edinburgh
- The Glasshouse
- Hotel Indigo Edinburgh
- Prestonfield House
- Salisbury Green
- The Scotsman Hotel
- Tailor's Hall
- Waldorf Astoria Edinburgh - The Caledonian
- Waterloo Hotel

=== Fife ===
- Balbirnie House
- Fairmont St Andrews
- Old Course Hotel
- Rufflets Hotel
- Rusacks Hotel

=== Glasgow ===
- Bellgrove Hotel
- Beresford Hotel
- Central Hotel
- Crowne Plaza Glasgow
- Elmbank Gardens
- Hilton Glasgow
- One Devonshire Gardens
- St Andrew House

=== Highland ===
- Ackergill Tower
- The Albannach
- Clachaig Inn
- Drumossie Hotel
- Glenelg Inn
- Huna House
- Inverlochy Castle Hotel
- Kings House Hotel
- Kinloch Lodge
- The Lovat Hotel
- Scottish Highlander (barge)
- Tulloch Castle

=== North Ayrshire ===
- Burnhouse Manor

=== Perth and Kinross ===
- Ballathie House
- Atholl Arms Hotel (Blair Atholl)
- Atholl Arms Hotel (Dunkeld)
- Crieff Hydro
- Cromlix House
- Dunalastair Hotel
- Gleneagles Hotel
- Parklands Hotel
- Perth Arms Hotel
- Queens Hotel
- Royal George Hotel
- Salutation Hotel
- Station Hotel
- Taybank Hotel

=== Renfrewshire ===
- Erskine Bridge Hotel & Spa
- Mar Hall
- Normandy Hotel

=== Scottish Borders ===
- Crook Inn
- Dryburgh Abbey Hotel
- Peebles Hydro
- Stobo Castle

=== South Ayrshire ===
- Glenapp Castle
- Turnberry Hotel

=== South Lanarkshire ===
- Shieldhill Castle

== Wales ==
=== Bridgend ===
- Seabank Hotel, Porthcawl

=== Cardiff ===
- Angel Hotel
- Cardiff Marriott Hotel
- Copthorne Hotel, Cardiff
- Helmont House
- Hilton Cardiff
- Royal Hotel
- St David's Hotel & Spa

=== Carmarthenshire ===
- Brown's Hotel, Laugharne

=== Ceredigion ===
- Castle Hotel, Aberaeron
- Harbourmaster Hotel, Aberaeron

=== Conwy ===
- Bodysgallen Hall
- Castle Hotel

=== Denbighshire ===
- Owain Glyndwr Hotel, Corwen

=== Flintshire ===
- Northop Hall Country House Hotel

=== Gwynedd ===
- Black Boy Inn, Caernarfon
- Bryn Bras Castle, Llanrug
- Corbett Arms Hotel, Tywyn
- Deep Sleep Hotel, Cwmorthin quarry
- Glynllifon, Llandwrog
- The Hotel Portmeirion, Portmeirion
- Oakeley Arms Hotel, Maentwrog
- Pen-y-Gwryd Hotel
- Plas Dinas
- St David's Hotel, Harlech

=== Isle of Anglesey ===
- The Bull Hotel, Llangefni

=== Monmouthshire ===
- The Glen-yr-Afon House Hotel, Usk
- The Angel Hotel, Abergavenny
- The Angel Hotel, Monmouth
- The Beaufort Arms Hotel, Monmouth
- The Beaufort Hotel, Chepstow
- The Crown at Whitebrook
- George Hotel, Chepstow
- Kings Head Hotel, Monmouth
- Llanwenarth House
- The Mayhill Hotel, Monmouth
- The Riverside Hotel, Monmouth
- Royal George Hotel, Tintern

=== Newport ===
- Celtic Manor Resort

=== Pembrokeshire ===
- Cobourg Hotel, Tenby (defunct)
- Penally Abbey

=== Powys ===
- Craig-y-Nos Castle
- Llangoed Hall, Llyswen
- Maesmawr Hall

=== Rhondda Cynon Taf ===
- Miskin Manor

=== Swansea ===
- Morgans Hotel, Swansea

=== Vale of Glamorgan ===
- Barry Hotel
- Egerton Grey Country House Hotel, Barry
- Portobello House, near Ogmore-by-Sea

=== Wrexham ===
- Rossett Hall, Rossett
- Wynnstay Arms Hotel, Ruabon
- Wynnstay Arms Hotel, Wrexham

== See also ==
- List of country houses in the United Kingdom
- Lists of hotels – an index of hotel list articles on Wikipedia
