= Three Cups Hotel =

Hotel in Lyme Regis, Dorset, England

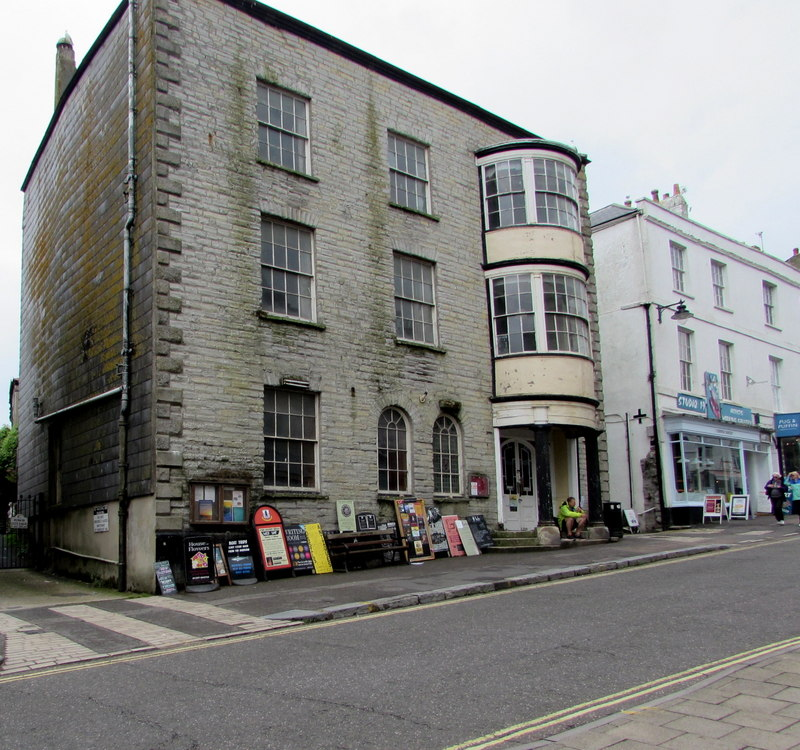

- Location within Dorset

General information
- Location: 15 - 19 Broad Street, Lyme Regis, Dorset, England
- Coordinates: 50°43′28″N 2°56′5″W

The Three Cups Hotel is a hotel in Lyme Regis, Dorset, England. It lies across the street from the Royal Lion Hotel. It became a listed building on 23 April 1952.

It has associations with many famous literary and historical figures. It is believed that Jane Austen stayed in Hiscott's Boarding house on the same site in 1804. The front section of the current building dates from 1807. The hotel has played host to many famous and influential people including Alfred Lord Tennyson, Henry Wadsworth Longfellow, Hilaire Belloc, G.K. Chesterton and J. R. R. Tolkien who spent several holidays there. In 1944, General Eisenhower delivered an important briefing to senior officers in the first floor lounge prior to D-Day. The building is of significant architectural and historical interest being mentioned in Pevsner's Buildings of England volume on Dorset. The hotel was used in the making of the film The French Lieutenant’s Woman in 1981, featuring Jeremy Irons and Meryl Streep. The current owners, Palmers Brewery of Bridport closed the hotel in May 1990 and have announced plans to demolish the significantly historic rear of the building and replace it with retail units, restaurant, visitor and private accommodation. It has since fallen into a derelict state and a campaign has been launched to restore and reopen the hotel because of its importance to the history of Lyme Regis.
