= Cliff End Hotel =

Demolished hotel in Bournemouth, Dorset, England

Coordinates: 50.72271°N 1.849°W

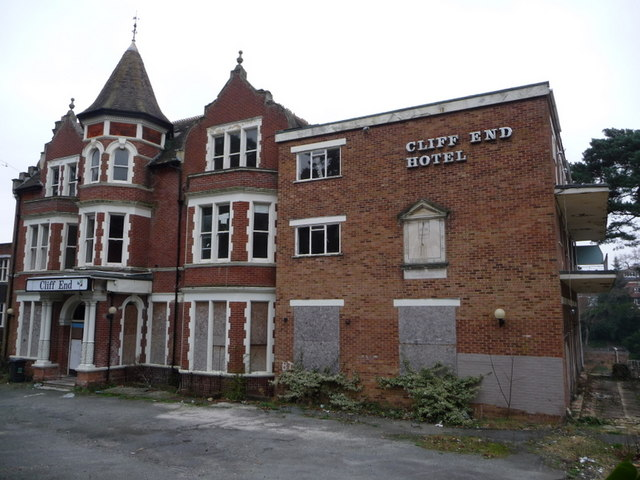
- The hotel pictured in 2009

General information
- Architectural style: Victorian
- Location: Manor Road, Bournemouth, United Kingdom
- Year built: 1887
- Closed: 2002
- Demolished: 2019

The Cliff End Hotel was a historic hotel in the Boscombe area of Bournemouth, Dorset, England.

== History ==
The Cliff End Hotel was built in 1887 and was one of the biggest and most grand hotels in the area. The hotel was constructed for the jeweller H Samuel. The hotel closed in 2002 and remained abandoned for 10 years. In 2012, the hotel was destroyed in a lightning strike. The building continued to remain vacant. The building, owned by Meyrick Estate, attracted squatters and vandals over the years. Local councillors and neighbours protested at the lack of progress on the building. Proposals were made for the replacement of the site with retirement flats. In March 2019, the demolition of the hotel commenced. The Bournemouth Civic Society objected to the demolition. As of 2024, the site is empty pending redevelopment.

== Gallery ==
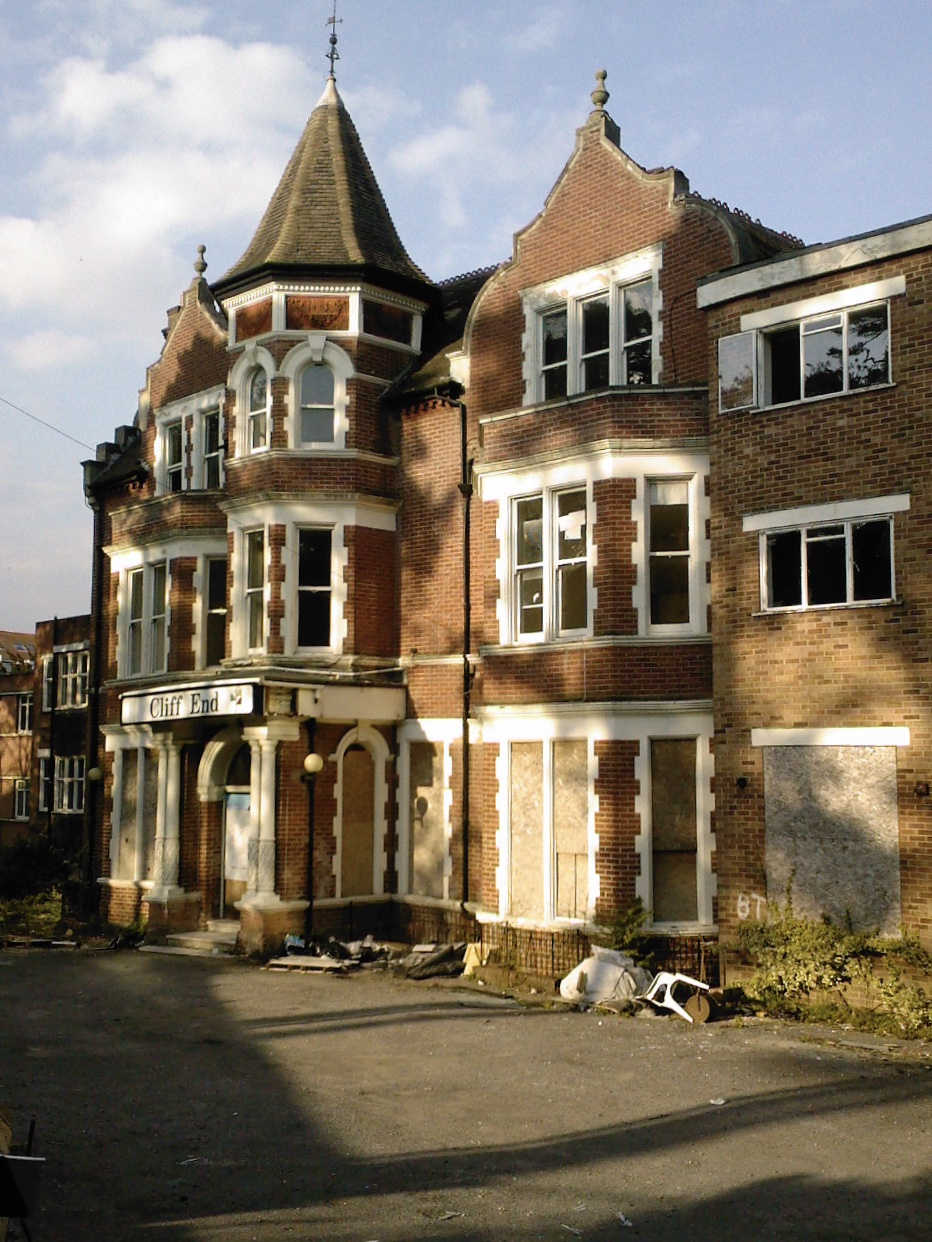
Cliff End Hotel in 2006

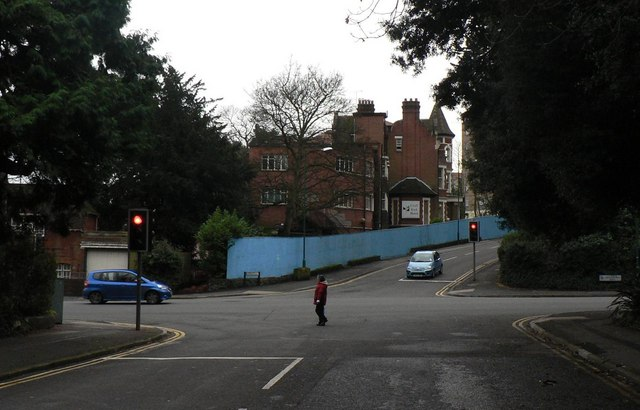
Cliff End Hotel in 2008

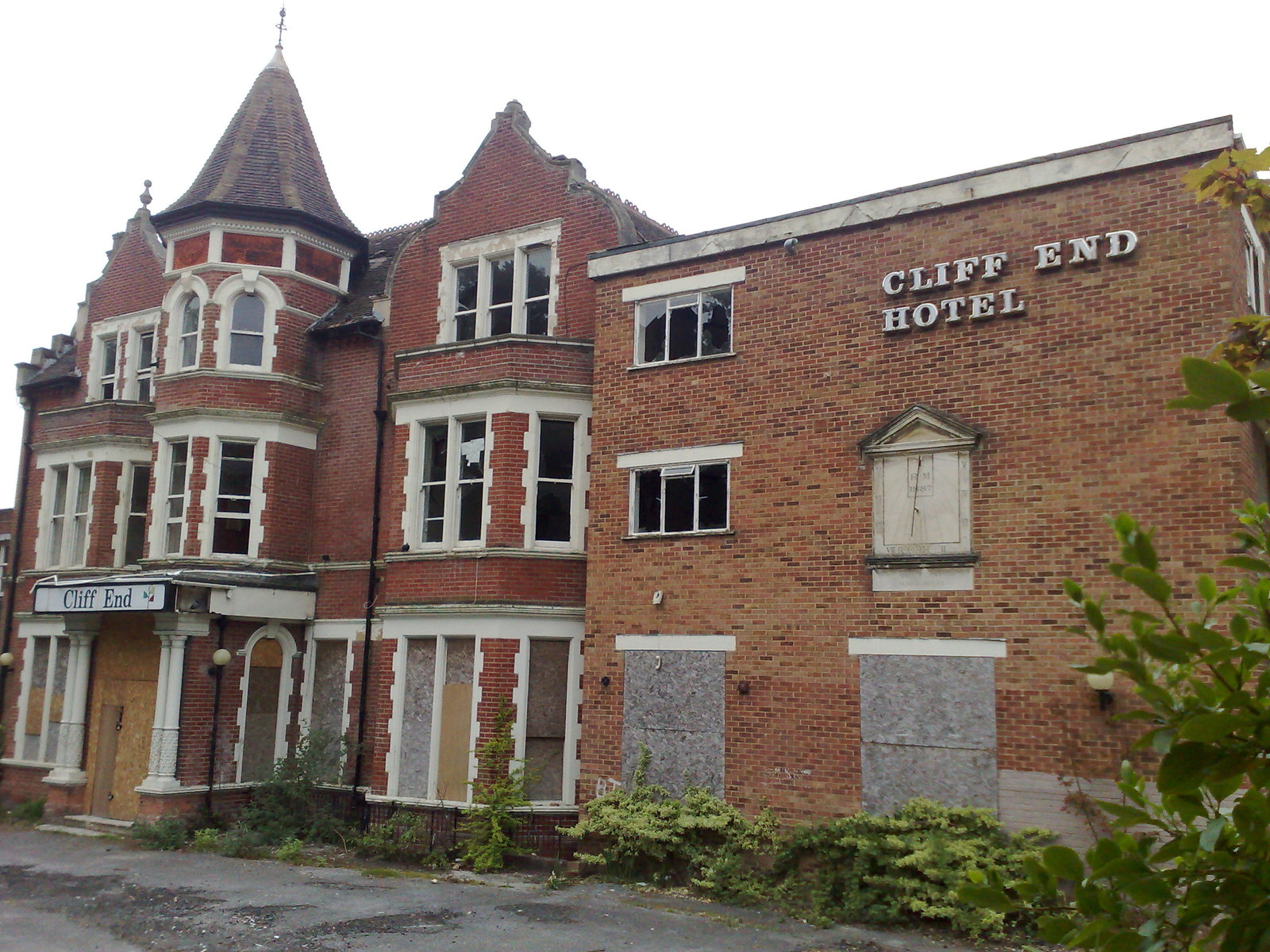
Cliff End Hotel in 2010

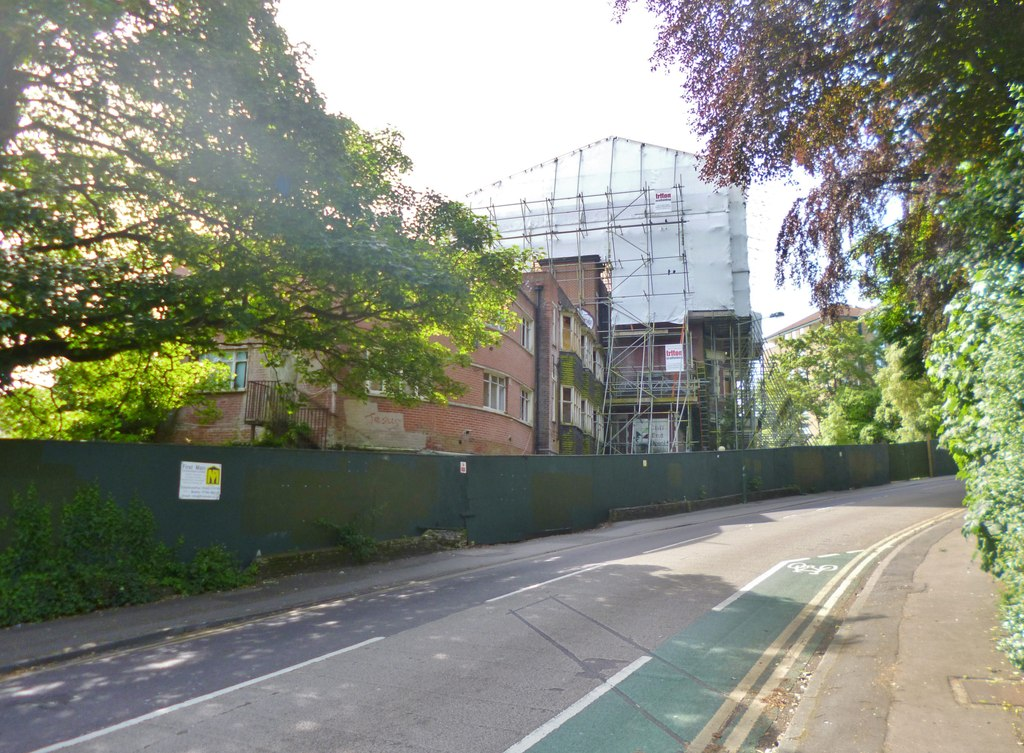
Cliff End Hotel in 2014

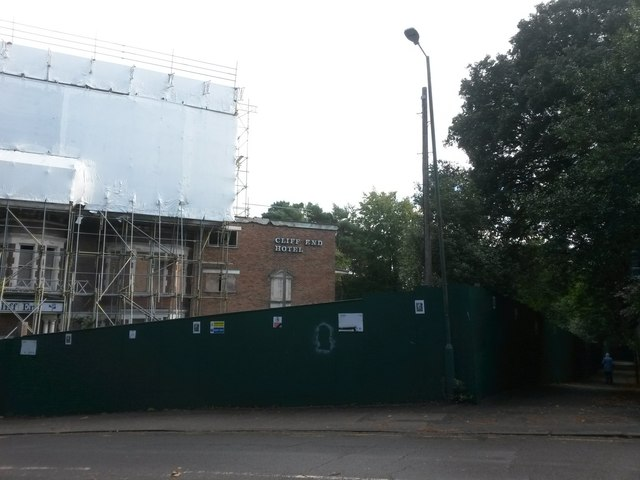
Cliff End Hotel in 2016

== See also ==
- List of hotels in the United Kingdom
