= Fleur de Lis Hotel =

Hotel in Canterbury

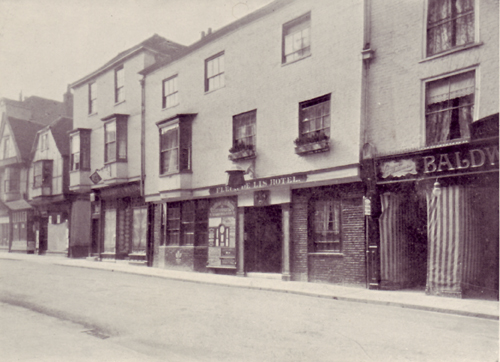
- Fleur de Lis Hotel
- Interactive map of the Fleur de Lis Hotel area

General information
- Location: Canterbury, Kent, England, 34 High Street
- Coordinates: 51°16′46″N 1°4′45″E
- Opening: 13th Century
- Closed: 1958

Technical details
- Floor count: 3

Other information
- Number of restaurants: 1

Fleur de Lis Hotel was a 13th century hotel in the city of Canterbury, Kent, England. It is recorded that Charles Dickens stayed there. The hotel was eventually demolished in 1958.

== History ==
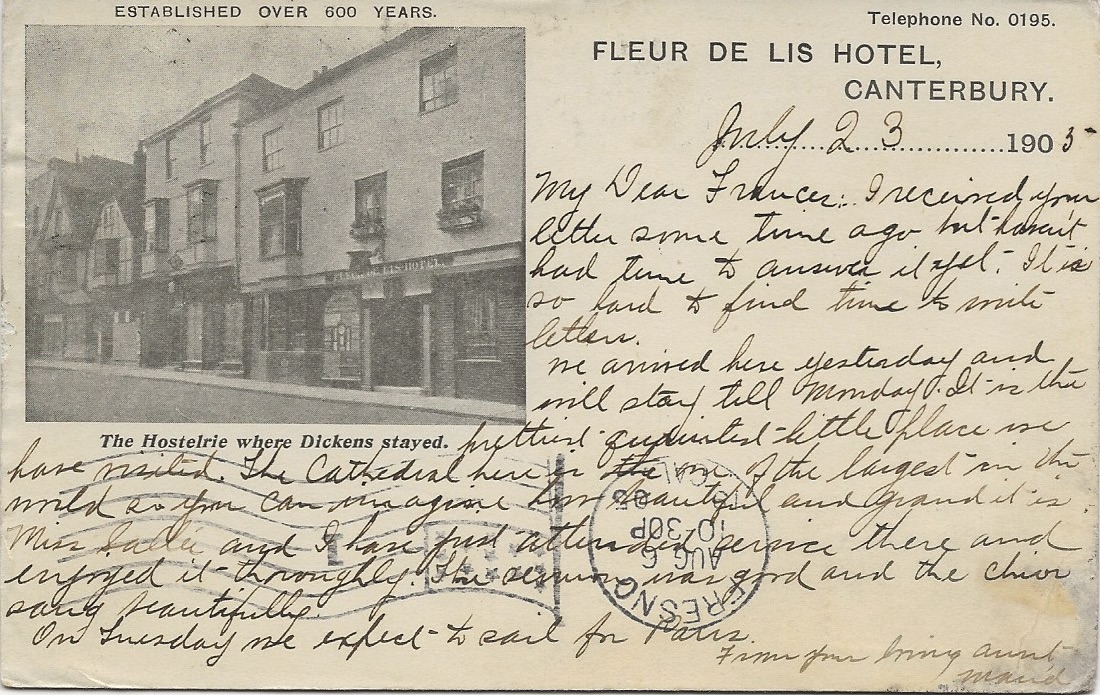
1905 Post Card of the Fleur de Lis Hotel, Canterbury.

Fleur de Lys decorative symbol is displayed under the windows at the front of the hotel.

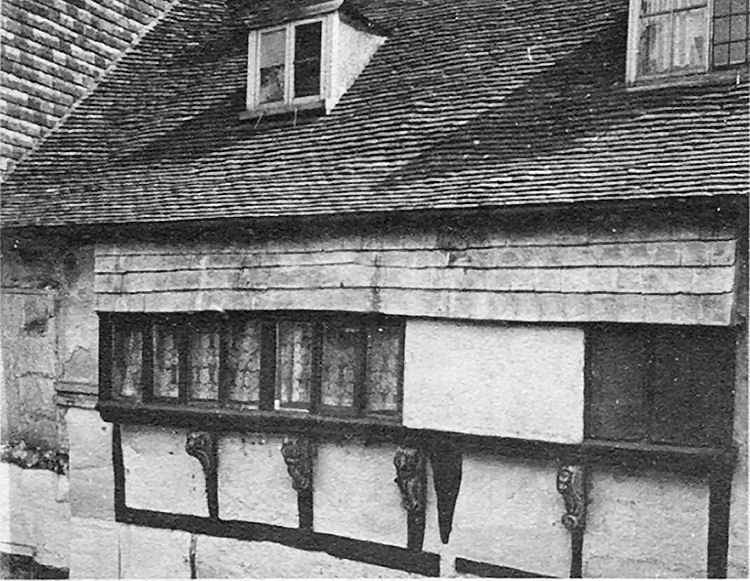
1895 photograph shows the windows and carved corbels in the courtyard of Fleur de Lis Hotel.

The hotel is mentioned as early as 1376. In the back of the building was a livery stable and the Fleur de Lis tap, which can be dated to 1372. An engraving from 1808 on a post card shows the 13th century windows in the courtyard of the hotel with carved corbels. The same corbels can be seen in a 1895 photograph that show the back of the building next to The Cherry Tree Freehouse pub on 10 White Horse Lane.

On September 14, 1872, the Mayor's annual banquet was held at the Fleur de Lis Hotel, by the landlord Samuel Prentice. The room was decorated with flowers and plants that were supplied by the Earl of Mountcharles, Captain Lambert, and Mr. Mount. Those that were in attendance were the aldermen and councilors, including Canterbury Mayor George Furley.

On September 8, 1910, Ben Twyman sold the hotel and several lots. At that time, there was still a livery stable in the back and the Fleur de Lis tap.

Today, the Fleur de Lis tap is the home of the Cherry Tree Freehouse pub at 10 White Horse Lane.

== See also ==
- List of hotels in Kent
- List of mayors of Canterbury
