= Orchid Gardens Hotel =

Former hotel in Bournemouth, Dorset, England

- Location within Dorset
- Alternative names: Woodcroft Tower Hotel

General information
- Status: Destroyed
- Type: Hotel
- Architectural style: Victorian
- Location: Gervis Road, East Cliff, Bournemouth, Dorset, England
- Coordinates: 50.7195°N 1.8676°W
- Year built: 19th century

Technical details
- Floor count: 4

The Orchid Gardens Hotel, also known as the Woodcroft Tower Hotel, was a historic hotel on Gervis Road in the East Cliff area of Bournemouth, Dorset, England. Vacated after going into administration in 2013, the building later fell into disuse and was largely destroyed by a major fire in September 2020, which investigators subsequently said was deliberate.

== History ==
The site is owned by the Meyrick Estate. The hotel was formerly named the Woodcroft Tower Hotel. Legacy Hotels & Resorts took over the hotel in 2012. The building was vacated in 2013 after the hotel went into administration. The site was purchased by the neighbouring Orchid Hotel and it was used for storage and car parking. The former hotel was reportedly occupied by squatters. The building was warned to be a fire risk. A fire was reported in June 2018.

On 24 September 2020, Dorset & Wiltshire Fire and Rescue Service responded to a large fire reported at the hotel. Over 100 firefighters responded and surrounding roads were closed off. Crews came from Christchurch, Poole, Ferndown, Hamworthy, Wimborne and Verwood to assist the response. People staying at neighbouring hotels were evacuated. In 2022, investigators said they believe the fire was set deliberately. The building was largely destroyed. In the years since then the remaining structure has crumbled.

== See also ==
- List of hotels in the United Kingdom
