= The Dunstane =

Hotel in Edinburgh, Scotland

The Roseate Edinburgh
- The Dunstane exterior
- Interactive map of the The Roseate Edinburgh area

General information
- Location: The Roseate, 4 West Coates, Edinburgh, Scotland, EH12 5JQ
- Coordinates: 55.945721°N 3.228307°W
- Opening: 1969
- Owner: Bird Group

Design and construction
- Architect: William Henry Playfair

Other information
- Number of rooms: 35
- Number of restaurants: 1
- Parking: Limited private car parking

Website
- Formerly known as The Dunstane Hotel

The Roseate Edinburgh is a boutique hotel located in the west of Edinburgh on West Coates. The hotel, earlier known as the Dunstane Houses.

== History ==
=== Dunstane Villa ===
The building was originally designed by Edinburgh architect Alexander Black and was built as a private home on what was then the edge of the city, in 1852. The Dunstane was home to the distiller Ross family, who gave their name to the Ross Bandstand in Princes Street Gardens.

The building was also used as a training school by Royal Bank of Scotland. It is protected as a category B listed building.

The Dunstane began operating as a hotel in 1969. It was bought by current owners, Derek and Shirley Mowat, in 1998.

=== Hampton House at Dunstane Houses ===
Around 1867, an Edinburgh music seller, Archibald Shearer, then living in the Dunstane, was granted permission to "erect a house or villa agreeable to the plan approved of by the Feoffers of Trust and Governors of George Heriot's Hospital". The link between the properties was restored when it was bought by the Mowats in 2007. The building was opened in 2008 as the 18-bedroom Dunstane City Hotel, by former Scotland rugby union international Scott Hastings.
