= Durdans, Mundesley =

Building in North Norfolk, England

The Durdans
- Norfolk

General information
- Location: Mundesley, North Norfolk, England, 36 Trunch Road; Mundesley; Norfolk; NR11 8JX
- Coordinates: 52°52′20.99″N 1°25′25.13″E
- Owner: Mr & Mrs A & C Griffin

Other information
- Number of rooms: 7 en-suite bedrooms

The Durdans Bed and Breakfast Hotel is located in the English seaside village of Mundesley in the county of Norfolk, United Kingdom. The guest house is a 4-star bed and breakfast with a Silver Award from VisitBritain.

== Location ==
The guest house was built in the Edwardian period and is set in grounds of over two acres. It is on the Trunch road on the south west outskirts of the village of Mundesley. it is approximately 20 minutes walk from the main beach in Mundesley. The nearest railway station is at Gunton for the Bittern Line which runs between Sheringham, Cromer and Norwich, and is 4.0 miles (6.4 km) to the west. The guest house is 8.3 miles (13.4 km) south east of Cromer and 21.2 miles (34.1 km) north east of Norwich. The nearest airport is also at Norwich and that is 21.7 miles (34.9 km) north east of the guest house.
