= The Chase, Ross-on-Wye =

Historic house in Herefordshire, England

Coordinates: 51°54′44.9″N 2°34′46.5″W

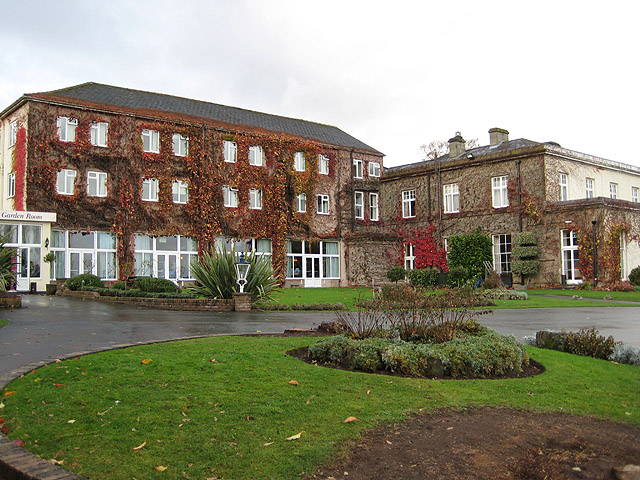
The Chase Hotel, Ross-on-Wye, in 2008

The Chase in Ross-on-Wye, Herefordshire, is a house of historical significance. It was built in 1818 by an attorney, and was a private residence of several notable people until it was sold in 1927. After that time it was converted to a hotel, and was used for this purpose until September 2019.

As a hotel, it had accommodation and restaurant facilities and catered for special events, particularly weddings. In January 2019, the owners held a pre-planning consultation for a proposal in which the original house would be restored and converted into flats and the grounds developed for housing.

The proposal was controversial, and resulted in significant changes to the Ross on Wye Neighbourhood Plan, then being drawn up by Ross Town Council. A local campaign group, Save the Chase 2020, is opposed to any building on the green space, and would prefer the hotel to remain as a hotel and community leisure facility, if a suitable buyer can be found.

== John and Sarah Cooke ==
John Cooke built this substantial house in 1818. He called it 'The Chase' and lived at the property until his death in 1867. John was born in 1781 in Ross-on-Wye. In 1802 he married Sarah Hardwick who also had been born here. She was the daughter of John and Jane Hardwick.

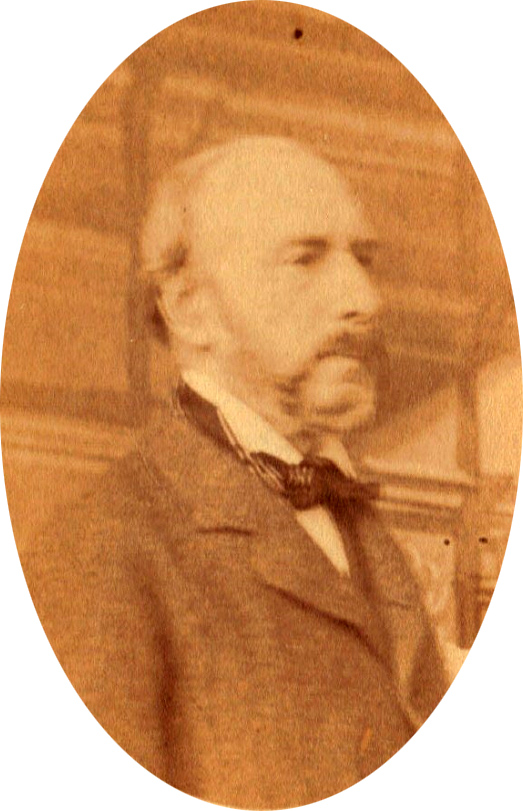
Dr George Strong, circa 1860

In 1805 John became an Articled Clerk to Thomas Harvey of Ross who was a lawyer. After this he became an Attorney. The couple had a son in 1807 who they called John but unfortunately he died in 1820. Their daughter Charlotte was born in 1812 and she was their only surviving child. In 1844 Sarah died and John continued to live in the house with his daughter Charlotte and her husband Dr George Strong until his death in 1867 at the age of 86.

== George and Charlotte Strong ==
In 1839, George Strong married Charlotte Cooke, and the couple lived with Charlotte's father, John Cooke, at the Chase until the 1870s. George was born in 1812 in Brampton Abbotts. His father was the Reverend Robert Strong who was the rector of this town for many years. In 1835 he obtained his medical degree from the University of Edinburgh. After marrying Charlotte, George practiced as a physician in Ross and also became a magistrate. George was an historian and wrote The Heraldry of Herefordshire in 1848, and The Handbook to Ross and Archenfield published in 1863.

George and Charlotte had four daughters two of whom died in childhood and are buried in Ross Churchyard. The surviving two, Beatrice and Joan, remained unmarried and lived with their parents throughout their lives. Around 1876, the family relocated from The Chase to another house in Ross called Ashfield. Charlotte died there in 1892 and was buried in the local churchyard. In 1902, George moved to Bath, where he lived until his death in 1904 at the age of 93.

== General Sir James Fitzmayer and Lady Lucy Fitzmayer ==
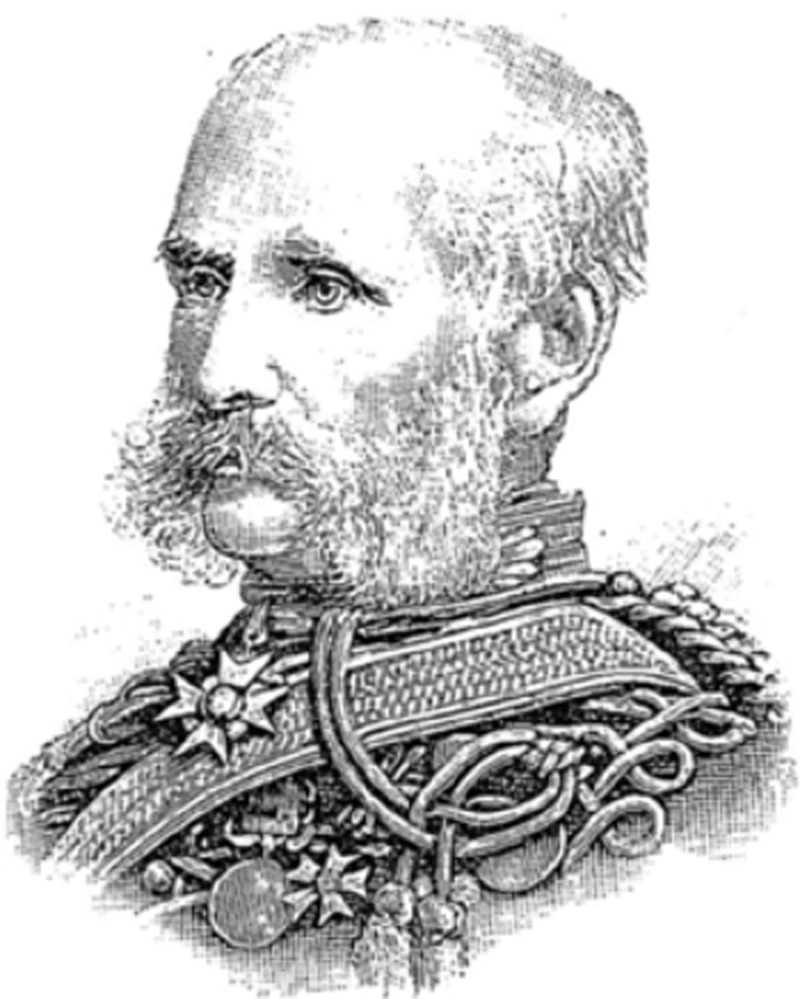
General Sir James Fitzmayer

General Sir James Fitzmayer and his wife Lucy lived at the Chase from about 1880 until his death in 1895. James Fitzmayer was born in 1813 at Demerara in South America. His father was Major Charles Howard Fitzmayer who died when he was only eight years old. He was sent to the Woolwich Military Academy and entered the army when he was seventeen. He served in many fields of war and was present at the Battle of Alma in the Crimea. He received the Legion of Honour and several other awards. In 1871 he was knighted.

He was married twice. His first wife was Jane Louisa Lane whom he married in 1841 but she died in 1859. In 1863 he married Lucy Sivewright who was twenty one years his junior. He had no children. He died at the Chase in 1895 and was buried in St Mary's churchyard in Ross. A detailed description of the life of Sir General James William Fitzmayer and the awards that he received has been written by Brett Payne.

== Colonel Oswald Robert Middleton and Maria Christine Middleton ==
Colonel Oswald Robert Middleton bought the Chase in 1897 after he retired from the army, and lived there until his death in 1927.

Middleton was born in 1840 in Paddington, London. His father was Charles John Middleton, who was the Registrar of the Probate Court in London. He was educated at the Royal Military College, Sandhurst and graduated in 1857. He joined the King's Own Royal Regiment, and remained there for many years. Some of his personal belongings, including his mess uniform, were donated by relatives to the King's Own Royal Regiment Museum, Lancaster in 1949. He fought in the Zulu War and was awarded a medal.

In 1881, at the age of 41, he married Maria Christine Kerr, who was the daughter of Admiral Robert Kerr of Cheltenham. The couple had no children. After he retired to the Chase, Oswald immersed himself in local affairs, and was a very prominent member of the community.
