= Manor House Resort Hotel =

Hotel in Ireland

Coordinates: 54.431°N 7.684°W

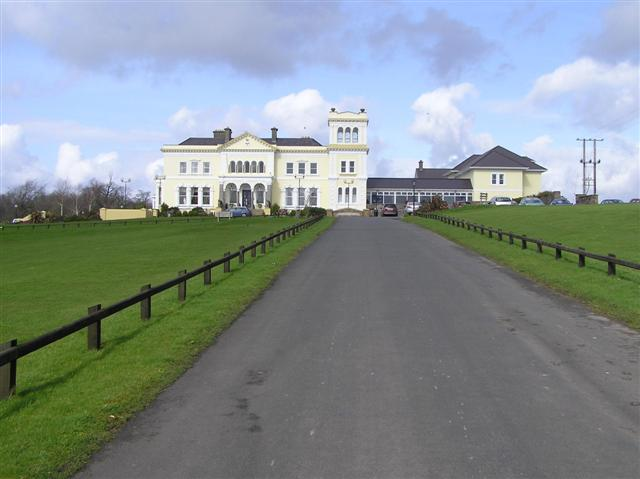
The hotel was formerly Killadeas Manor House

The Manor House Resort Hotel, also known as the Manor House Country Hotel, is a hotel near Lough Erne in County Fermanagh, Northern Ireland. It occupies a former manor house which dates to the 19th century. A four star hotel, its facilities include a swimming pool, gymnasium, restaurants and conference centre.

== History ==
Captain John Irvine, whose brother was Colonel Christopher Irvine of Castle Irvine, acquired the Killadeas estate in 1660. The house was then known as Rockfield. The name was changed to Killadeas Manor House by Major John Irvine, who acquired Killadeas in 1835 and died in 1860. During World War II, the building was requisitioned by the government and used as an officers' mess and headquarters for the nearby Killadeas seaplane base. The house, described by Mark Bence-Jones as being of "Victorian Italianate" design, was sold in 1957 for conversion to a hotel. Subject to renovation in 2002, as of 2016, the hotel was owned by members of the McKenna family.
