= Overwater Hall =

Country house in Ireby, Cumbria, England

Coordinates: 54.70071°N 3.17618°W

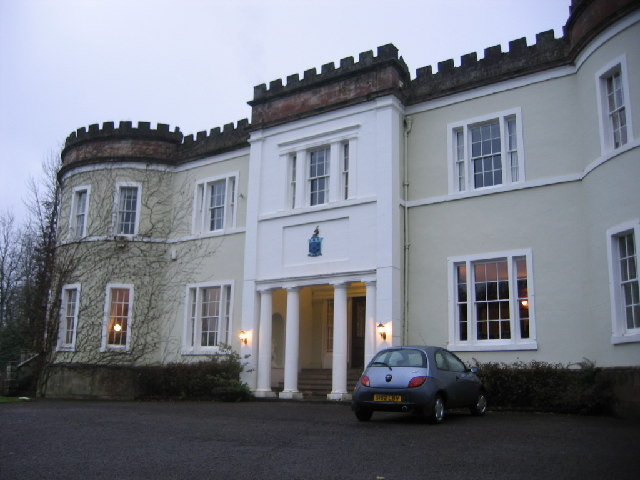
Overwater Hall

Overwater Hall is a country house near Ireby in Cumbria. It is a Grade II Listed building.

== History ==
The house was built for Joseph Gillbanks, who had made his money in the Jamaica, in 1840 and was originally known as Whitefield House. He incorporated an older 18th Century building which seems to have been built by John Gaff in about 1785. The house was sold by the Gillbanks family in 1929 to Frederick Gatty, a textile merchant. After Gatty's death in 1951, it was bought by Charles de Courcy-Parry, who had achieved notoriety when he shot Percy Toplis, a convicted criminal, in 1920 and who went on to become a journalist who wrote under the name of Dalesman. The house was acquired by a Mr & Mrs Henry Hays in 1957, and then became a hotel owned by Mr Monte Green in 1967: it has changed hands several times since then but remains a hotel.

== The Gaff family ==
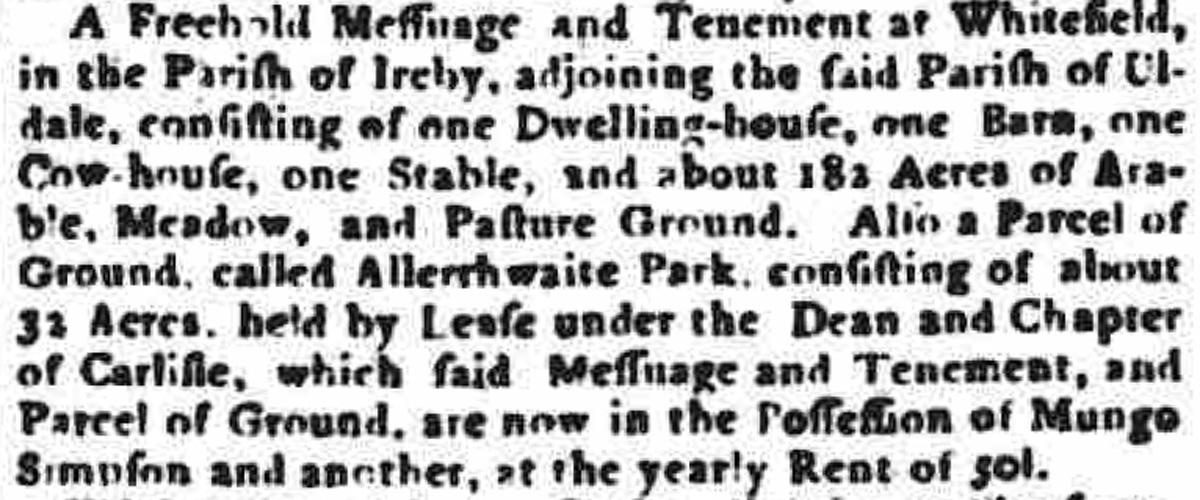
Advertisement of 1781

It appears that John Gaff (1746-1794) acquired Whitefield in about 1781 when it was advertised for sale. The advertisement implies that there was a fairly modest dwelling there at this time which was owned by Mungo Simpson. A newspaper notice shows that John was living at Whitefield by 1788. He died in 1794 and shortly after his son Thomas advertised the property but it appears that he did not sell it. By now the house seems to be very substantial as the notice of 1797 describes it as follows.

"The buildings consist of a well-built brick mansion house with six cellars, all arched, a front and back kitchen, a brew house, two parlours, a drawing room, ten lodging rooms, two large barns, three stables with lofts, four byers, cart lodge with granary above, coach house and every other office complete and fit for the reception of a genteel family."

Thomas Gaff owned Whitefield until 1814 when he advertised it for sale. The sale notice describes the whole estate. It was bought by Joseph Gillbanks.

== The Gillbanks family ==
Joseph Gillbanks (1780-1853) appears to have used the existing mansion as the core of his new house in 1840. He was the son of Joseph Gillbanks (1737-1806) of Scawthwaite Close Farm near Ireby. In 1800 he went to Jamaica and over the next fourteen years he amassed a large fortune as a merchant. In 1814 he returned to England and bought Whitefield and several other large properties in the area. In 1819 he married Mary Jackson who was the daughter of Ralph Jackson of Normanby Hall in Cleveland. She was also the niece of R. Jackson, the Chief Justice of Jamaica.

The couple had three children Jackson who did not marry, Mary Elizabeth who married a doctor, Richard Lawrence and Maria Josephine who married Rev. Henry Gough. Joseph became the Deputy Lieutenant for Cumberland and for almost forty years was a magistrate. Joseph died in 1853 and his son Jackson inherited Whitefield. He did not marry and he lived with his mother Mary Jackson in the house until his death in 1878. Mary died in the same year and the house was left to Jackson’s sister Maria Josephine Gough.

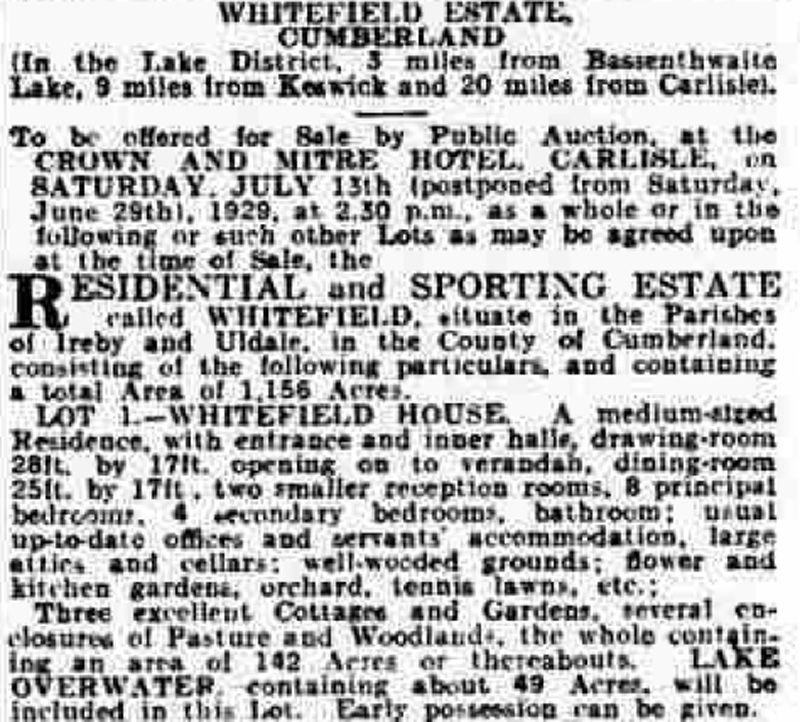
Sale notice of 1929

When Maria Josephine Gough inherited the Hall in 1878 she had been a widow for sixteen years. At his time she was living in Abingdon in Berkshire with her only child Josephine Mary Agnes Gough (1860-1912). She and her daughter continued to live in Abingdon and they rented Whitefield Hall to several tenants. Maria Josephine died in 1888 and her daughter inherited the property. Josephine Mary Agnes did not immediately move to the Hall but the Census data of 1901 shows that she and her friend Mary Edith Macray were living there by this date. Josephine died in 1912 and left the house to her friend Mary as she had no other close relatives. In 1922 Mary Macray sold some of the outlying portions of the estate. In the following year she married Reverend Donald Jones who was the Principal of Bede College Durham. They both lived at Whitefield but in 1925 he died at the age of 67 and four years later she died. The house was put it on the market for sale.
