= The Mayhill Hotel =

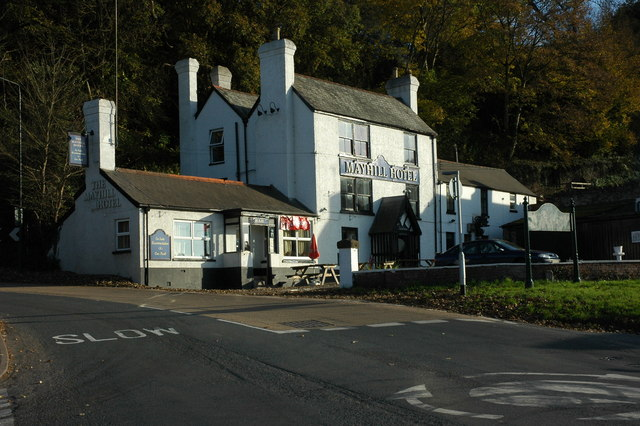
- Interactive map of the The Mayhill Hotel area
- Former names: The Mayhill Pub
- Alternative names: The May Hill Hotel

General information
- Type: Public House
- Location: May Hill, Nr Wyesham, Monmouth, Wales
- Coordinates: 51.809949°N 2.705244°W
- Landlord: Stuart Jones

Website
- themayhillhotel.com

The Mayhill Hotel is a public house and hotel located Wyesham Road, Monmouth, Wales. The pub is situated between the roads leading to Wyesham and the Forest of Dean and as such claims it is the Last Pub in Wales.

== History ==
The building did not open as a public house and hotel until the 20th century. In the 18th century it accommodated lodgers. Founded in 1830 the building became a school called the May Hill Academy for a short period in the 1820s it was run by the Davies family. Frank Shelly was the first proprietor of the Public House and Hotel and advertised the hotel in 1924 as Family and Commercial, board residence, luncheons, dinners and teas. Electric light throughout. In the 1930s Mrs E Braint was the manageress when the pub was serving Ind Coope and Allsopp Burton Ales.
