= Hilton Grand Vacations Club Craigendarroch Suites Royal Deeside =

Resort in Ballater, Scotland

Coordinates: 57°3′27″N 3°3′16″W

Hilton Grand Vacations Club Craigendarroch Suites Royal Deeside in Ballater, Scotland, is a resort complex close to the banks of the River Dee. It is located on a hillside just west of the village of Ballater, 42 miles west of Aberdeen and is 17 miles to the east of Braemar. It is also close to Balmoral, the Scottish home of the Royal Family. The hotel takes its name from the Craigendarroch Hill which is close by. The resort's position affords great views over Royal Deeside.

The resort sits just off the A93 road, the main route between Aberdeen and Braemar, and can also be reached by public transport, with the Stagecoach Bluebird service 201 passing by the resort entrance.

The resort was developed in the mid-1980s by Cannon Street Developments and was later sold to Stakis Hotels, who rather controversially changed the name of the resort to Stakis Royal Deeside, before reverting to its former name. When the Stakis chain was purchased by the Hilton Group in the late 1990s, Craigendarroch became the Hilton Craigendarroch. The resort itself consists of a medium-sized hotel and leisure club, with 99 self-catering lodges nearby. Hilton Grand Vacations operate the timeshare scheme which manages the lodges.

The hotel was refurbished in early 2007. The hotel closed on 6 January 2013 and has since been reworked into 32 one- and two-bedroom timeshare suites, operating under the name Hilton Grand Vacations Club Craigendarroch Suites Royal Deeside.

== See also ==
- Ballater, Scotland
