= Fownes Hotel =

Hotel in Worcester, England

Coordinates: 52.18939°N 2.21728°W

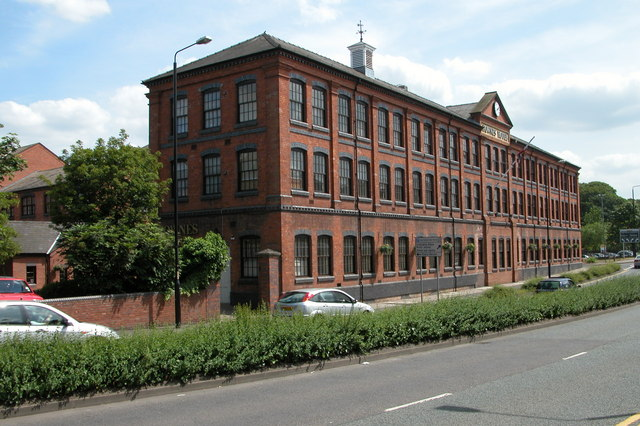
Fownes Hotel

Fownes Hotel and Restaurant is a hotel in Worcester, England, along the canalside. It is situated in an old Victorian glove factory. It has 63 rooms. The three-storey red brick building, with twenty-five bays, dates to 1882–4, when it was built by Yeates & Jones, 1882–4. It was later extended. It is described as having a "classic English restaurant, where meals are served on Royal Worcester porcelain".
