= The Traveller's Rest, Grasmere =

Hotel in Cumbria, England

The Traveller's Rest
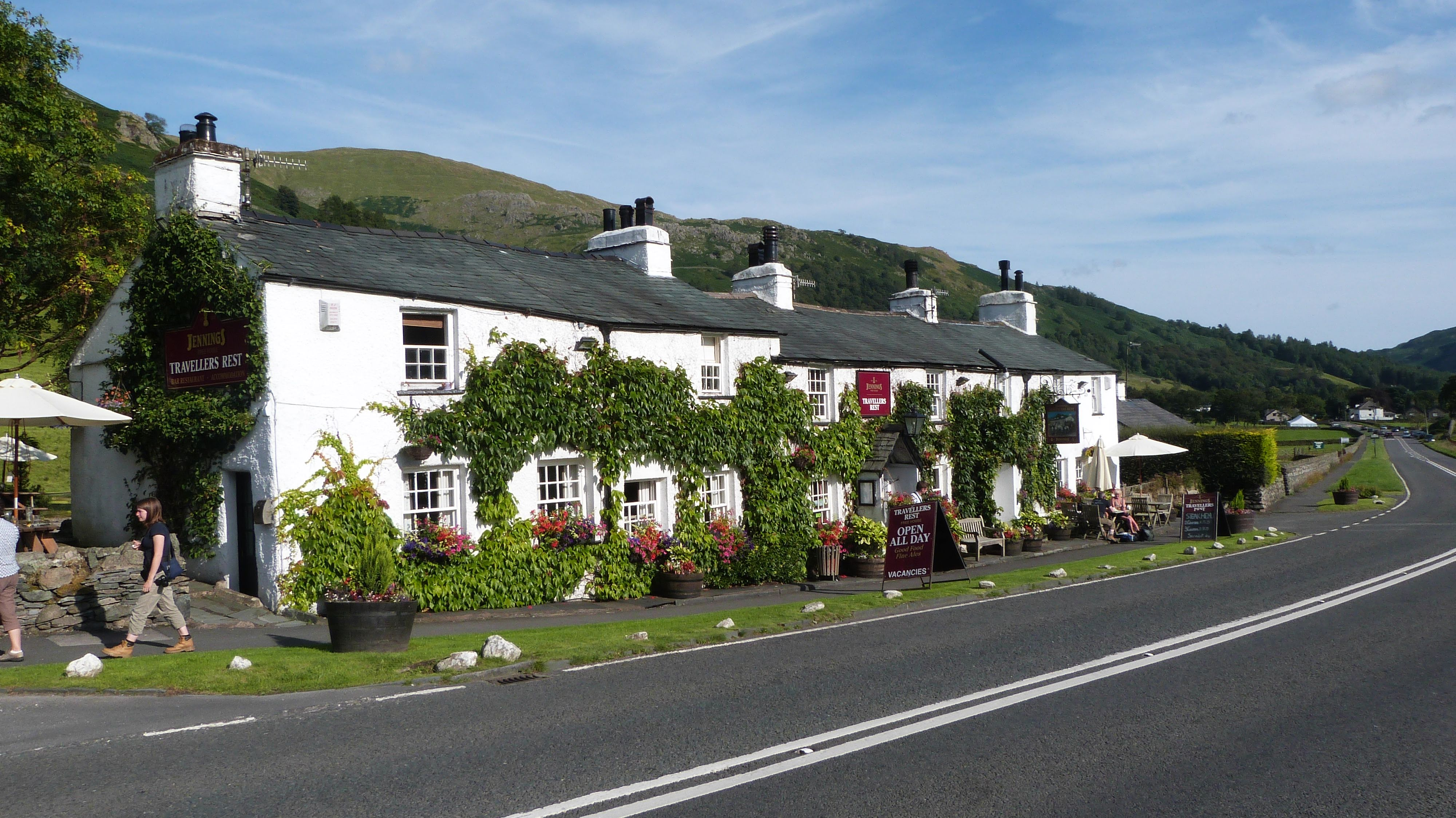
- The building in 2014
- Interactive map of the The Traveller's Rest area

General information
- Type: Hotel and public house
- Location: A591, Grasmere, Cumbria, England
- Coordinates: 54°28′17″N 3°01′32″W

Website
- www.lakedistrictinns.co.uk/travellers-rest

The Traveller's Rest is a hotel and public house in Grasmere, Cumbria, England. Located on the eastern side of the A591, it is a Grade II listed building dating to the 16th century.

An old coaching inn at the foot of Dunmail Raise, the building is two storeys, roughcast over stone rubble with a slate roof. It is in two blocks, stepped down the hillside. The upper block has four 16-paned sash windows on the ground floor and two 12-paned sashes above. The lower block has two doors with modern porches, six sashes on the ground floor and five above, mostly 16-paned.

The pub has one of the highest elevations in England, at 1,475 feet (450 m), about 250 feet (76 m) lower than Tan Hill Inn in North Yorkshire.

As of 2010, the pub was owned by the Jennings Brewery.

== Gallery ==
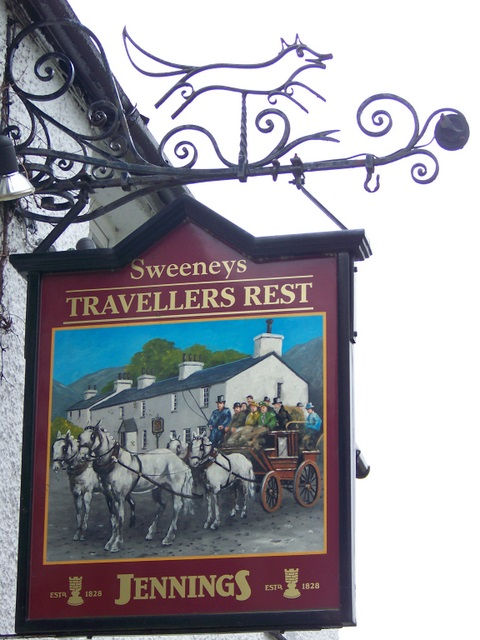
The pub's sign in 2010
