= The Riverside Hotel, Monmouth =

Public house and hotel in Monmouth, Wales

The Riverside Hotel
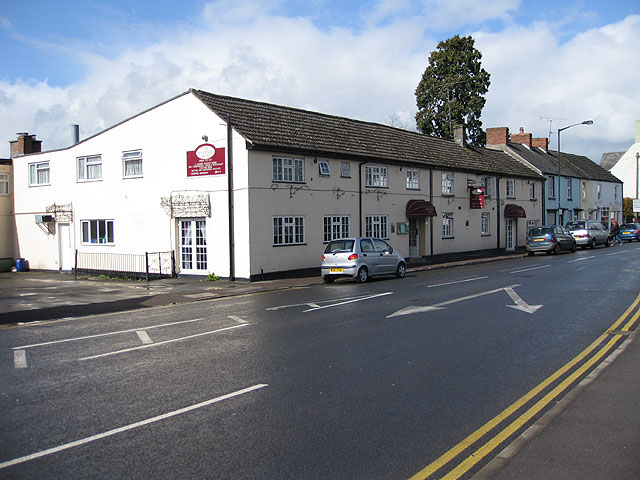
- Interactive map of the The Riverside Hotel area
- Former names: The Rising Sun Hotel, The Rising Sun Motel.
- Alternative names: The Riverside

General information
- Type: Public House & Hotel
- Location: Cinderhill Street, Monmouth, Wales
- Coordinates: 51.807864°N 2.720066°W

Website
- www.riversidehotelmonmouth.co.uk

The Riverside Hotel is a public house and hotel located in Cinderhill Street, Monmouth, Wales. The hotel has a bar and a function room and has 17 bedrooms.

== History ==
The hotel was originally known as The Rising Sun from at least 1822 until the late 1980s when the name was changed. An inn called The Sun was recorded in 1717 in the same area but it is not clear if the establishment is the same. In 1972 the Rising Sun was opened as a motel. During the 1970s the motel was frequented by members of the British rock band Motörhead during the recording of their first album at nearby Rockfield Studios, reputedly because it was virtually the only establishment in the town with a pool table.
