= Rothay Manor =

Country house in Cumbria, England

Rothay Manor Hotel
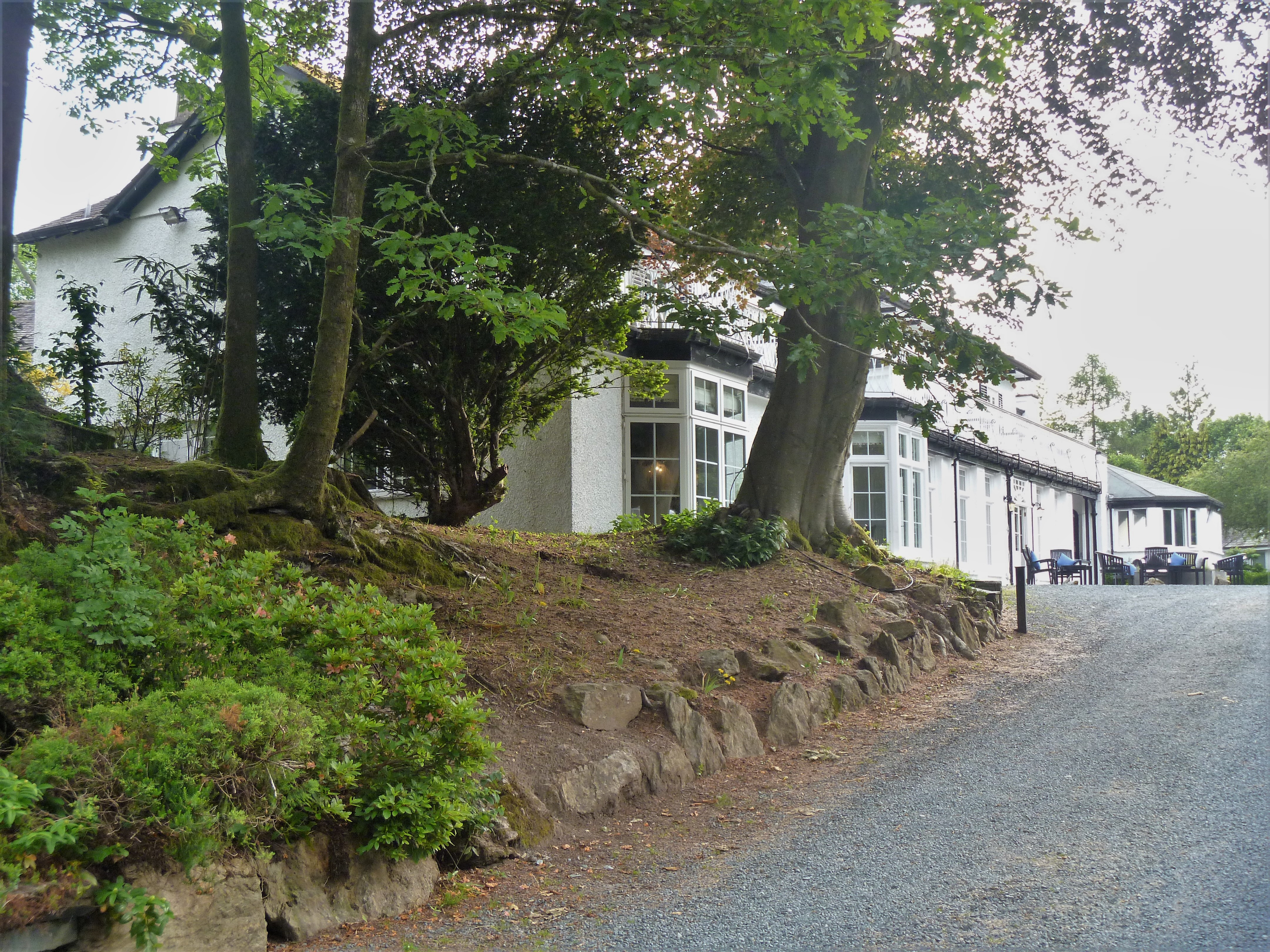
- The building in June 2019
- Interactive map of the Rothay Manor Hotel area

General information
- Type: Hotel
- Architectural style: Regency Country House
- Location: Ambleside, Cumbria, United Kingdom
- Coordinates: 54.426562°N 2.9678368°W
- Opening: 2016
- Owner: Jenna Shail & Jamie Shail

Design and construction
- Architect: Ben Cunliffe Architects

Other information
- Number of rooms: 23
- Number of restaurants: 1 (Rowan)
- Parking: Free parking

Website
- www.rothaymanor.co.uk

Rothay Manor is a country house near Ambleside in Cumbria. It is a Grade II listed building.

== History ==
The house was built for John Crosfield, a merchant from Liverpool, in 1835 and was originally known as Rothay Bank. The veranda and balcony, which is made of cast iron, was conceived by Mrs Crosfield, who was French. The house came into the ownership of Sir George Mills McKay, treasurer of the English-Speaking Union and a Sheriff of London, in the early 20th century.

The building became a hotel under the name Rothay Manor in 1936. It was acquired by a catering lecturer, Bronwen Nixon, in 1966 and subsequently passed to her sons, Nigel and Stephen.

In 2016, Jamie and Jenna Shail bought the property. The couple previously owned and operated ski chalets in France before returning to the UK.

The hotel was renovated with the design work led by Matt Hulme from Dynargh Design company. There are now 23 individually designed rooms and together with a series of suites that are located in a separate wing from the manor house and were designed by Ben Cunliffe Architects in 2022.

== Restaurant ==
Rowan is headed by Michelin-starred chef, Simon Ulph, who joined in May 2026.

== Awards & Recognition ==
In July 2022, Rothay Manor Hotel joined Small Luxury Hotels of the World (SLH).

In September 2022, the hotel secured AA Inspectors’ Choice 4 Red Star Award at AA Hospitality Awards 2022.

The hotel restaurant won the Best Dining Experience Award at the Condé Nast Johansens Awards for Excellence 2022.

In 2023, the hotel was awarded the Small Hotel of the Year at Cumbria Tourism Awards.

Rowan is a Michelin Guide recommended restaurant.

== Sources ==
- Martineau, Harriet Harriet (1983). Martineau's Letters to Fanny Wedgwood. Stanford University Press. p. 146. ISBN 978-0804711463. "Rothay Bank Liverpool."

Official website
