= Oban Hydro =

Unfinished hotel in Oban, Scotland

Coordinates: 56.41218°N 5.46763°W

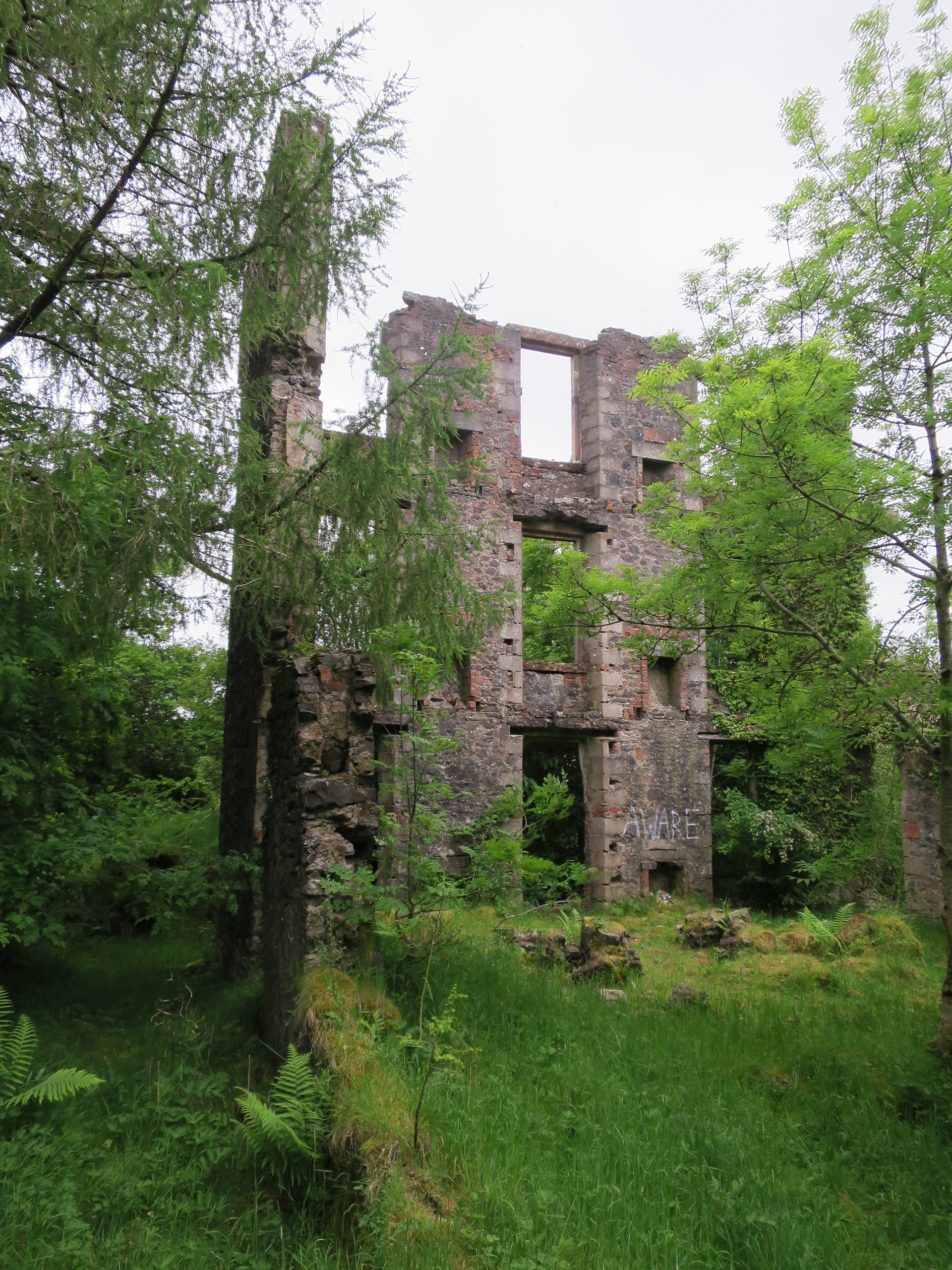
Oban Hydro ruins, 2015

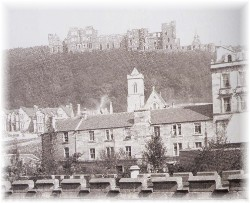
The Hydro pictured from Oban in 1897

The Oban Hills Hydropathic Sanatorium was a proposed hydropathic hotel in Oban, Scotland. Construction of the hotel began in 1881 on a hill east of the downtown overlooking the town and the harbour. Had it been completed the hotel would have been a major landmark on the Oban skyline. The hotel was never completed due to financial difficulties and currently lies in ruins.

== History ==
Hydropathy, the use of water for treating diseases and soothing pains, was very popular amongst the wealthy in 19th century Britain, with several Hydropathic Hotels being built around Scotland. With the newly arrived railway making Oban accessible to Glasgow and Edinburgh a group of Glasgow businessmen formed the Oban Hills Hydropathic Sanatorium Limited in 1881. The proposed hotel was to have contained 137 bedrooms, a conservatory, a concert hall and seawater baths. There were also plans for a golf course, stables, landscaped gardens and a hydraulic lift to bring guests up from the town.

Robert MacAlpine and Co. was contracted for the construction and 300 workers were employed in building the hotel. A miniature railway was built to carry construction materials up the hill. By 1882 the roof timbers were in place and the hotel was distinctly visible from the town below.

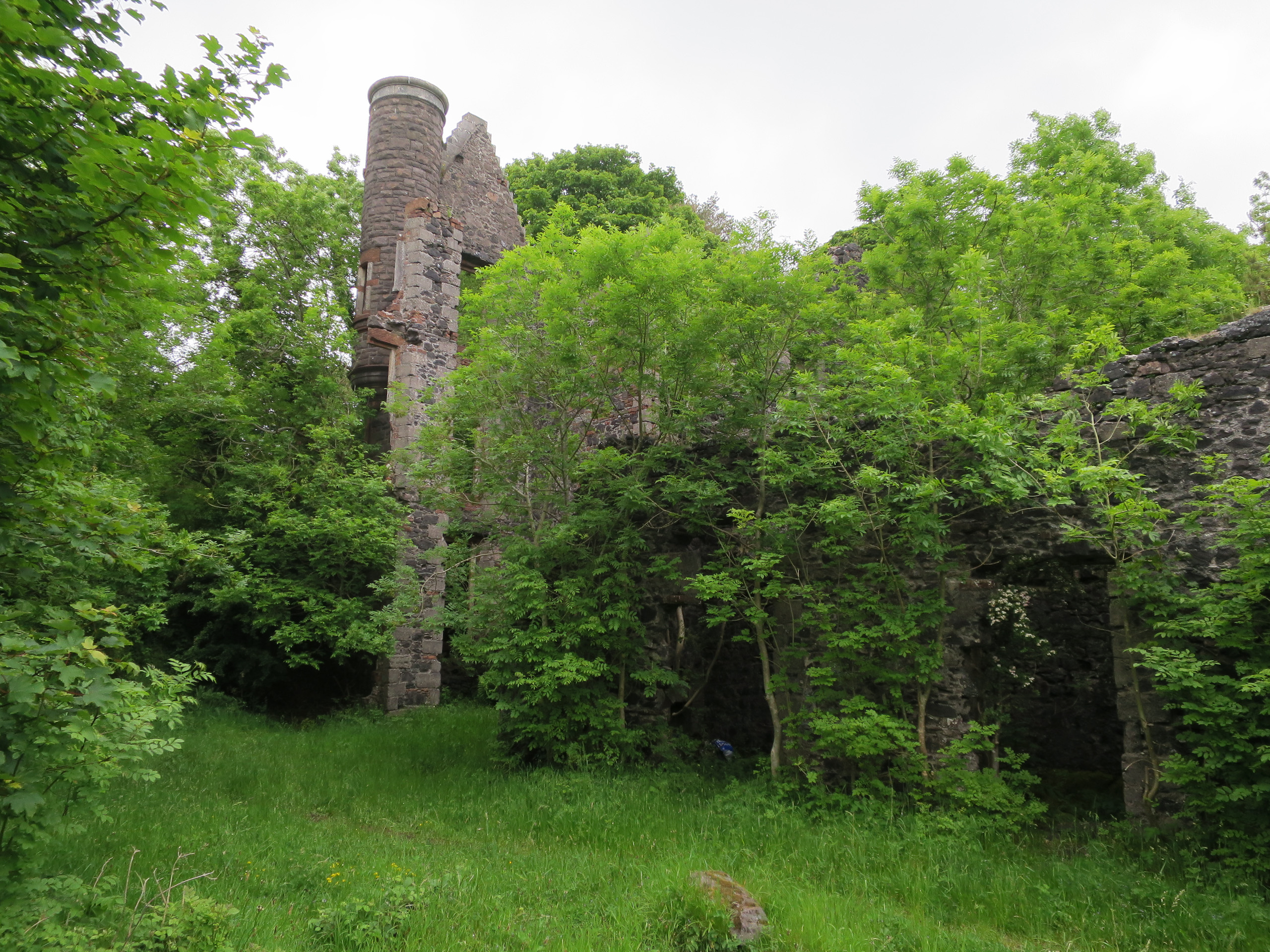
Oban Hydro ruins, 2015

However, the project soon fell into financial difficulty, the cost of the hotel having been grossly underestimated. Shareholders were unwilling to continue financing the construction and the nearly-completed hotel was abandoned. The structure slowly fell into ruin as local residents pillaged stones to build their own homes. The Old Hydro is now barely visible from the town below.
