= Maids Head Hotel =

4 Star hotel in Norwich, England

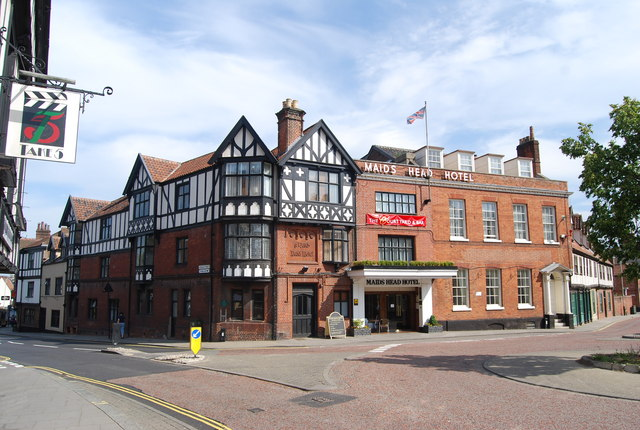

- Norfolk

General information
- Location: Tombland, Norwich, Norfolk, England
- Coordinates: 52°37′55″N 1°17′56″E
- Opening: circa 13th century

Other information
- Number of rooms: 84
- Number of restaurants: 1 The WinePress @ Wensum
- Parking: 83 spaces

Listed Building – Grade II
- Designated: 26 February 1954
- Reference no.: 1051811

The Maids Head Hotel is an AA 4 star hotel in the English city of Norwich within the county of Norfolk in the United Kingdom. The hotel has been a Grade II* listed building since 26 February 1954.

== Location ==
The hotel is in the city centre area of Norwich known as Tombland and is very close to Norwich Cathedral. Norwich railway station is 0.7 miles (1.1 km) south east of the hotel. The nearest airport is Norwich Airport and is 3.5 miles (5.6 km) north of the hotel

== Description ==
The hotel dates from the 13th century and is amalgamation of at least 6 buildings. The main façade faces on to intersection of three streets, Tombland, Wensum Street and Palace Street. The hotel has a total of 84 bedrooms all of which are en-suite. The hotel also has a mixture of meeting and conference room facilities. There is also a restaurant which is called The WinePress @ Wensum. The hotel has two bar areas. The Maids Head Bar features Jacobean Oak panelling and has been reputedly frequented by guests such as Horatio Nelson and Edith Cavell. There is also a second bar which is called the Yard Bar.

== History ==
Queen Elizabeth I of England was said to have slept at the hotel in 1587.
