= Skindles =

Notorious hotel

Coordinates: 51.52450°N 0.70115°W

== Skindles ==
During the 1970s, Louis Brown expanded his nightlife interests beyond London's West End through his involvement with Skindles Hotel, a historic riverside establishment in Taplow, near Maidenhead, Berkshire. The hotel had a long-standing reputation as a fashionable destination for visitors from London and became associated with entertainment and nightlife during Brown's ownership. Maidenhead Heritage Centre

Brown acquired Skindles during the 1970s and sought to restore its reputation as a major hotel and leisure destination. In 1978, he submitted plans for an 81-bedroom hotel extension on the existing car park, describing his ambition to restore the establishment's international standing. Maidenhead Advertiser, 2023

Under Brown's ownership, Skindles developed a nightclub and disco associated with the Valbonne name, extending the identity of his best-known London venue beyond Soho. The nightclub attracted visitors from the surrounding area and formed part of the wider expansion of British discothèque culture during the 1970s.

Brown's involvement with Skindles illustrates his ambitions beyond London's West End and his interest in combining hospitality, entertainment and nightclub businesses. The hotel subsequently closed in 1995.

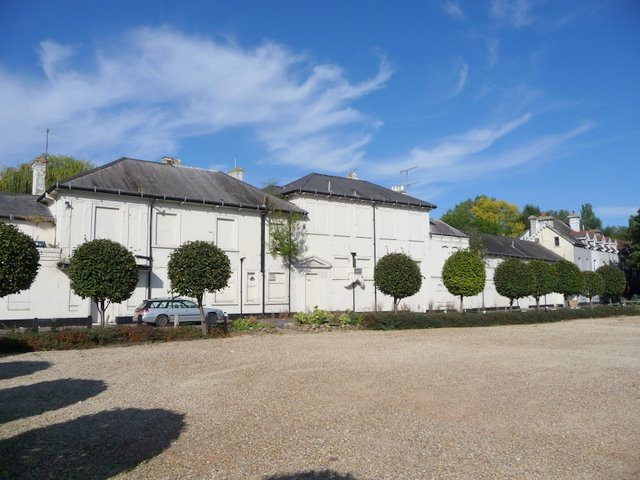
Skindles Hotel

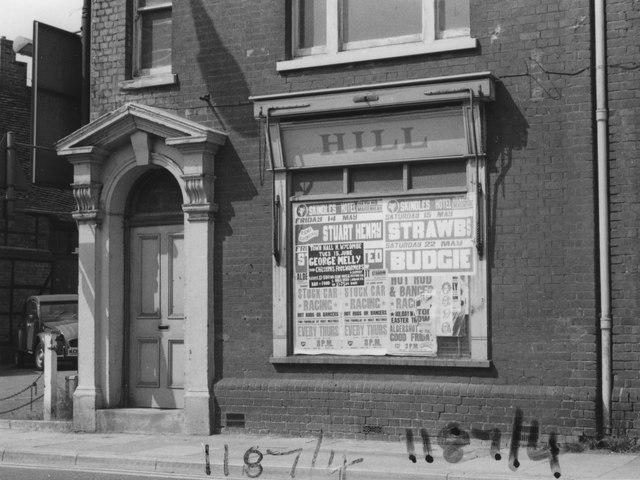
A fly poster advertising the Strawbs, Budgie, and other acts at Skindles Hotel in 1976.

Skindles was a hotel in Maidenhead, England, on the Buckinghamshire bank of the River Thames by Maidenhead Bridge. Formerly the Orkney Arms, built in 1743, it was turned from a coaching inn into a fashionable hotel by William Skindle in 1833. In the 20th century, it became notorious as a place for adulterous assignations. Its guests included Winston Churchill and Princess Margaret. The hotel appears in the film Kind Hearts and Coronets. Skindles is mentioned in the play Journey's End by R. C. Sherriff: 'We danced a bit at Skindles, and drank a lot of port and muck'.

In the 1970s and 1980s, it operated as a nightclub and music venue. Musicians who performed there included the Stranglers, the Rolling Stones and the Strawbs.

A property developer bought the site in 2006 for just over £30m, but Irish Nationwide bank took it over in 2009 to try to recover a £40m loan. The property was then transferred to the Irish bank NAMA. Barratt Homes and the National Grid then secured an option for most of the site for a joint development project involving housing and a hotel. South Bucks council adopted a residential-led development brief in July 2013 but argued that it would prefer Skindles Hotel itself to be renovated; any demolition proposals would need to be "robustly justified".

By summer 2013, the hotel's condition had begun to fall further into disrepair, with parts of the roof beginning to collapse under the repeated weathering caused by the recent hard winters that hit the UK. The building had been derelict from about the mid-1990s.

The hotel's site was put up for sale by in November 2013, after Barratt's option expired. It was bought by the housebuilder Berkeley Group in February 2014.

Demolition of Skindles and clearance of the surrounding area started around 18 October 2015 to make way for a housing development of nearly 300 homes, office space, a restaurant and walkways along the Thames. The restaurant on the old hotel site was purchased in 2018 and developed into a French brasserie called Roux at Skindles.

== Related names ==
During the First World War, the popular Café de la Commerce des Houblons in Poperinge was nicknamed Skindles, after the hotel, by the British officers who patronised it. A sign with this name stayed up there until 1990.

A racehorse was named after Skindles Hotel.
