= Corbyn Head Hotel =

Former hotel in Devon, UK

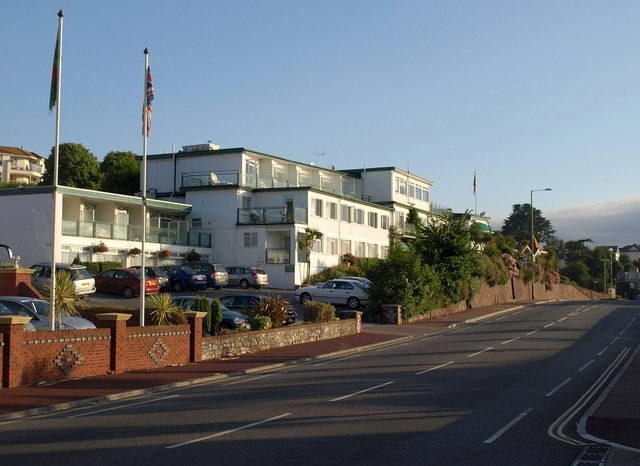

- Location within Devon

General information
- Location: Torbay, Devon, England
- Coordinates: 50°27′18″N 3°32′45″W
- Demolished: 2020

Website
- Official site

Corbyn Head Hotel was a hotel on the seafront of Torbay Road, Torbay, Devon. The hotel had 52 bedrooms in 1990 but was later reduced to 45 bedrooms. It was often used for conferences in Torbay. The hotel was demolished in February 2020 to make way for a controversial six-storey replacement.
