= Abbey Court Hotel =

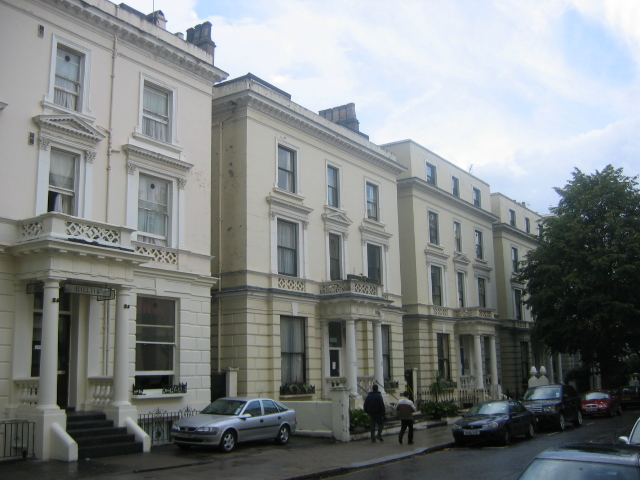
- Pembridge Gardens (2006)

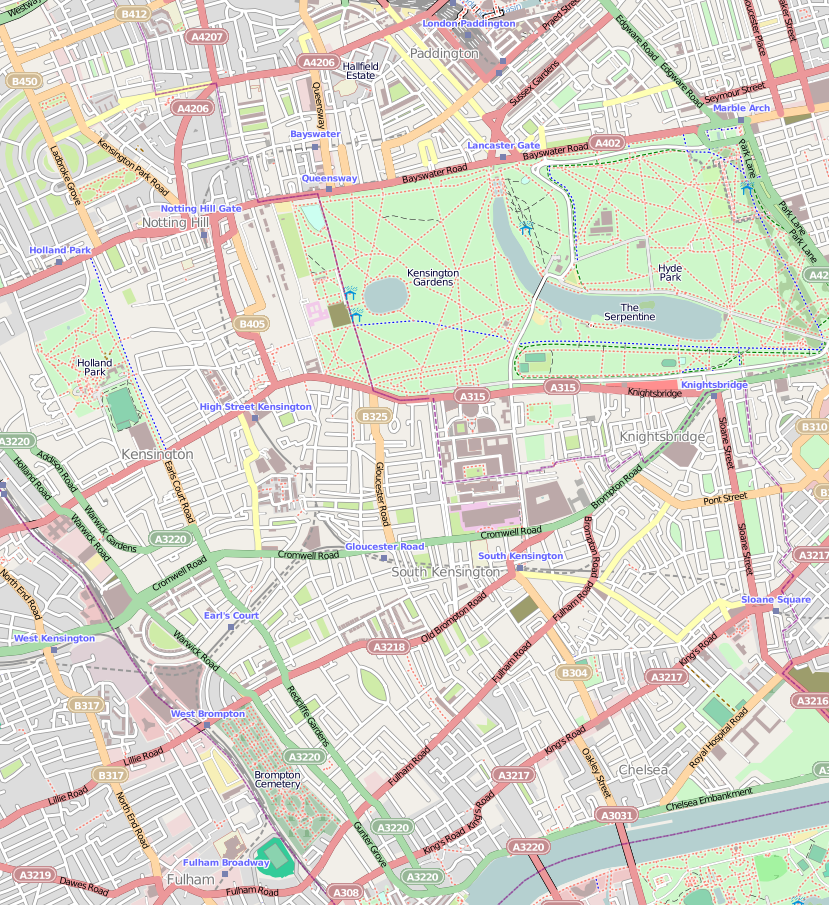
- Location

General information
- Location: 20 Pembridge Gardens, Notting Hill, London
- Coordinates: 51°30′36″N 0°11′48″W
- Opening: 1830; 196 years ago

Other information
- Number of rooms: 22

Website
- abbeycourthotel.co.uk

Abbey Court Hotel is a hotel located at 20 Pembridge Gardens, in Notting Hill, London. Built in 1830, the hotel is housed in a white-stucco Victorian townhouse. The hotel has 22 rooms, with Italian marble bathrooms.
