= Copthorne Hotel, Cardiff =

Hotel in Cardiff, Wales

Copthorne Hotel

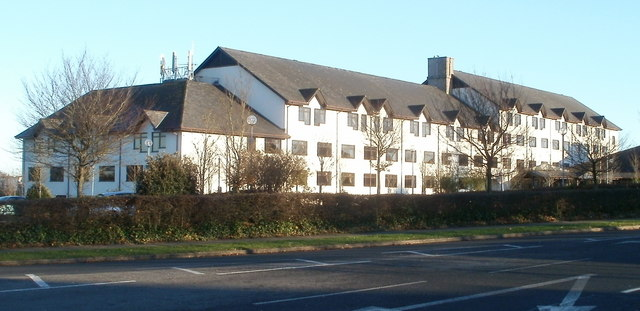

- Location within Cardiff

General information
- Location: Copthorne Way, Culverhouse Cross, Cardiff, Wales, United Kingdom
- Coordinates: 51°27′51″N 3°16′18″W
- Opening: 1993
- Management: Millennium & Copthorne

Other information
- Number of rooms: 135

Copthorne Hotel Cardiff‍—‌Caerdydd is a four star hotel (formerly five star) in Culverhouse Cross, a western suburb of Cardiff, capital of Wales.

The hotel is operated by Millennium & Copthorne. It is located near the Wenvoe transmitting station, off the A4050 road near the Culverhouse Cross roundabout (which intersects with the A48 and the A4232).

The hotel has 135 bedrooms. While it previously featured a leisure club with a swimming pool, steam room, and sauna, these facilities closed permanently prior to the hotel's 2025 public reopening. The property features a private lake at the front which is screened from the road by a landscaped mound.

The hotel was one of the earliest developments to take place at the Culverhouse Cross site as the development boom took off throughout the 1990s. Today the hotel is closely surrounded by retail outlets.

The hotel made the news in the early 2000s after two guests had died from Legionnaires' disease, caused by an incorrectly installed humidifier. The hotel was fined £40,000 on top of £15,000 costs. The hotel made news again in the early 2020s after it was first used by the Home Office to house asylum seekers while their claims for asylum were assessed, then by Cardiff City Council as temporary accommodation for homeless families. Commenting on the decision to house homeless people at the hotel in September 2023, a spokesman for the Council described it as representing "better value for money than using hotels on an ad hoc, reactive basis". On 16 May 2025, the hotel announced it would be reopening to the public from Monday 19 May, and following refurbishment to its rooms, bar and restaurant.
