= Nansloe Manor =

Country house in Cornwall, England

Coordinates: 50.0917°N 5.2738°W

Nansloe Manor, in Helston, Cornwall, England, UK, is a country house and former hotel, originally built in the 16th century. Nansloe is a grade II listed building.

== History ==
=== Toponymy ===
Nansloe — nans, a valley and loe, a lake or pool in the Cornish language.

=== 16th and 17th centuries ===
The earliest record of a dwelling house in the site dates back to the 16th century, in the form of a small, one roomed granite farm cottage positioned where rooms fourteen and fifteen are now. In the early 17th century Nansloe Manor came into being when William Robinson married a daughter of Thomas Penrose from the neighbouring Penrose Estate, and built a manor house. Their son, Thomas was a Colonel in the army of King Charles I and became Mayor of Helston. He was killed by a bull at Nansloe in 1665.

=== 18th century ===
In 1735 the Robinsons carried out extensive alterations to most parts of the building turning it into a residence more suited to a gentleman farmer. A new three storey extension was built on the south-west elevation with large floor to ceiling windows on the ground floor and dormers to the staff accommodation (now housing the Garden Room, bedrooms four, five and six at first floor level and attic space).

A gatehouse was built at the end of the drive. It was a small thatched building with rustic posts and was destroyed by a fire on Good Friday in 1917. Its replacement was built in 1924.

=== 19th century ===
In 1857 there is evidence of an auction of the property in the form of a newspaper cutting from the West Briton but no record of the purchaser.

It is believed that about 1871 having been made unsafe by fire, part of the original house was demolished, the stone being used to hedge the yard of the nearby Home Farm. In 1872 the house was sold to Adolphus William Young, MP for Helston, who made further additions and alterations. Young was not re-elected to Parliament in 1880 and he sold Nansloe to Henry Rogers (died 1887), a solicitor and grandson of the inventor Henry Trengrouse. Rogers restored and re-roofed the building and removed trees to give a view of Loe Pool.

In 1898 the house passed to Henry Rogers, son of Henry Montague Rogers, later knighted and known as 'Sir Montague'. Still further enlargements were made to the house. His extension to the south-east was much grander and to a different scale altogether, considerably larger rooms with greater ceiling heights, as are evidenced in the lounge and bedrooms one, two and three.

=== 20th and 21st centuries ===
Major Tanner Rogers, his son, inherited the Manor in circa 1940. Nansloe was requisitioned during the Second World War and sick Italian and German prisoners of war were billeted here. In 1942 it was bought back into the Penrose Estate by Captain John Lionel Rogers. John Lionel Rogers died on 5 November 1961, without issue; his younger brother gave up his right of succession in favour of his eldest son, Lieutenant Commander J P Rogers.

In 1974 Nansloe Manor was given to the National Trust as part of a package of over 1,500 acres (6.1 km^{2}) of woodland and farmland, Loe Pool, houses, buildings and four miles (6 km) of foreshore. However, as the Manor House at that time was not a listed building, the Trust decided to sell it, along with The Lodge and Nansloe Farm. Since 1975 Nansloe Manor has been in private ownership and was run as a hotel for many years, although it has now reverted to a private dwelling.
