= Dunalastair Hotel =

Scottish hotel

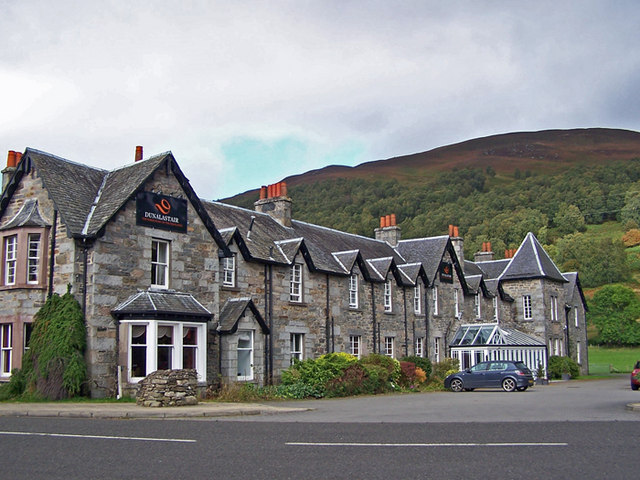
- Interactive map of the Dunalastair Hotel area

General information
- Location: Kinloch Rannoch, Perthshire, Scotland, United Kingdom
- Coordinates: 56°42′2.523″N 4°11′13.173″W
- Opening: 1788

Other information
- Number of rooms: 32
- Number of restaurants: 1
- Parking: Onsite

Website
- dunalastairhotels.com

The Dunalastair Hotel Suites is a grade listed, 5 star hotel located in Kinloch Rannoch, Perthshire. Originally established in 1788, the current building dates from 1862 and has seen numerous owners and refurbishments; it was re-opened in May 2017 following an extensive redesign by the London-based Henley Plc, which subsequently won several awards.

== Location ==
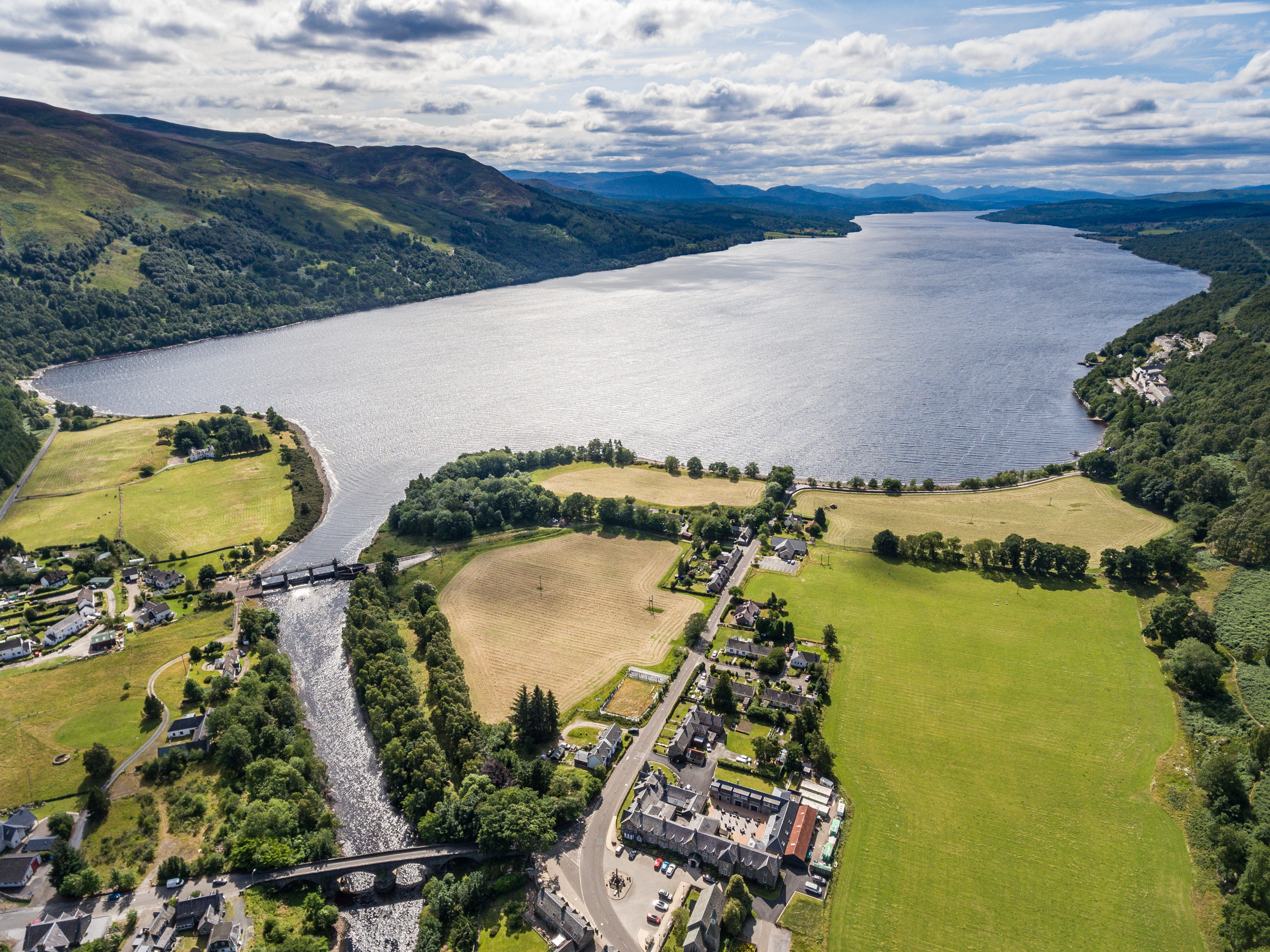
Kinloch Rannoch

The hotel is on the east edge of Loch Rannoch, on the village square in Kinloch Rannoch, within Perth and Kinross, Scotland.

== History ==
=== Alexander Robertson and the Jacobite rising ===
The land on which the hotel is sited was originally owned by the Clan Donnachaidh. In 1745 the clan's then-chief, Alexander Robertson was defeated in battle during the Jacobite rising and all of the clan's land was sold to the crown, and only later restored to Robertson's ancestors in 1782, 33 years after his death.

Looking to resettle in the wake of their defeat at the Battle of Culloden, the few surviving soldiers began to develop a small community, today the village of Kinloch Rannoch.

In 1788 the soldiers built an inn at the entrance of this village. This eventually became the Dunalastair Hotel.

=== General Sir John Macdonald ===
By the 1860s the Dunalastair Estate belonged to General Sir John Macdonald, who began to develop the surrounding areas. This included the building, in 1862, of a mansion known as Dunalastair House, as well as the episcopal church in Kinloch Rannoch Square.

At this time General Macdonald took ownership of the inn which had been built in 1788, and named it the Macdonald Arms Hotel.

=== 20th Century ===
By the end of the Victorian era, the Macdonald Arms Hotel was firmly established in the area, and was bought by new owners in the early 1900s, when it became known simply as Dunalastair Hotel, Loch Rannoch.

=== Closure and Takeover ===
By the turn of the century, the Dunalastair Hotel had already undergone several changes of ownership, and in 2012, was closed altogether. It reopened on 1 May 2017 as Dunalastair Hotel Suites following an extensive redesign by new owners, changing the interior to a modern, contemporary design.

== Awards ==
Dunalastair Hotel Suites has won various awards, including:

- Nominated Scotland's Leading Hotel 2019 – World Travel Awards
- Best Serviced Accommodation 2019 – Prestige Hotel Awards
- Boutique Hotel of the Year 2018 – Scottish Hospitality Awards
- Best UK Country and Coastal Hotel 2018 – Boutique Hotel Awards
- Hotel Suites (Europe) Shortlisted 2018 – International Hotel and Property Awards
