= The Sloop Inn =

Inn in St Ives, Cornwall

Sloop Inn
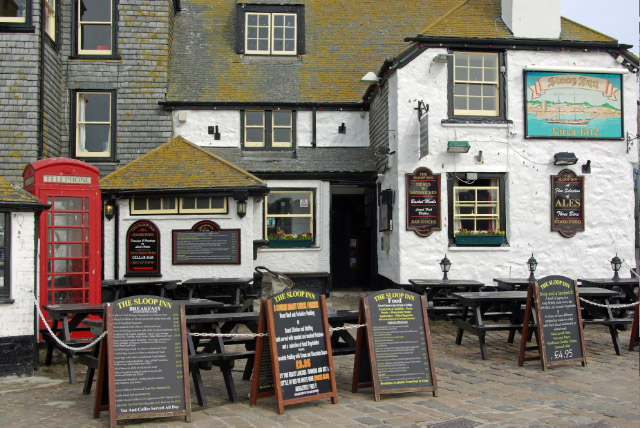

- Location within Southwest Cornwall

General information
- Location: St Ives, Cornwall, England
- Coordinates: 50°12′55″N 5°28′46″W
- Completed: c. 1312

The Sloop Inn is an inn in St Ives, Cornwall, England, located on the wharf. It is one of the oldest inns in Cornwall, the public house is dated to "circa 1312" although the present building was built in the 17th or 18th century. Made of granite rubble, with a slate roof, the Sloop Inn was the favourite haunt of Victorian artists, including Louis Grier, and many of his paintings hung there in earlier years.

Today the public house is a traditional bar, with low ceilings but with an outside decking area. It also includes accommodation for guests.

== History ==
The present building dates from the 17th or 18th century, but the public house is dated to "circa 1312". The inn is one of the oldest surviving in Cornwall, possibly in the United Kingdom, and was popular with artists during the Victorian era, with one commentator stating that the artists and fisherman got on well together. One particular artist who enjoyed the atmosphere was Louis Grier, who had many paintings hung there.

Today, the public house is described in the Lonely Planet guide as "A classic old fishermen's boozer, complete with low ceilings, tankards behind the bar and a comprehensive selection of Cornish ales." It has accommodation for guests, as well as an outside upper deck bar.

== Architecture ==
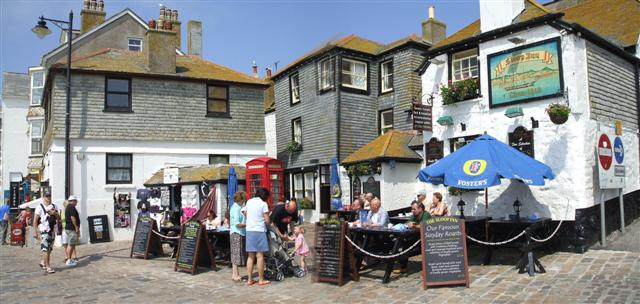
The courtyard of the Sloop Inn

Set on the Wharf at St. Ives, the building is set over two storeys, and built between the 17th and 18th centuries. The roof is made of slate with a flat-headed dormer and a single chimney stack. The building is made of colour-washed granite rubble stone and has a tarred plinth. The inn was designated a Grade II listed building as a group with the nearby cottages in Back Lane, listed on 4 June 1952.
