= The Beaufort Hotel, Chepstow =

Hotel in Chepstow, Monmouthshire, Wales

The Beaufort Hotel
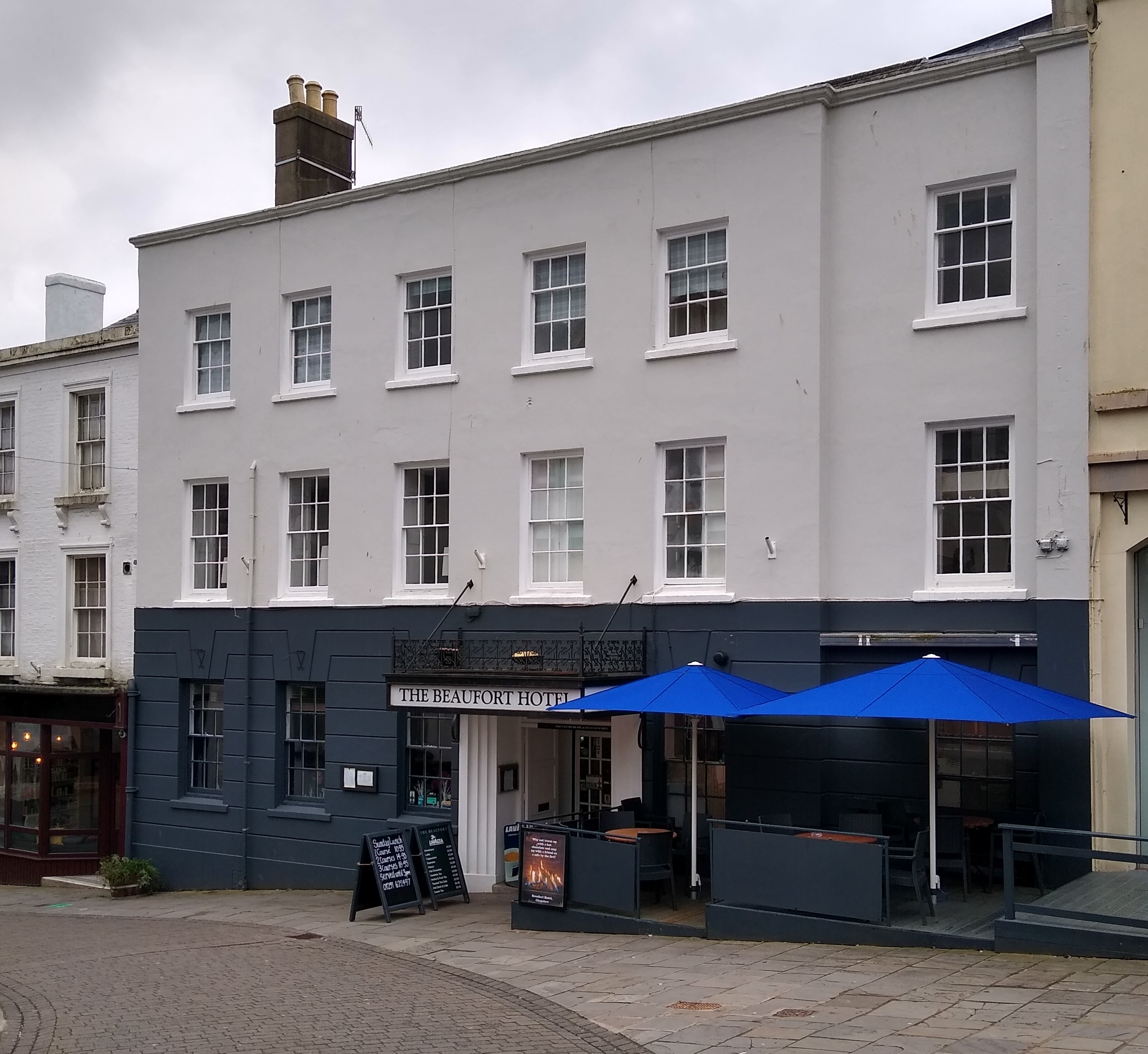

- Location in Monmouthshire

General information
- Location: Chepstow, Monmouthshire, Wales
- Coordinates: 51.6417°N 2.6730°W

Other information
- Number of rooms: 23
- Number of restaurants: 1

The Beaufort Hotel in Chepstow, Wales is located at the southeast corner of Beaufort Square in the town centre. It was designated a Grade II listed building in 1975. It was established in the 16th century as a coaching inn; it claims to be the oldest continuously trading hotel in south Wales. Historically the hotel has served as an auction house.

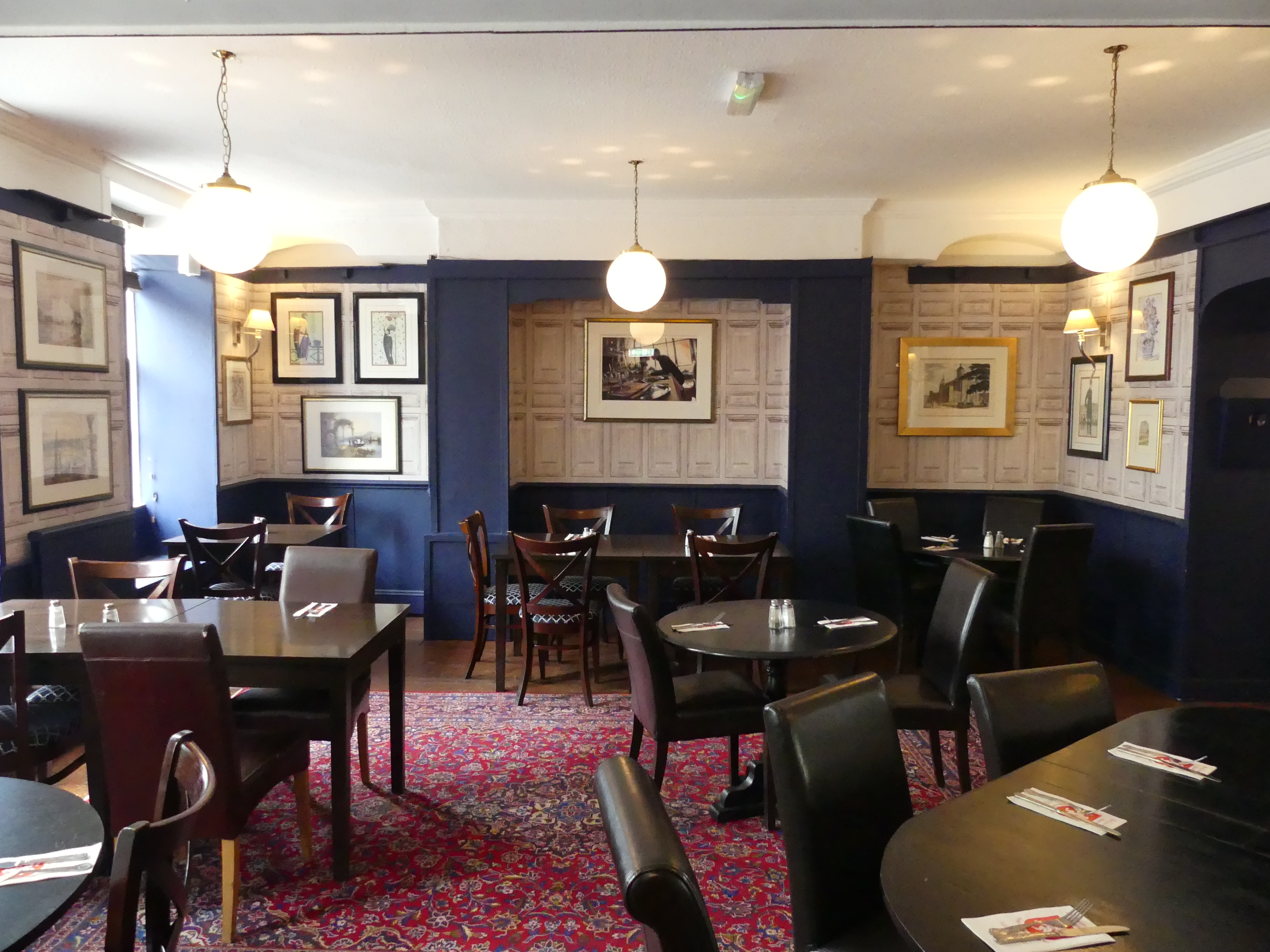
Interior photo
