= Cobourg Hotel =

Former hotel in Tenby, Wales

Coordinates: 51.6721°N 4.6999°W

Cobourg Hotel

Cobourg Hotel was a hotel in Tenby, Pembrokeshire, Wales, situated at the northwest of the High Street, where it joins Crackwell Street. Though an inn had existed on the spot before 1800, a new hotel was built in 1816, and it one of the principal hotels of Tenby. It was in the possession of the Hughes family for much of its history until it was converted into flats in 1982. The current building is known as Ashley Court, and it became a Grade II listed property in 1966.

== History ==
Historically the hotel was one of the main inns in the towns, when it was named the Cobourg Hotel and run by the Hughes family. A hotel is known to have existed in the spot in 1798, though an inscription dated to 1816 on the stairs indicates that it had been rebuilt then by William Maddox, and completed by Ambrose Smith and William Lewis after Maddox's death in 1815.

George Hughes ran the hotel after it opened in 1816 until his death on 18 December 1821. His widow, Elizabeth took control and was proprietor until her own death in 1835. Her son, James Hughes, a shipping agent who operated a steamship business between Tenby and Bristol then ran the hotel with his wife Maria. Hughes was appointed chief magistrate of the town in 1840–41. After his death in September 1857, Maria took over the hotel and was in charge until her death in 1883, after nearly fifty years at the Cobourg.

Maria's youngest son John Bilbie Hughes succeeded her as landlord of the hotel, but six years later his died of gout at just 45, leaving his widow Joyce to co-operate the hotel along with the Royal Station Hotel in Bath until her death in March 1923. Her eldest daughter Gladys succeeded her, and ran them until her death in December 1954. Her son, John Alexander Horner (1920-1989, educated at Monkton Combe School), ran the hotel until in 1982 he announced his retirement. The hotel wine cellar and belongings were auctioned off in the November. An application the following month by the Rural and Coastal Developments of Coventry was approved to convert the hotel into four shops and 15 flats.

== Architecture ==
The current building, Ashley Court, is four storeys with a four-bay stuccoed front with oriel windows has been converted into flats, but retains a later 19th century look. The large rear wing of four storeys, on the southwest side, and overlooks Upper Frog Street. Ashley Court became a Grade II listed building on 22 February 1966.
