= Glewstone Court Hotel =

Building in Marstow, Herefordshire, England

Coordinates: 51°53′55″N 2°38′12″W

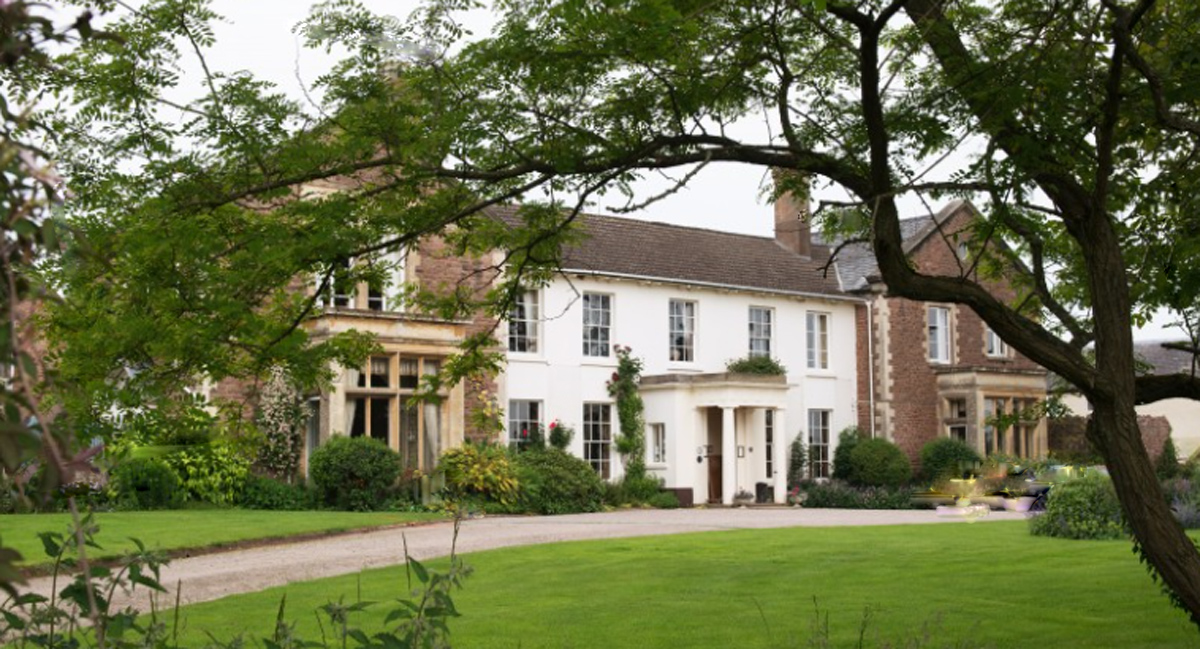
Glewston Court Hotel

Glewstone Court, in the hamlet of Glewstone and the civil parish of Marstow in Herefordshire, England, is a building of historical significance listed on the English Heritage Register It was built in about 1810 for Charles Ballinger, a wealthy landowner from Chalford in Gloucestershire. It is now a country house hotel.

== Charles Ballinger ==
Charles Ballinger built the house in about 1810. He was born in 1773 in Bisley in Gloucestershire. His father’s name was Charles Ballinger and his mother was Elizabeth Webb. His father was a wealthy clothier from Chalford who established a Trust for the benefit of the poor. When his father died in 1798 Charles inherited a substantial fortune. In about 1805 he built Skaiteshill House in Chalford which still exists today.

In 1816 at the age of 43 he married Sarah Jones whose father was Edmund Jones of Poulstone Court in Herefordshire which still exists today. The couple had no children but one of their nephews Walter Ballinger lived nearby in Ross at Weir End Cottage.

In 1825 Charles bought Great Brampton House in Madley. The couple lived there for the next 25 years. Charles died in 1851 and Sarah died in 1860. They were buried in Goodrich Church and there is a memorial plaque on the north wall of the Church.

== Lieutenant Colonel Basil Jackson ==
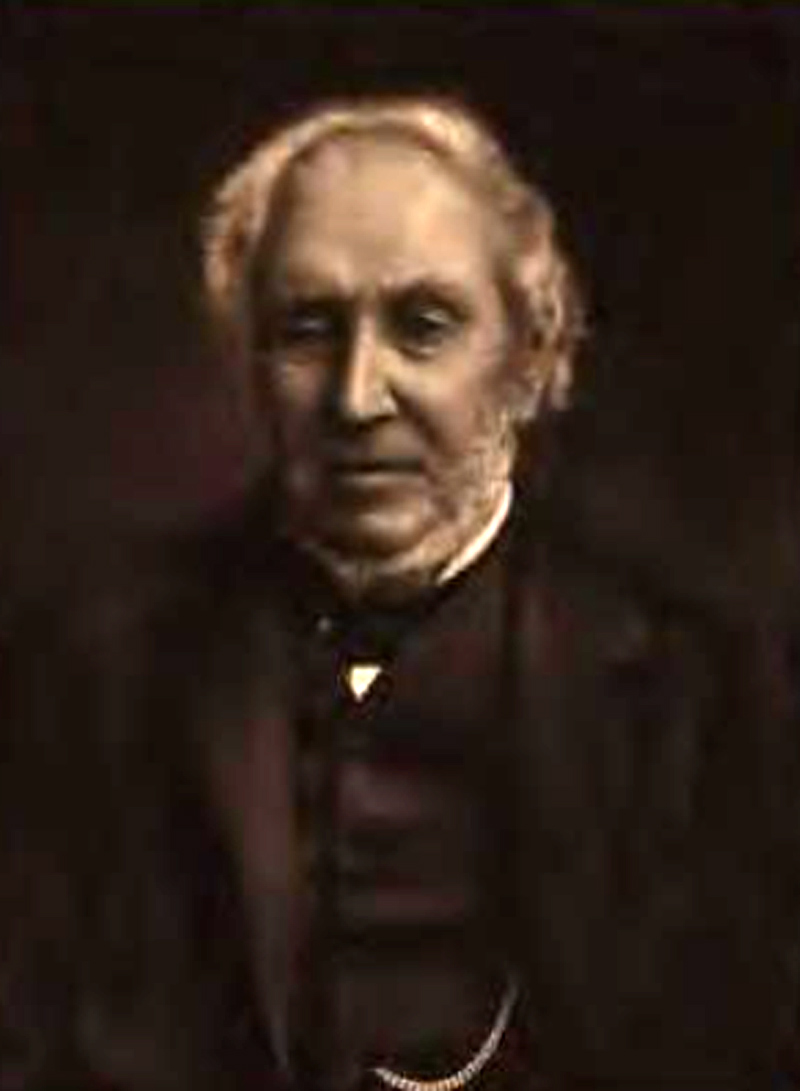
Lieutenant Colonel Basil Jackson

Lieutenant Colonel Basil Jackson came with his wife Frances to live at Glewstone Court in about 1858 shortly after his retirement from the military. He remained there for the next 16 years.

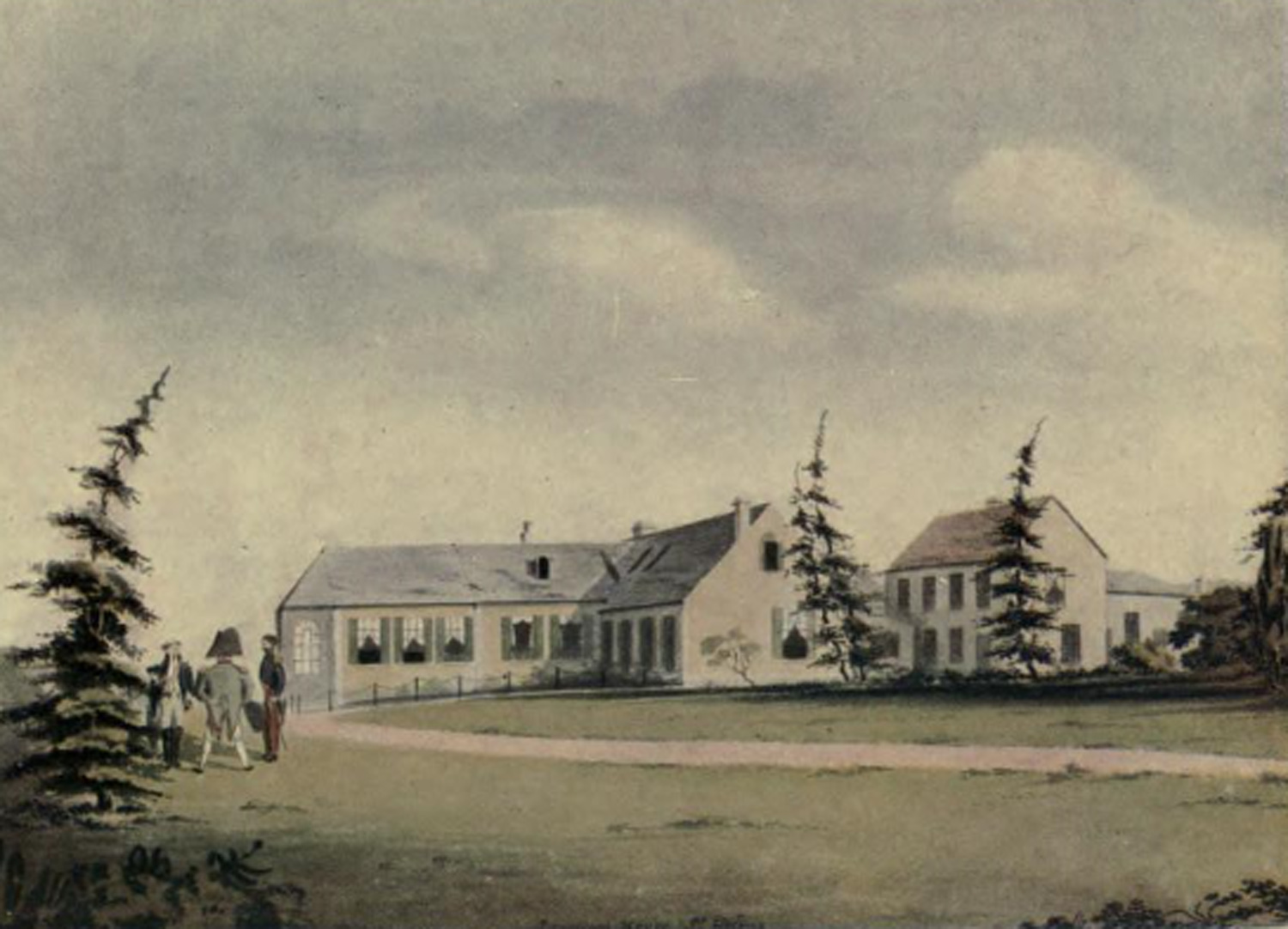
Longwood, St Helena painted by Basil Jackson in 1817 when it was occupied by Napoleon.

Basil Jackson was born in Glasgow in 1795. He was the son of Major Basil Jackson who was in the British Army. He graduated from the Royal Military College in 1811 and was promoted to Lieutenant soon after.

He fought in the Battle of Waterloo and afterwards he was sent to St Helena with Napoleon Bonaparte to assist with the living arrangements for the Emperor’s exile. It is this part of his life that was the most colourful and he wrote several books about this time. He was only 19 years old but he spoke fluent French and was therefore considered to be very suitable to liaise with Bonaparte. He is mentioned frequently in the books that have been written about the Emperor’s exile on St Helena. His duties on the island were to supervise the living arrangements at Longwood House which was the residence of Napoleon. He was a watercolorist and while he was at St Helena he painted Longwood House which is shown. He was at St Helena for four years leaving in 1819 before Bonaparte died.

In 1828 he married Frances (Fanny) Muttlebury and the couple had several children. One of their daughters Charlotte remained single and lived with her parents at Glewstone Court. In 1874 the Jacksons left Glewstone and went to live in Hillborough House in Ross-On-Wye. Basil died in 1889 at the age of 94 years.

== Colonel Charles Henry Harrison ==
Charles Henry Harrison came to live at Glewstone Court in 1875 at the time of his marriage. His wife was Sarah Maria Ballinger the only daughter of Walter Ballinger who as mentioned above was a nephew of Charles Ballinger the original builder of the house. This couple built the additional two Tudor style wings on either side of the house.

Charles Harrison was born in India in 1836. He entered the British Indian Army at the age of 18 and fought in several wars including the Persian and Abyssinian Wars. The Harrisons left Glewstone in about 1885 and moved to Kenilworth in Warwickshire. He died in 1894 at the age of 58.

== Charles Lee Campbell ==
Charles Lee Campbell (1832-1903) and his wife Elizabeth were the next residents and they remained there until about 1897. Lieutenant Colonel Lawrence Corban (1843-1918) and his wife Myra were residents for some years.

The 1911 Census shows that James Rynd Briscoe (1855-1936) a retired merchant and his wife Linda lived at the Court. From about 1925 until his death in 1933 Sir Percy Densham a company director owned the property. For many years Eric Wellington Ward Bailey owned the Court.

One of the most distinguished residents of Glewstone court was Lieutenant General Sir Francis Nosworthy (1887-1971) and his wife Audrey who came there shortly after his retirement in 1945 and remained there for the next ten years. He was Commander in Chief of West African Command during World War II.
