= Killyhevlin Hotel =

Hotel in Enniskillen

Coordinates: 54.330°N 7.620°W

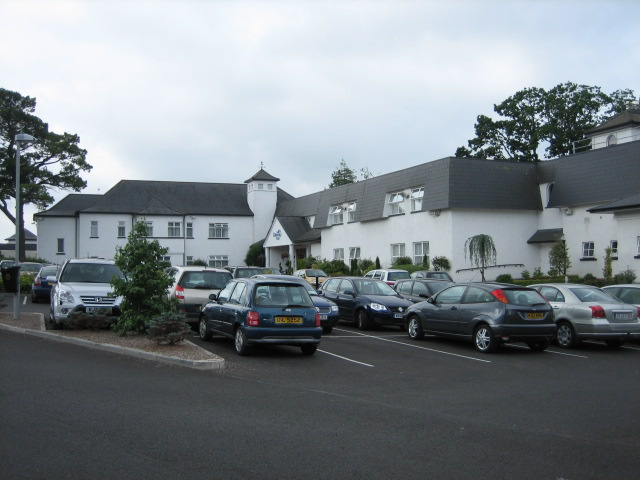

Killyhevlin Hotel is a hotel situated 1 km from Enniskillen, County Fermanagh, Northern Ireland, just off the main A4 Dublin Road. It is a four star 70-bedroom hotel, with restaurant, spa, swimming pool and health club, on the shores of Lough Erne, surrounded by private grounds and gardens. The hotel was originally owned by Raymond B McCartney who was also the entrepreneur who began the Lough Erne Hotel, Kesh and the Belmore Court & Motel, Enniskillen. It has been owned and managed by the Watson family since 1976, who began a major expansion and rebranding initiative in 2004.

== Awards ==
The hotel possesses a four star Quality Standard rating from both the AA and Northern Ireland Tourist Board. In July 2008 the hotel was voted as "Northern Ireland's No.2 Best Place to Stay" by Ulster Television viewers on the Ultimate Ulster show.

In 2008, Rodney Watson, managing director of the hotel was made a Member of the Order of the British Empire (MBE) in recognition for services to tourism over the past 30 years. He had been president of the Northern Ireland Hotels Federation and chairman of Fermanagh Lakeland Tourism.

In June 2011 the hotel won the award for best marketing and sales excellence throughout the provence in the 2011 Northern Ireland Tourism Awards.

== History ==
Over 250 people were evacuated from the hotel, but the explosion injured 17 people, including members of a wedding party, and destroyed much of the recently refurbished hotel. Over 1,000 lbs of homemade explosives had been packed in a vehicle and left at the hotel. The front of the Killyhevlin Hotel collapsed, scores of parked cars were burned and a 12-foot-wide bomb crater was left near the front door.
