= Royal Lion Hotel =

Hotel in Lyme Regis, Dorset, England

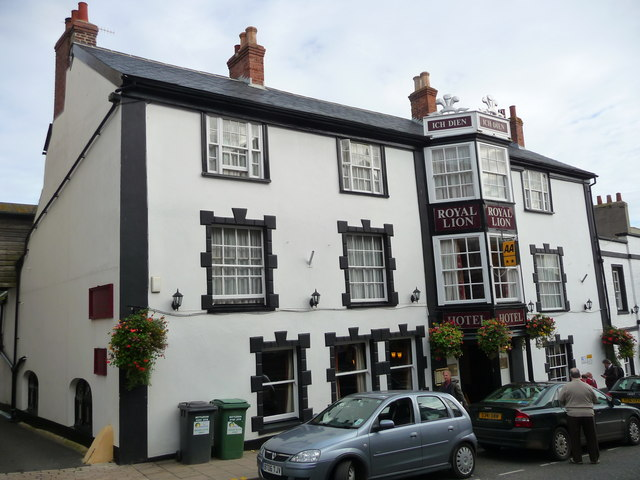

- Location within Dorset

General information
- Location: Lyme Regis, Dorset, England
- Coordinates: 50°43′30″N 2°56′5″W
- Opening: 1610

The Royal Lion Hotel is a hotel in Lyme Regis, Dorset, England. It lies to the northwest of the Lyme Regis Museum, about 100 metres from the sea. It is a former coaching inn, dated to 1610 (although the official site claims 1601).

The hotel has 33 bedrooms and leisure facilities including a swimming pool and sauna. From 2002 until 2022 it was run by Leslie Stone, when it was taken over by brewery Hall & Woodhouse.
