= Hotels in London =

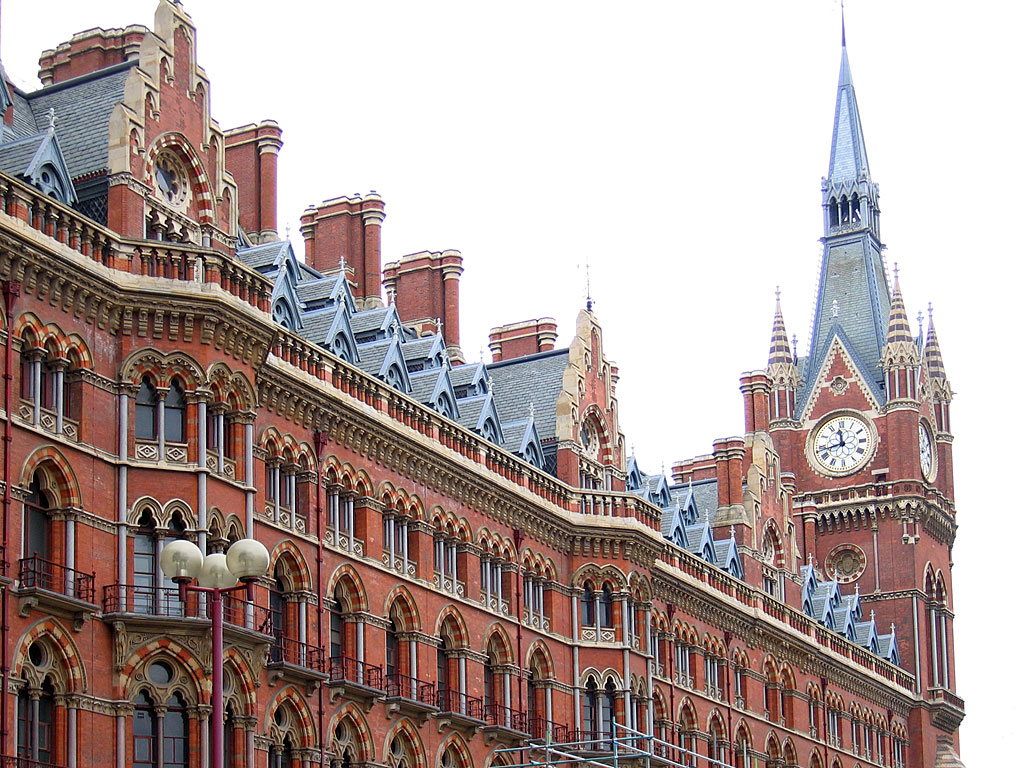
St. Pancras Renaissance London Hotel at St Pancras railway station

This article describes the hotels in London, England.

== History ==
Before the 19th century, there were few, if any, large hotels in London. British country landowners often lived in London for part of the year but they usually rented a house, if the family did not have their own townhouse. The numbers of business and foreign visitors were very small by modern standards, before the Industrial Revolution. The accommodation available to them included gentlemen's club accommodations, lodging houses and coaching inns. Lodging houses were more like private homes with rooms to let than commercial hotels and were often run by widows. Coaching inns served passengers from the stage coaches which were the main means of long-distance passenger transport before railways began to develop in the 1830s. The last surviving galleried coaching inn in London is The George Inn, which now belongs to the National Trust.

A few hotels of a more modern variety began to be built in the early 19th century. For example, Mivart's, the precursor of Claridge's, opened its doors in 1812 but, up to the mid-19th century, London hotels were generally small. In his travel book North America (1862), the novelist Anthony Trollope remarked on how much larger American hotels were than British ones. But, by this time, the railways had already begun to bring far more short-term visitors to London, and the railway companies themselves took the lead in accommodating them by building a series of "railway hotels" near to their London termini. These buildings were seen as status symbols by the railway companies, the largest businesses in the country at the time, and some of them were very grand. They included:

- The Great Western Hotel at Paddington (now the Hilton London Paddington and the first of Britain's railway hotels, built in 1854)
- The Midland Grand Hotel at St. Pancras (closed from 1935 to 2011; now the St. Pancras Renaissance London Hotel.)
- The Great Northern Hotel at King's Cross (recently restored as a boutique hotel)
- The Great Eastern Hotel at Liverpool Street (now the Andaz London Liverpool Street)
- The Charing Cross Hotel at Charing Cross station
- The Great Central Hotel at Marylebone (now The Landmark London)
- The Grosvenor Hotel at Victoria

Many other large hotels were built in London in the Victorian period. The Westminster Palace Hotel (1858), named after its neighbour the Palace of Westminster, i.e. Parliament, was the location of many political meetings. The Langham Hotel was the largest in the city when it opened in 1865. The Savoy, perhaps London's most famous hotel, opened in 1889, the first London hotel with en-suite bathrooms to every room. Nine years later Claridge's was rebuilt in its current form. Another famous hotel, the Ritz, based on its even more celebrated namesake in Paris, opened in 1906.

The upper end of the London hotel business continued to flourish between the two World Wars, boosted by the fact that many landowning families could no longer afford to maintain a London house and therefore began to stay at hotels instead, and by an increasing number of foreign visitors, especially Americans. Famous hotels which opened their doors in this era include the Grosvenor House Hotel and The Dorchester.

The rate of hotel construction in London was fairly low in the quarter-century after World War II and the famous old names retained their dominance of the top end of the market. The most notable hotel of this era was probably the London Hilton, a controversial concrete tower overlooking Hyde Park. Advances in air travel increased the number of overseas visitors to London from 1.6 million in 1963 to 6 million in 1974. In order to provide hotels to meet the extra demand a Hotel Development Incentive Scheme was introduced and a building boom ensued. This led to overcapacity in the London hotel market from the late 1970s to the mid-1980s. Construction then picked up again, but it was soon curtailed by the recession of the early 1990s and the reduction in international travel caused by the 1991 Gulf War.

The 1980s saw London (along with New York) start the trend of smaller boutique-style hotels. In the mid-1990s, many new hotels were opened, including different types from country-house-style hotels in Victorian houses to ultra-trendy minimalist premises. At this time, some of London's grandest early-20th-century office buildings were converted into hotels because their layouts, with long corridors and numerous separate offices, were incompatible with the preference for open-plan working, but their listed status made it hard to get permission to demolish them. This period also saw the opening of the first five-star hotel in London south of the River Thames, the Marriott County Hall Hotel, and the first two in East London, the Four Seasons Canary Wharf and the Marriott West India Quay, which is also close to the Canary Wharf development. For many years, there were no hotels at all in the City of London, even though the financial firms of the city were one of the London hotel sector's most lucrative sources of custom. However, in recent years, over a thousand hotel rooms have opened in the city. Budget hotel chains such as Travel Inn and Travelodge have also been expanding rapidly in London, since the mid-1990s.

One of the most expensive hotels in London is The Lanesborough. Originally a private address (Lanesborough House), in 1733 it was converted into St George's Hospital, and began life as a hotel in 1991.

== Hotels in modern London ==
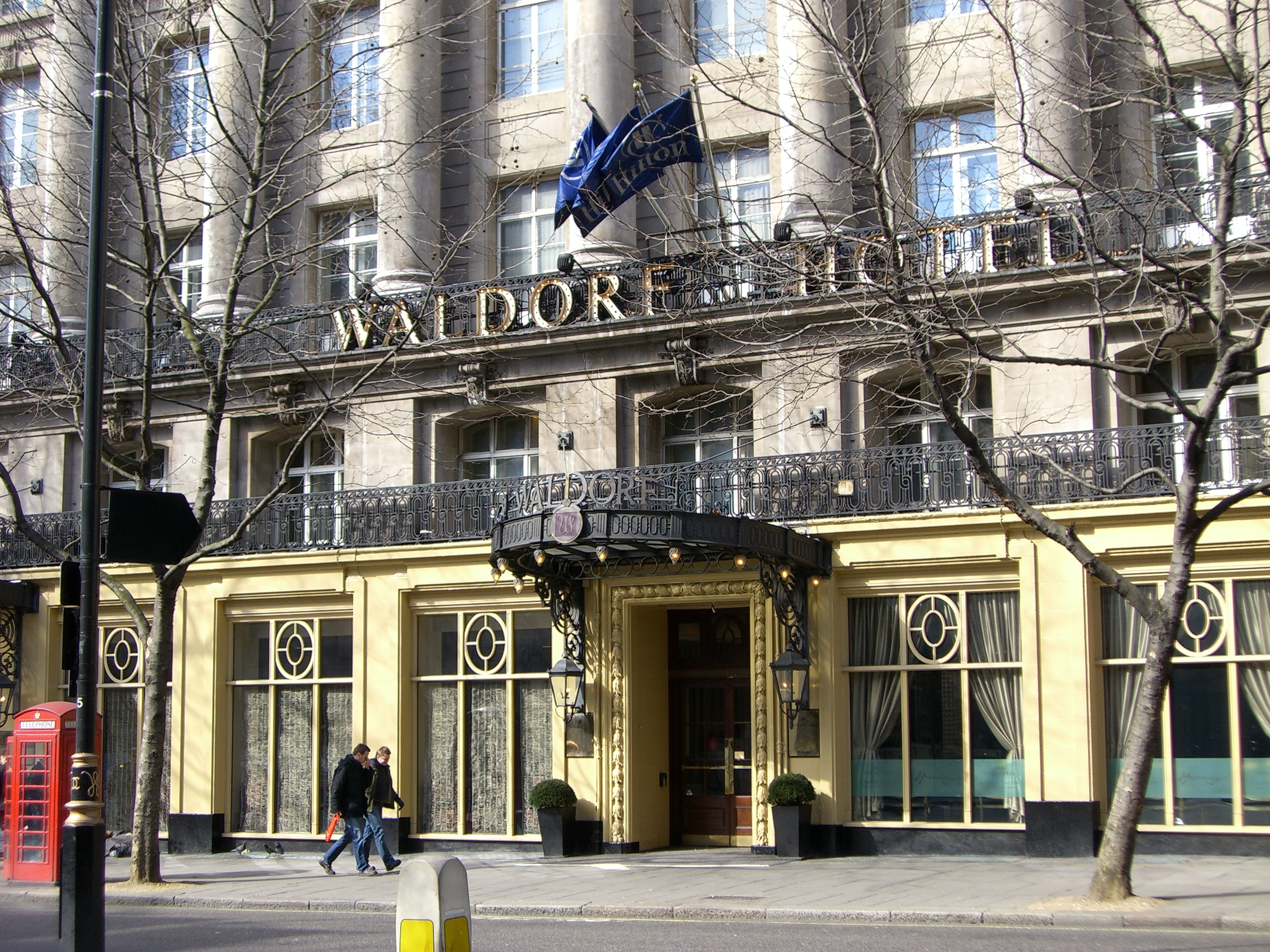
The Waldorf Hilton in Aldwych

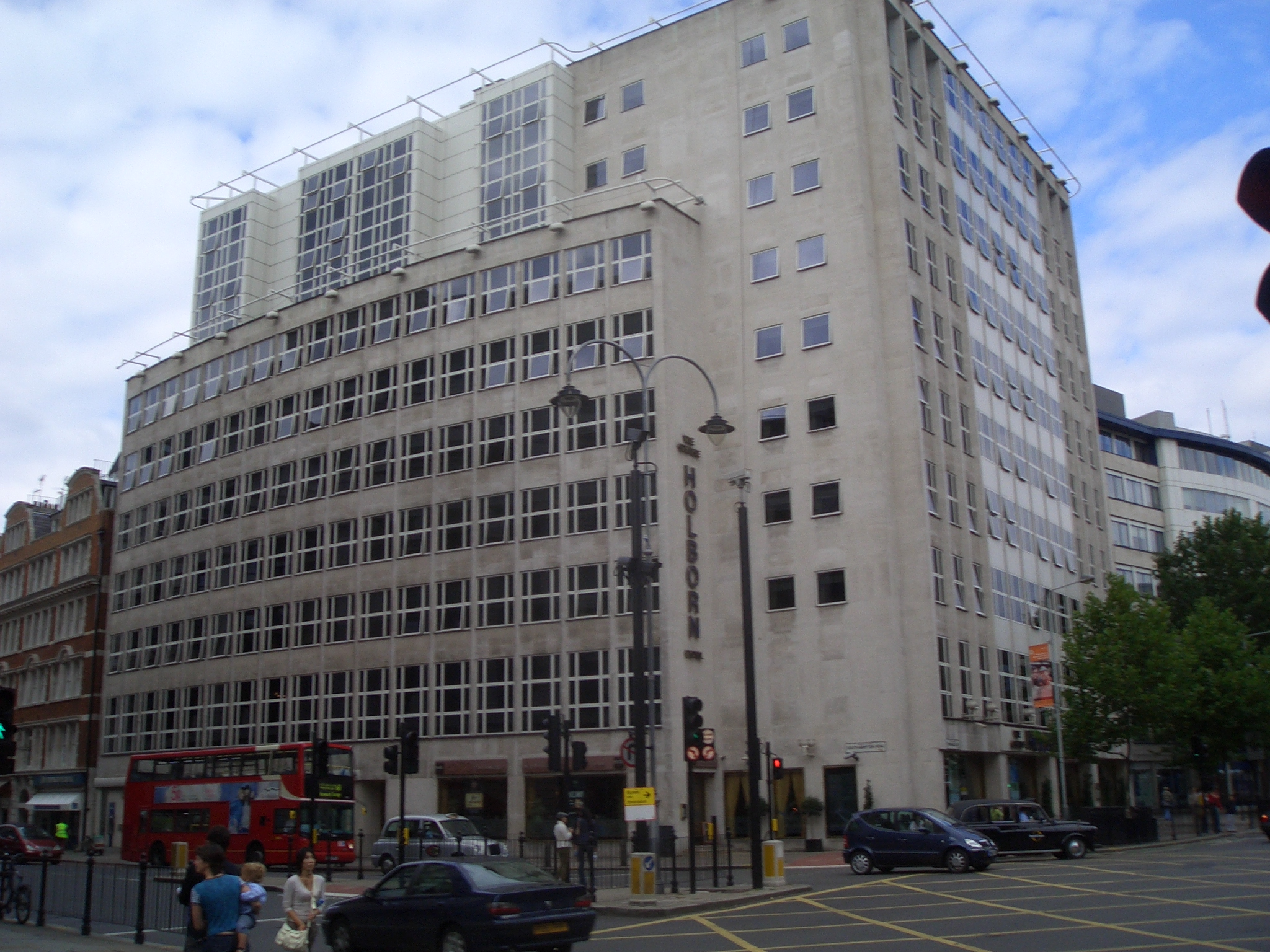
Grange Holborn Hotel in Holborn

There is no official registry of hotel rooms in London, but the estimated number of hotel rooms in Greater London in 2010 was put at 123,000. According to figures produced in support of London's 2012 Olympic bid, there were more than 70,000 three to five-star hotel rooms within 10 kilometres of Central London in 2003. The main growth was a huge rise in the number of rooms within the City of London, while Kensington and Chelsea actually had a small fall. This is comparing figures since 1981. The main concentration of luxury hotels is in the West End, especially in Mayfair and Soho. London's five star hotels are quite small on average by international standards. The largest, Grosvenor House Hotel, has only 494 rooms, and eighteen of them have fifty or fewer. Conversions of existing buildings have remained part of the city's hotel development into the 21st century; the Hotel Riu Plaza London Victoria, near Victoria station, opened in July 2023 following the conversion and redevelopment of a former office property. The range is very wide, including:

- Traditional purpose-built grand hotels such as the Ritz, the Savoy, and the Dorchester
- Recent conversions of grand late 19th- and early 20th-century office buildings into hotels such as One Aldwych and the Renaissance Chancery Court
- Townhouse hotels
- Modern purpose-built chain hotels

=== List of five-star hotels in London ===
There are no official bodies that rate hotels. The most widely accepted bodies are the AA (in the past the RAC too) and the English Tourist Board. The ETB has recently changed its criteria to match that of the AA, to provide consistency. Many hotels remain self-rated.

In February 2015 London was said to be the most expensive city in Europe for hotel rooms judged by advertised rates.

Hotel	Location	Rooms	Notes
11 Cadogan Gardens	Chelsea	56	Victorian boutique hotel, part of Relais & Châteaux
41 Hotel	Westminster	20	Boutique hotel
45 Park Lane	Mayfair	46	Opened in 2011, part of the Dorchester Collection
Andaz London Liverpool Street	City of London	267	Victorian railway hotel built as Great Eastern Hotel; reopened 2000
The Athenaeum Hotel	Mayfair	123	Modern family owned and run hotel
Baglioni Hotel	South Kensington	67	Occupies a group of Victorian houses
Beaumont Hotel	Mayfair	73	Occupies a 1926 multi-story car park
The Bentley London	South Kensington	64	Occupies Victorian buildings
The Berkeley	Belgravia	214	Modern building; opened 1972. Rooftop pool.
Blakes Hotel	South Kensington	51	Occupies a group of Victorian houses
Brown's Hotel	Mayfair	115	Occupies eleven townhouses
Café Royal	Piccadilly	160	Opened the first dessert restaurant in London in March 2016
Canary Riverside Plaza	Canary Wharf	142	Opened c. 2001
Capital Hotel	Knightsbridge	49	Privately owned townhouse hotel
Carlton Tower Hotel	Knightsbridge	216	Modern, also known as Jumeirah Carlton Tower
Charlotte Street Hotel	Fitzrovia	52	Modern - opened in 2000
The Chelsea Harbour Hotel	Chelsea	160	Modern; overlooks the marina at Chelsea Harbour, part of Millennium & Copthorne Hotels
The Chelsea Townhouse	Chelsea	35	Occupies three 1890s houses
Churchill Hotel	Marylebone	440	Modern, opened in 1970. Built on 16th-century estate.
Claridge's	Mayfair	203	London's most aristocratic hotel; founded 1812 and rebuilt 1898; Art Deco
The Connaught	Mayfair	121	Traditional grand hotel
Corinthia Hotel London	Embankment	283	Modern luxury spa hotel
Courthouse Hotel	Soho	116	Occupies a classical former magistrates court
Covent Garden Hotel	Covent Garden	58	English country house style
The Dorchester	Mayfair	238	Opened 1931; art deco exterior and "Georgian country house" rooms
Egerton House	South Kensington	30	The Red Carnation Hotel Collection
Four Seasons Hotel London at Park Lane	Mayfair	220	Built in 1970 as the Inn on the Park
The Franklin Hotel	Knightsbridge	35	Reopened in 2016, spanning four Victorian houses; designed by Anouska Hempel
The Goring	Victoria	74	Built 1910; traditional English style
Grosvenor House Hotel	Mayfair	494	Built 1928; a JW Marriott hotel with the most rooms of any central London 5-star hotel
Halkin Hotel	Belgravia	41	Modern, styled as The Halkin by COMO
Haymarket Hotel	St James's	50	Boutique hotel, part of Firmdale Hotels Group
Ham Yard Hotel	Soho	91	Boutique Hotel, part of Firmdale Hotels Group
Hempel Hotel	Bayswater	40	Currently closed
Hotel Russell	Bloomsbury	334	Built in 1898 in French chateau style by Charles Fitzroy Doll
InterContinental London Park Lane Hotel	Mayfair	447	Modern, built in 1975
InterContinental London O2	Canary Wharf	453	Modern, built in 2016
Knightsbridge Hotel	Knightsbridge	44	Boutique Hotel, part of Firmdale Hotels Group
The Landmark London	Marylebone Road	299	Victorian grand hotel; opened in 1899 as a railway hotel
L'oscar London	Holborn	39	Boutique hotel opened in 2018
The Lanesborough	Knightsbridge	95	Grand hotel, opened in 1991 in a converted 19th century hospital
The Langham	Marylebone	429	London's largest hotel when it opened in 1865
Le Meridien Hotel Piccadilly	Mayfair	266	Traditional grand hotel
London Hilton on Park Lane	Mayfair	453	Modern; London's tallest hotel
London Marriott Hotel Grosvenor Square	Mayfair	221	Early 20th century neo-Georgian
Mandarin Oriental Hyde Park, London	Knightsbridge	200	Edwardian building opened in 1902
Marriott Canary Wharf	Canary Wharf	348	Built 2004; 301 rooms and 47 apartments
Marriott County Hall Hotel	South Bank	200	Occupies part of the neo-baroque London County Hall
Marriott Grand Residence	Mayfair	49	Built 1926
Marriott London Park Lane	Mayfair	157	Built as apartments in 1919
The May Fair	Mayfair	404	Eclectic-luxury design
M By Montcalm Shoreditch Tech City Hotel	City of London	269	Contemporary-style, 18-story hotel
The Metropolitan	Park Lane	144	Contemporary central London hotel by COMO. Park Lane location.
Milestone Hotel	Kensington	62	Built in 1884 as a private house
The Montcalm London Marble Arch	Marylebone	153	5 star hotel
One Aldwych	The Strand	105	Early 21st-century interiors in an early 20th-century neo-baroque office building
The Park Tower Knightsbridge Hotel	Knightsbridge	181	Modern
Plaza On The River Club And Residence	Lambeth	66	
The Prince Akatoki London	Marble Arch	82	Boutique hotel - opened in 2009, formerly The Arch, now part of Prince Hotels
Radisson Blu Edwardian, Hampshire	Leicester Square	124	English country house style
Radisson Blu Edwardian, Heathrow	Heathrow	459	Modern
Rafayel on the Left Bank	Battersea	65	Eco-friendly boutique hotel on the south side of the river next to London heliport
The Ritz London	St James's	133	Opened 1906; French chateau style building; called "the most romantic hotel in the world" by Sophia Loren
Rosewood London Hotel	Holborn	356	Opened in the 1990s as Renaissance Chancery Court in a grand 1914 former office building
Royal Garden Hotel	Kensington	398	Modern
The Royal Horseguards Hotel	Whitehall	140	Grade I listed. The original building was constructed as a block of luxury residential apartments in 1884.
Sanderson Hotel	Fitzrovia	150	Ian Schrage minimalist hotel
San Domenico House	Chelsea	19	Occupies some Victorian houses
The Savoy	The Strand	267	Traditional grand hotel; opened 1889; first in London with en-suite bathroom to all rooms. Closed in December 2007 for £100 million refurbishment. Reopened 2010.
Sheraton Grand London Park Lane	Mayfair	307	Traditional grand hotel
Sheraton Skyline Hotel at London Heathrow	Heathrow	350	Modern style
Sofitel St. James	St James's	186	Opened c. 2000 in a grand classical former bank headquarters
Soho Hotel	Soho	96	Part of the Firmdale Hotels group
Stafford Hotel	St James's	80	English country house style
St Martins Lane Hotel	Covent Garden	204	1990s Philippe Starck minimalism in a 1960s office block
St. Pancras Renaissance	Kings Cross	245	The former Midland Grand Hotel
Taj 51 Buckingham Gate	Westminster	85	Officially known as Taj 51 Buckingham Gate Suites and Residences
Threadneedles Hotel	City of London	69	Occupies a banking hall built in 1865
Trafalgar Hilton	Trafalgar Square	129	Opened 2001; contemporary building behind a retained facade
The Waldorf Hilton, London	The Strand	303	Grand hotel built in 1908
Wellesley Hotel	Knightsbridge	36	Claimed to be the first 6 star London hotel when it opened
100 Queen's Gate Hotel London	London	228	Nestled in a historical building, opened in 2019, former DoubleTree by Hilton Hotel London - Kensington

=== Other notable hotels ===
- One of the more unusual hotels is the Sunborn London, a floating hotel by the Excel center in East London and constructed specifically as a stationary floating hotel (it has no engine). The original yacht was sold to the Lagos government and has now been replaced with a larger yacht at the same berth.
- The 3-star 1,630-bedroom Royal National Hotel in Bloomsbury is the largest hotel in the United Kingdom by the number of rooms, with 1,271.
- The Hilton London Metropole Hotel in Paddington is the largest 4-star hotel in London and the United Kingdom. It has 1,058 bedrooms and extensive conference facilities.
- The Guoman Tower Hotel (formerly Thistle) near Tower Bridge is one of the largest hotels in London, with over 800 bedrooms, and is regarded by some as one of the ugliest - it was twice voted the second ugliest building in London, in a 2005 Time Out poll, and in a 2006 BBC poll - and most insensitively located brutalist buildings in the city. However, others find its location by St Katharine Docks and the Tower of London quite relaxing and scenic.
- The Regent Palace Hotel, which was located on the northern side of Piccadilly Circus, closed in December 2006. Notable as having been Europe's largest hotel in terms of room numbers (1028) when it opened on May 16, 1915.

=== Events ===
After the 2006 transatlantic aircraft plot London hotels showed a drop in average room rate growth and occupancy growth. However, this was not as steep as might have been expected since figures were compared to the previous year's figures which were themselves affected by the July 7th London bombings of 2005. It is thought without those circumstances the real drop would have been something in the region of 20-30%. Strangely while figures showed a drop in bookings some major chains such as Intercontinental reported strong demand for hotel rooms in London as passengers became stranded in London unable to get a flight.

In November 2006, several hotels were subject to checks for radiation after former Russian spy Alexander Litvinenko was poisoned with Polonium-210. Most seriously affected was the Millennium Mayfair where seven members of staff were found to be contaminated with low-level radiation.

November 2006 was also the month Dhiren Barot was sentenced by a British court to serve at least 40 years in prison for planning to cause explosions in London Hotels amongst a list of targets which also included the New York Stock Exchange and the World Bank.

January 2007 saw the first use anywhere in the world of Cryonite technology to kill bed bugs (freezes pests using a patented carbon dioxide snow) at a top London Hotel (unnamed).

In February 2010, a murder took place in the Landmark Hotel, one of the most expensive hotels in London.

November 2014, a gas explosion caused 14 injuries at the luxury Hyatt Regency Churchill Hotel

In March 2007 Westminster council released reports saying some of London's best known hotels had been considered a “serious danger to health” by environmental inspectors in previous years. The hotels were the Savoy, the Halkin, the Langham and the Dorchester. The Langham received confirmation from Westminster Council that "everything was in good order" in May 2006, and the Dorchester disinfected their air conditioning system in response to legionella bacteria found in bedrooms.

== See also ==
- Lists of hotels – an index of hotel list articles on Wikipedia
