= Egerton House =

Egerton House may refer to:

- Egerton House, Berkhamsted
- Egerton House, Newmarket Heath, stable for race horses and stud in Suffolk
- Egerton House Hotel, London
- Egerton Grey Country House Hotel, Vale of Glamorgan
