= British LGBT Awards =

British award show

- Awarded for: LGBTQ activism
- Country: United Kingdom
- Website: britishlgbtawards.com

The British LGBT Awards are a British award show that aim to "recognise individuals and organizations that display outstanding commitment to the LGBTQ community".

The awards were founded in 2014 by Sarah Garrett. LGBT celebrities and straight allies are among the people that are recognised at the ceremony, held annually at the London Marriott Hotel County Hall in Westminster.

== History ==
In 2020, the awards were delayed due to COVID-19 pandemic. Ultimately the ceremony were held virtually on 27 November 2020.

In 2021, the awards returned to an in-person ceremony and were held on 27 August 2021.

The 2023 awards were held on 23 June 2023. The awards were protested by queer climate activists, who sought to draw attention to the awards' sponsorship deals with Shell plc and BP, alongside financial institutions known to finance fossil fuel projects, including HSBC, Santander Bank and Macquarie Capital. Several nominees withdrew after activists raised concerns with them, alongside the planned MC, Sue Perkins.

In 2024, Robin Windsor was posthumously awarded.
