= Montcalm East =

Hotel in London, England

Coordinates: 51.5279°N 0.0889°W

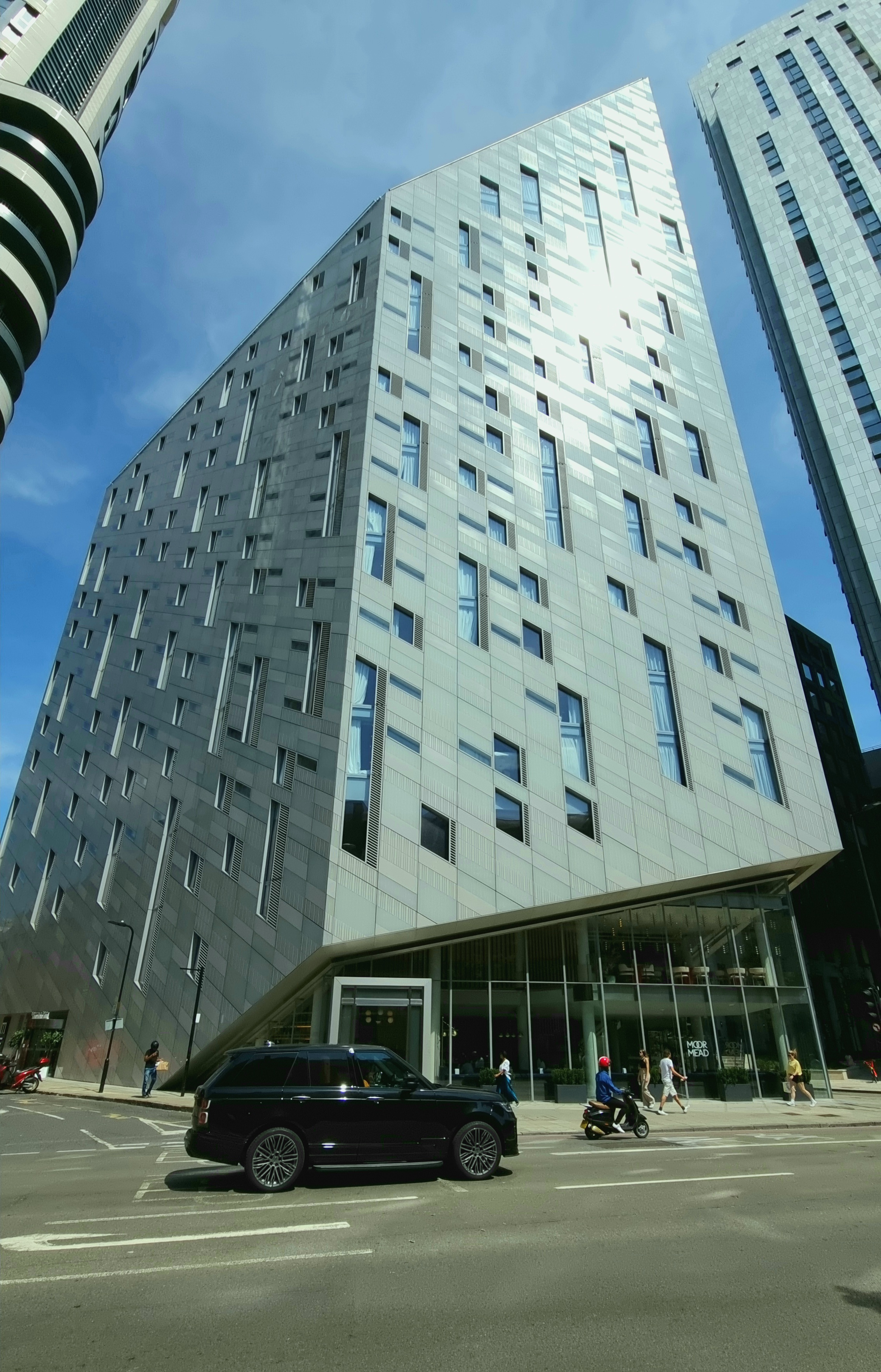
- Interactive map of the Montcalm East area

Other information
- Number of rooms: 269
- Number of restaurants: 2

Website
- Official website

Montcalm East is an 18-storey hotel in the Shoreditch area of Hackney, London. Opened in 2015, the 269-room hotel is part of The Montcalm group.

== Background ==
The hotel opened as the "Shoreditch Tech City" in May 2015, in the "Silicon Roundabout" area on City Road, on the corner between Britannia Walk and Provost Street. A new-built tower, it was designed by London-based architect firm Squire and Partners, and is in the shape of an elongated diamond, with its point jutting into City Road.
