= Praed Street =

Street in Paddington, London

Coordinates: 51°31′1.2″N 0°10′23″W

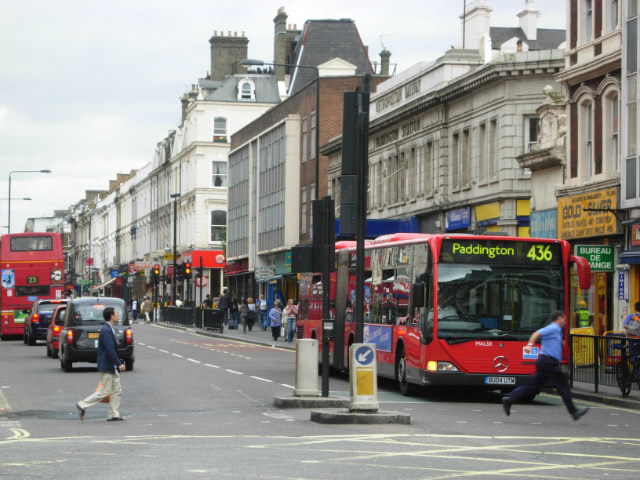
- Praed Street in 2007
- Length: 0.4 mi (0.64 km)
- Location: Paddington, London, United Kingdom
- Postal code: W2
- Nearest train station: London Paddington; Paddington (Circle and Hammersmith & City lines); Paddington (Bakerloo, Circle and District lines)
- South end: Edgware Road
- West end: Eastbourne Terrace

Other
- Known for: London Paddington station; the Great Western Hotel; St Mary's Hospital

Praed Street (/preɪd/) is a street in Paddington, west London, in the City of Westminster, most notable for being the location of London Paddington station and St Mary's Hospital, London. It runs south-westerly, straight from Edgware Road to Craven Road, Spring Street and Eastbourne Terrace. East of Norfolk Place, the street is one-way eastbound; westbound traffic has to use Sussex Gardens and Norfolk Place, and this includes the eight London bus routes that serve the street: the 7, 23, 27, 36, 205, N7, N27 and N205.

== History ==
Praed Street was originally laid out in the early 19th century, being built up in 1828. It was named after William Praed, chairman of the company which built the canal basin which lies just to the north.

In 1893 plans were put forward by the Edgware Road and Victoria Railway company to build an underground railway along the Edgware Road which included the construction of a Tube station at Praed Street. The scheme was rejected by Parliament and the line was never built.

== Overview ==
On the north west side of the street are Paddington Station and the Great Western Hotel, the Royal Mail Western depot, and St Mary's Hospital. The south east side is predominantly retail but includes the frontage for Paddington Underground (Bakerloo, Circle and District lines) station. At the far north east end, on the north west side, is a prominent 1980s extension to the Hilton London Metropole Hotel.

Morocco maintains a consulate at number 97-99.

== In literature and film ==
Solar Pons, a pastiche of Sherlock Holmes created by August Derleth, had his home at 7B Praed Street.

American poet Richard Hugo wrote the poem "Walking Praed Street", which first appeared in his book of poems, The Lady in Kicking Horse Reservoir. The poem's first two lines are said to be two of the greatest American lines ever written: "I've walked this street in far too many towns./ The weather, briefly: in Salerno, rain."

Praed Street appeared in the political thriller novel House of Cards, and subsequently in its television adaptation, as an accommodation address set up by main protagonist Francis Urquhart as part of a plot to force the resignation of the sitting prime minister.

Praed Street is the setting for the 1928 novel The Murders in Praed Street by John Rhode.

Praed Street is mentioned in Ira Levin's Rosemary's Baby. Somebody compares a house there with the house (Bramford in New York) where the protagonists live: "There was a house in London, on Praed Street, in which five separate brutal murders took place within sixty years."

In The Looking-Glass War by John le Carré a handful of old men hovered between pornography shops and the pimps on the corner (chapter thirteen).

In The Dark Labyrinth by Lawrence Durrell, a character complains he 'could not be carried away by fairy tales of the Second Coming written in this Praed Street vein' (chapter three).

== See also ==
- List of eponymous roads in London
