= The Landmark London =

Hotel in London

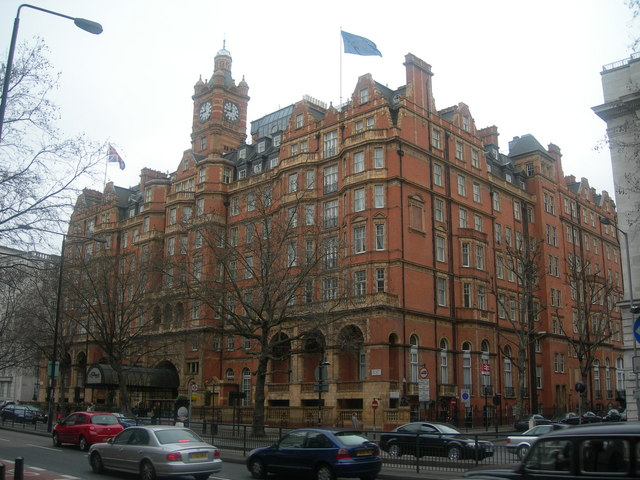

- Location within Central London

General information
- Location: 222 Marylebone Road; London, England
- Coordinates: 51°31′18.12″N 0°9′46.08″W
- Opened: 1899

Website
- landmarklondon.co.uk

The Landmark London is a five-star hotel on Marylebone Road on the northern side of central London, England, in the City of Westminster. It was originally opened by the Great Central Railway, as the Hotel Great Central. As one of London's railway hotels, it declined after the advent of the motor car. It served as a military convalescent home during the Second World War, and later as the headquarters of the British Railways Board. It reopened as a hotel in 1993.

== History ==
=== Early years ===
The hotel was originally one of London's Victorian era railway hotels, the Hotel Great Central. It was first proposed by Sir Edward Watkin of the Great Central Railway, who envisaged Marylebone station, which the hotel was to serve, as the hub of an international railway that would run through a channel tunnel. Sir Edward's aspirations proved to be overly ambitious (not for the only time, as he was behind the Watkins' Tower, a failed attempt to outdo the Eiffel Tower), and after the Great Central ran into financial difficulties, the site of the hotel was sold to Sir John Blundell Maple of the furniture company Maples, who opened the hotel in 1899.

Marylebone station is one of the smallest of the central London termini, but its hotel was among the grandest of the London railway hotels. It had a clock tower and was built around a large central courtyard. There were two main entrances, one on the northern side facing the station and the other on the southern side towards Marylebone Road. The architect was Colonel Sir Robert William Edis and the style was eclectic and opulent. The Ladies' Alpine Club rented rooms in the hotel and held its annual dinner there.

=== Decline and military usage ===
In the 1920s the central courtyard became a winter garden, but the building's first period as a hotel was drawing to a close. With railway traffic falling due to the advent of the motor car, London's railway hotels were among the most vulnerable of the city's grand hotels as they were not in the most fashionable districts. The Great Central fell out of hotel use for over forty years. It was a convalescent home during the Second World War and served as a military office building for many years afterwards as well as the headquarters of the British Railways Board, and was referred to by railway staff as "The Kremlin".

=== Restoration ===
In a pattern that was followed by several of the railway hotels, it later returned to its original use, as demand for luxury hotels in London grew and the city centre expanded during the late 20th and early 21st centuries. The building was purchased by a Japanese company in 1986, and it was restored and reopened as a hotel in 1993 as The Regent, London.

In 1995, it was purchased by the Lancaster Landmark Hotel Company Limited, and renamed The Landmark London. The Landmark Group is a Thai company that opened its first hotel in 1987, and it owns several other hotels in London. The hotel now has 300 rooms and suites.
