= Hilton London Metropole =

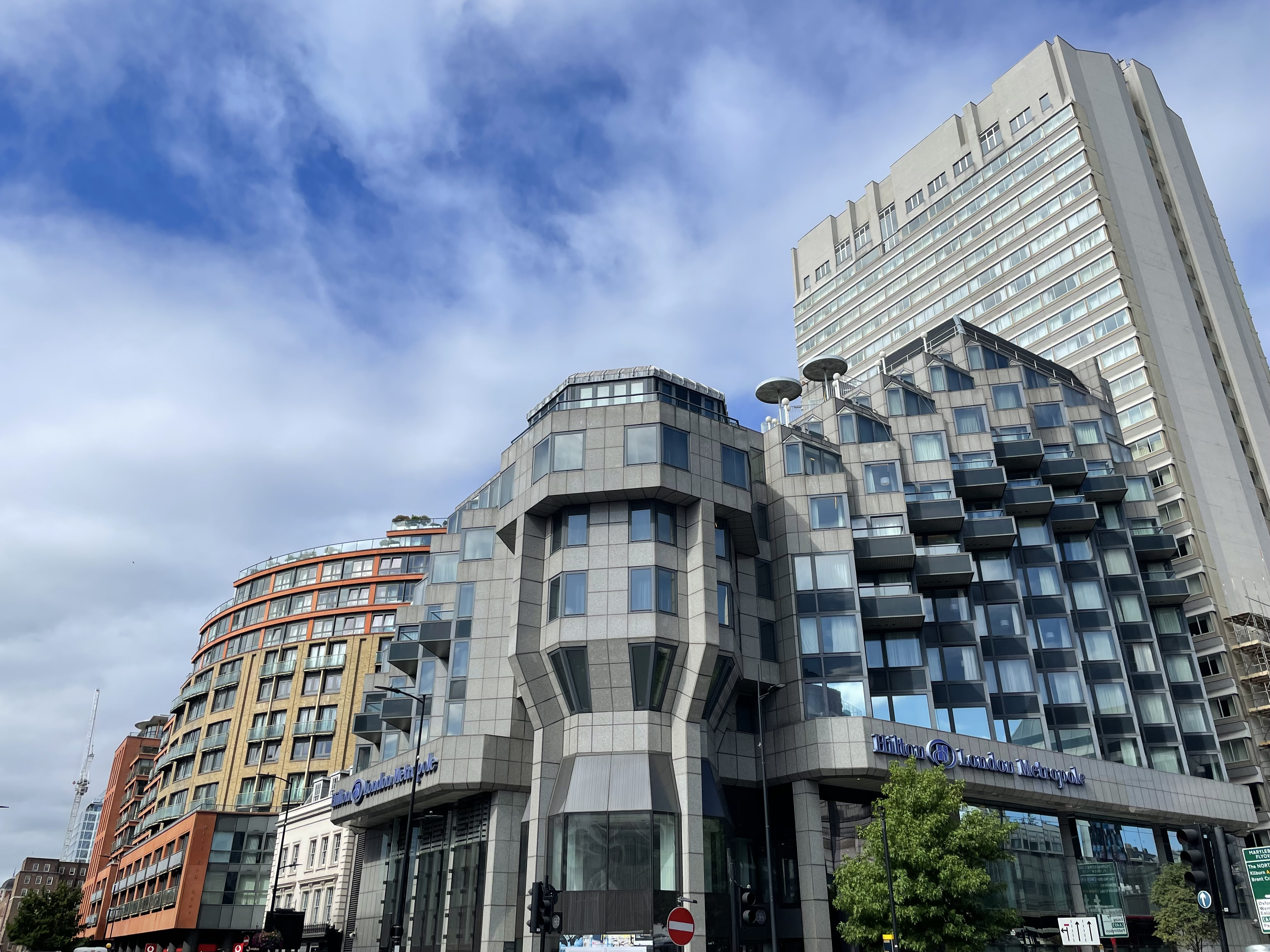
- Hilton London Metropole - 1989 wing in foreground, original 1972 tower behind it on the right
- Interactive map of the Hilton London Metropole area
- Hotel chain: Hilton Hotels & Resorts

General information
- Status: Open
- Type: Hotel
- Classification: 4 stars
- Location: London, W2 1JU; United Kingdom, 225 Edgware Road, London, United Kingdom
- Coordinates: 51.519336°N 0.169490°W
- Completed: 1972
- Opening: Jul 1999
- Owner: Henderson Park

Technical details
- Floor count: 24

Other information
- Number of restaurants: 1
- Parking: Yes

Website
- www.hilton.com/en/hotels/lonmetw-hilton-london-metropole/

The Hilton London Metropole is a 1,100-room 4-star hotel and conference centre located on Edgware Road in the City of Westminster, Greater London. It is bounded by the Marylebone Flyover to the north, Praed Street to the south, and the Paddington Basin development to the west.

== History ==
The London Metropole Hotel opened in 1972. Designed by noted modernist architect Richard Seifert, it consisted of a 24-storey 91-metre (299 ft) tower, one of the tallest buildings in the City of Westminster. A second wing, of 11 storeys, was added in 1989.

The Metropole Hotels chain was sold by Lonrho to Stakis Hotels in 1996 and the property was renamed Stakis London Metropole. Ladbroke bought Stakis Hotels in 1999 and rebranded the 48 Stakis Hotels within their Hilton Hotels brand, with the property renamed Hilton London Metropole. A 16-storey 52-metre (171 ft) third wing was added to the hotel in 2000, including a conference centre, making it the biggest conference hotel in London, with 39 meeting rooms.

In April 2014 the hotel was the venue for the 44th World Irish Dancing Championship, the first held in England. Hilton sold the hotel, along with the Hilton Birmingham Metropole, to the Tonstate Group in 2006 for £417m. Tonstate sold the two properties to Henderson Park for £500 million in 2017.

== See also ==
- Hotels in London
- Hilton London Paddington, nearby sister hotel
- Paddington Waterside, strategy for the redevelopment of the area between the Metropole and the railway
