= San Domenico House =

English hotel

- Location within Central London

General information
- Location: 29-31 Draycott Place, Chelsea, London, SW3 2SH, United Kingdom
- Coordinates: 51°29′30″N 0°09′42″W
- Owner: Aldo Melpignano
- Operator: San Domenico Hotels

Other information
- Number of rooms: 19
- Number of suites: 9

Website
- www.sandomenicohouse.com

San Domenico House is a boutique hotel located at 29-32 Draycott Place, in Chelsea, London. The hotel has 19 rooms and is part of the San Domenico Hotels group, owned by Aldo Melpignano, and it is a sister hotel to the Borgo Egnazia. It was previously known as the Sloane Hotel until 2006, when it was located at number 29 Draycott Place.

== Architecture and furnishings ==
The hotel occupies two adjacent Victorian townhouses built from red brick. The interiors feature a mix of neo-classical and Italian design elements, with antique furniture, tapestries, and 19th-century European artwork, including Royal portraits and decorative pieces. The lobby is finished with marble. The reception room of the hotel features a cabinet which displays items such as military medals and evening bags. The drawing room, adjacent to the reception room, has a range of antique furniture from an ormolu chest of drawers and walnut tallboy, to Empire-era clocks and vases.

Six of the bedrooms are known as "gallery rooms", which contain mezzanine sitting areas and silk-canopied four-poster beds, though the rooms are each unique with a range of different themes and designs from notable designers. Sarah Barrell of The Independent describes Gallery suite 104 as the "brown" room, furnished with "biscuit brown furry throws, dotted with chocolate cushions, heavy brocade curtains". The Deluxe rooms, measuring 30 square feet, are typically furnished with rare Italian artwork, and the original commodes and mirrors from the 19th century. Duncan notes that several of these older rooms "mix Signora Melpignano’s singular style with antiques and pictures inherited from the Sloane Hotel" but states that the newer rooms are purely Italianate. The Superior Double rooms measure 27 square feet.

== Services ==
Even though San Domenico House does not have its own restaurant, it provides a room service and breakfast. Each room contains a refrigerated minibar, with non-alcoholic drinks, though alcoholic beverages can be ordered from the room service menu. The two double suites on the top floor are intended for large families, and are complemented with a children's menu and games and babysitting services which can be requested.

== Bibliography ==
- Brown, Karen (2006). Karen Brown's England, Wales and Scotland: Exceptional Places to Stay and Itineraries. Karen Brown's Guides. ISBN 978-1-933810-02-7.
- Olson, Donald; Brewer, Stephen; Strachan, Donald (14 February 2012). Frommer's Great Britain Day by Day. John Wiley & Sons. ISBN 978-0-470-64869-8.
