= Egerton Grey Country House Hotel =

Hotel in Barry, Wales

- Location within Vale of Glamorgan

General information
- Location: Barry, Vale of Glamorgan, Wales, United Kingdom
- Opening: 1988
- Closed: 2010

Egerton Grey Country House Hotel was an AA four star listed hotel located near the Bristol Channel in Barry in the Vale of Glamorgan, south Wales.

The house was originally built in the 17th century and functioned as a rectory for some time. It opened as a luxury hotel in 1988 and retained its Edwardian bathrooms, open fireplaces, and antique furnishings including paintings and porcelain. The hotel had 10 ensuite rooms, with many of the rooms retaining their Victorian or Edwardian appearance with four-poster beds etc.

The hotel was featured in the Doctor Who universe twice, once in the series one serial of The Sarah Jane Adventures, 'Eye of the Gorgon' and again in a series four episode of Doctor Who, 'Turn Left'. The two appearances are not related however: in The Sarah Jane Adventures it was a care home for the elderly, and in Doctor Who it was as a hotel for Donna Noble's family. The hotel closed for business in 2010.
