= Rafayel on the Left Bank =

Hotel in Battersea, London

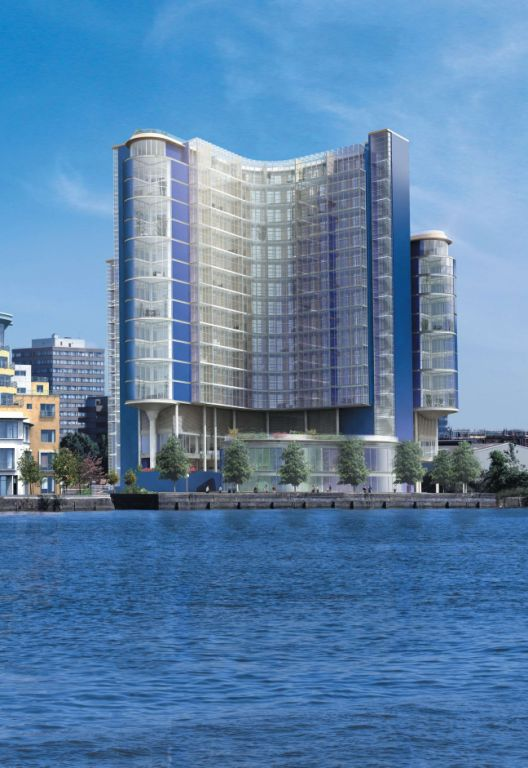
- Falcon Wharf

- Location within Greater London

General information
- Location: 34 Lombard Road, Battersea, London, SW11 3RF, United Kingdom
- Coordinates: 51°28′13″N 0°10′40″W

Technical details
- Floor count: 4

Other information
- Number of rooms: 71
- Number of restaurants: 1
- Number of bars: 1

Website
- www.hotelrafayel.com

Rafayel on the Left Bank is a luxury eco hotel at Falcon Wharf, Battersea, London, occupying four floors of a 17 floor building.

== Construction ==
The four-floor eco hotel at Falcon Wharf, Battersea, in the London Borough of Wandsworth, was converted from vacant offices in an early 2000s building and riverside, engineered by George Wimpey and designed by architect James Burland. The 17-storey building is composed of a range of varied height part-blue-clad curved towers culminating in a right-angle end, and is beside the River Thames, 100 metres (330 ft) north of the London Heliport. At 2006 What? House Awards, the Falcon Wharf complex was awarded the "Bronze" prize in the "Best Apartment Category". In 2007, Falcon Wharf was joint winner at the British Home Awards in the category of "Apartment Building of the Year – 2007".

The Rafayal was fitted out and modified by East Anglia Development, according to the designs of Latis Limited, architectural designers. The hotel opened in December 2009.

== Facilities ==
Rafayel on the Left Bank comprises 65 bedrooms, conference facilities (with free use of an overhead projector), a penthouse, spa, gym, moorings, restaurant, brasserie, champagne bar, bakery, and florist. The hotel is insulated from the other uses in the block by including a full plant level between the commercial and residential levels.

== Sustainable development attributes ==
Its planned design was enhanced by owner Iqbal Latif with the intention of creating an environmentally sustainable 5-star hotel, a shuttle service to a Sloane Square tube station and ample cycle parking.

In partnership with companies, such as Philips, the hotel has installed energy-efficient lighting and air-conditioning systems and has eliminated the use of plastics. The hotel claims that these initiatives, when combined with rainwater harvesting, landscaping, and other green systems, will reduce the carbon emission of each hotel room by 75% from the London average.
