= Hotel Riu Plaza London Victoria =

Hotel in Victoria, London

- Interactive map of the Hotel Riu Plaza London Victoria area
- Hotel chain: Riu Plaza

General information
- Location: Victoria, City of Westminster, London, England, 1 Neathouse Place, London SW1V 1LH
- Coordinates: 51.4947°N 0.14199°W
- Opening: 28 July 2023
- Owner: RIU Hotels & Resorts
- Operator: RIU Hotels & Resorts

Technical details
- Floor count: 12

Design and construction
- Architect: Aros Architects (hotel conversion)

Other information
- Number of rooms: 435
- Number of restaurants: 1

Website
- www.riu.com/en/hotel/united-kingdom/london/hotel-riu-plaza-london-victoria

Hotel Riu Plaza London Victoria is a four-star hotel opposite London Victoria station at 1 Neathouse Place, in Victoria, City of Westminster. Opened on 28 July 2023, it was RIU Hotels & Resorts's first hotel in the United Kingdom. Its 435 rooms are spread across 12 floors of a converted 1960s office and retail building.

== History ==
The building was constructed in the 1960s as an office block, with retail and storage space at street level. A flagship Woolworths store occupied the ground floor during part of this period. Its structural frame used post-tensioned concrete, including a transfer girder that allowed part of the building to span Neathouse Place. The building underwent a major refurbishment in the 1990s.

The works included the removal of some internal concrete shear walls, replacement of the façade, and relocation of the main entrance from Vauxhall Bridge Road to Wilton Road, where a circular glazed entrance structure was added. The building continued to be used for offices, with an Argos store occupying part of the premises, until work began to convert it into a hotel. RIU acquired the site in September 2018. The initial proposal was for a 350-room hotel scheduled to open in 2020, with an estimated investment of about €250 million. The project was subsequently delayed, and the hotel opened in July 2023 with 435 rooms.

Aros Architects handled the conversion design, with Evolve Consulting Engineers as structural engineer and McLaren Construction as main contractor, on a £63 million build contract. The finished building was rated "Very Good" under the BREEAM environmental assessment scheme.

== Design and facilities ==
The 1960s concrete frame was largely kept rather than demolished. Its central tower still crosses a roadway on a 20-metre (66 ft) post-tensioned box girder, though three adjoining podium blocks were extended for extra guest rooms and the tower's floor plates widened with lightweight cantilevered sections; both the tower and podium façades were replaced in the process.

The result reads as two buildings in one: a tower rising above a lower podium. What was added as a circular glazed drum in the 1990s refurbishment now serves as the hotel's entrance and lobby. Beyond its 435 rooms and suites, the hotel has a restaurant, a lobby bar, and a fitness centre.
