= 41 Hotel =

Luxury hotel in London

Hotel 41

- Location within Central London

General information
- Location: Buckingham Palace Road, London, England, United Kingdom
- Coordinates: 51°29′54″N 0°8′36.85″W
- Opening: 2000
- Operator: Red Carnation Hotels

41 Hotel or No. 41: A Red Carnation Hotel is a luxury hotel in London, England. It is located just south of Buckingham Palace along 41 Buckingham Palace Road.

== Interior ==
The hotel is located on the top (5th) floor of the building which was once the grand ballroom of The Rubens at the Palace next door to the hotel and opened in 2000. It is the smallest of London's five star hotels with 30 rooms. All of the rooms are furnished in black and white fabrics with traditional mahogany furniture and Egyptian-cotton linens.

== History ==
In 1998 the site of Hotel 41 was bought from the Federation of British Industries in 1998. After two years of renovation, the hotel was opened in 2000.
