= London Paddington station =

Railway terminus in London

Paddington
- London Paddington
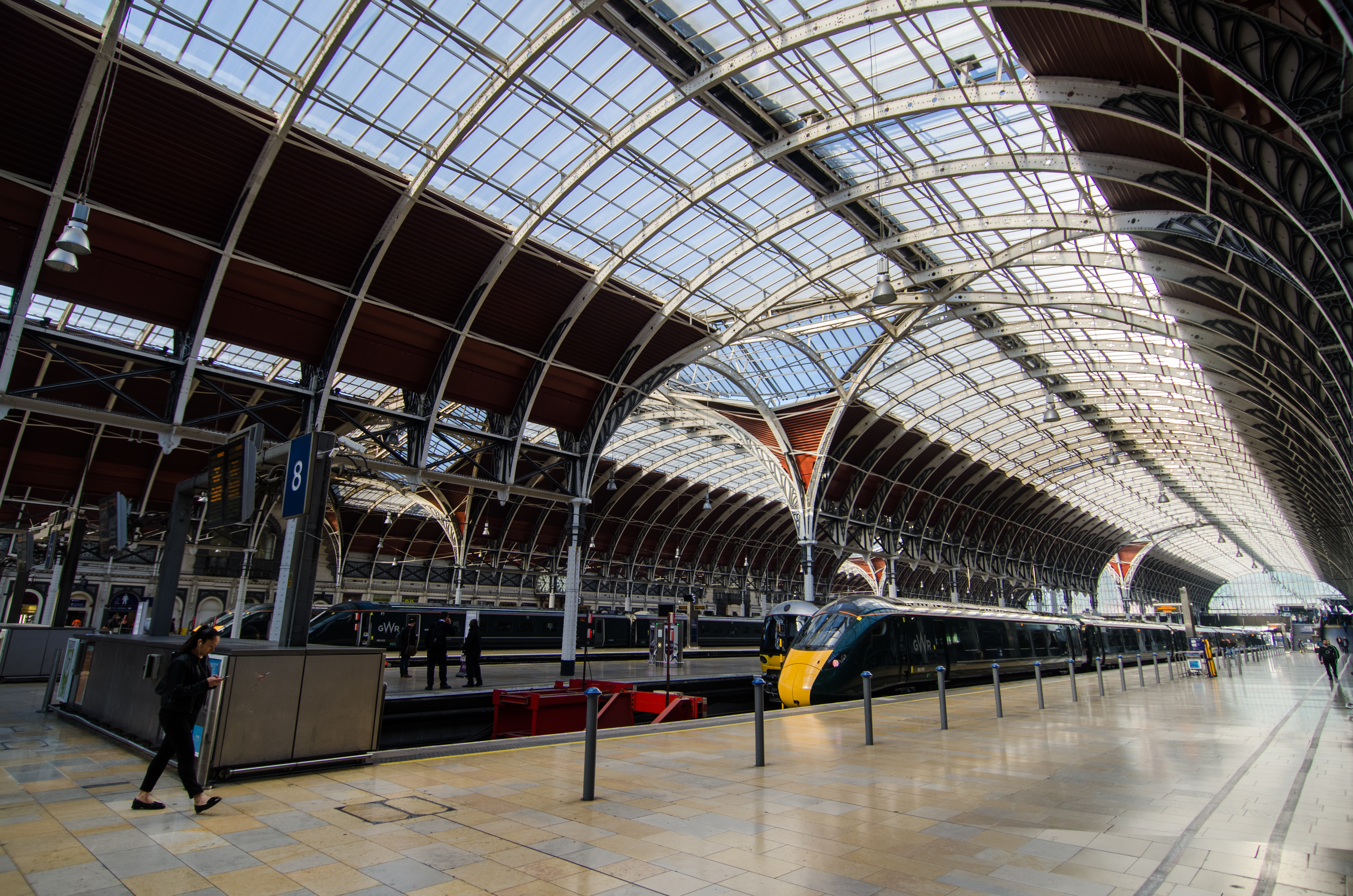
- The Victorian train shed at Paddington in 2018
- Interactive map of Paddington

General information
- Location: Paddington
- Local authority: City of Westminster
- Managed by: Network Rail; London Underground
- Owner: Network Rail
- Station codes: PAD, QQP (IATA)
- DfT category: A
- Number of platforms: 15
- Accessible: Yes
- Fare zone: 1
- OSI: Paddington Bakerloo, Circle and District lines station Paddington Circle and Hammersmith & City lines station Marylebone; Lancaster Gate
- Cycle parking: Yes
- Toilet facilities: Yes

London Underground annual entry and exit
- 2021: ▲20.44 million
- 2022: ▲46.65 million
- 2023: ▲48.55 million
- 2024: ▲54.01 million
- 2025: ▲57.97 million

National Rail annual entry and exit
- 2021–22: ▲23.87 million
- Interchange: ▲2.06 million
- 2022–23: ▲59.183 million
- Interchange: ▲3.708 million
- 2023–24: ▲66.859 million
- 2024–25: ▲69.897 million
- Interchange: ▲3.848 million
- 2025–26: ▲72.920 million
- Interchange: ▲4.176 million

Railway companies
- Original company: Great Western Railway

Key dates
- 4 June 1838: Temporary station opened
- 29 May 1854: Permanent station opened
- 24 May 2022: Elizabeth line opened

Other information
- External links: TfL station info page; Departures; Facilities
- Coordinates: 51.5173°N 0.1774°W

London Paddington is a main line and tube station complex on Praed Street, Paddington, London, which has been the main terminus for the Great Western Railway and successors since 1838. The main line station opened in 1854 and was designed by Isambard Kingdom Brunel. In the year ending March 2026, it was the second busiest station in Great Britain after London Liverpool Street, with an estimated 72.9 million entries and exits.

Paddington is the London terminus of the Great Western Main Line; passenger services are primarily operated by Great Western Railway, which provides commuter and regional passenger services to west London and the Thames Valley region, as well as long-distance intercity services to South West England and South Wales. The station is the eastern terminus for Heathrow Express. Elizabeth line services run through Paddington westwards to Reading, Heathrow Terminal 5, and Heathrow Terminal 4, and eastwards to Abbey Wood and Shenfield. Situated in London fare zone 1, it has two separate London Underground stations: one for the Bakerloo, Circle and District lines; the other for the Circle and Hammersmith & City lines. It is one of 11 London stations managed directly by Network Rail.

The station has been perennially popular for passengers and goods, particularly milk and parcels. Major upgrades took place in the 1870s, the 1910s and the 1960s, each trying to add additional platforms and space while trying to preserve the existing services and architecture as much as possible. Paddington was first served by London Underground trains in 1863, as the original western terminus of the Metropolitan Railway, the world's first underground railway. In the 20th century, suburban and commuter services appeared at Paddington as the urban sprawl of London moved westwards. In the 1990s, the station was refurbished, with platforms electrified as part of the Heathrow Express project and the train shed restored. In the 2010s, Crossrail built a new underground platform to the south west of the main station building, opening as the Elizabeth line in 2022. Despite the numerous upgrades and rebuilding, plus damage sustained in particular during World War II, Brunel's original design is still recognisable.

== Location ==
Station location map. The Paddington (underground) station marked here is the southern station on Praed Street.

The station complex is bounded at the front by Praed Street and at the rear by Bishop's Bridge Road, which crosses the station throat on Bishop's Bridge. On the west side of the station is Eastbourne Terrace, while the east side is bounded by the Paddington arm of the Grand Union Canal. The station is in a shallow cutting, a fact obscured at the front by a hotel building, but which can be clearly seen from the other three sides. To the north of the station is the Westway, to the northeast is Edgware Road, and to the east and southeast is the London Inner Ring Road.

The surrounding area is partly residential, and includes the major St Mary's Hospital, restaurants and hotels. Until recently there was little office accommodation in the area, and most commuters interchanged between National Rail and the London Underground to reach workplaces in the West End or the City. However, recent redevelopment of derelict railway and canal land, marketed as Paddington Waterside, has resulted in new office complexes nearby.

The station is in London fare zone 1. In addition to the Underground stations at Paddington, Lancaster Gate station on the Central line is a short walk away to the south. A little further to the south lie the conjoined parks of Hyde Park and Kensington Gardens.

The Paddington station throat extends as far as Ladbroke Grove.

== History ==
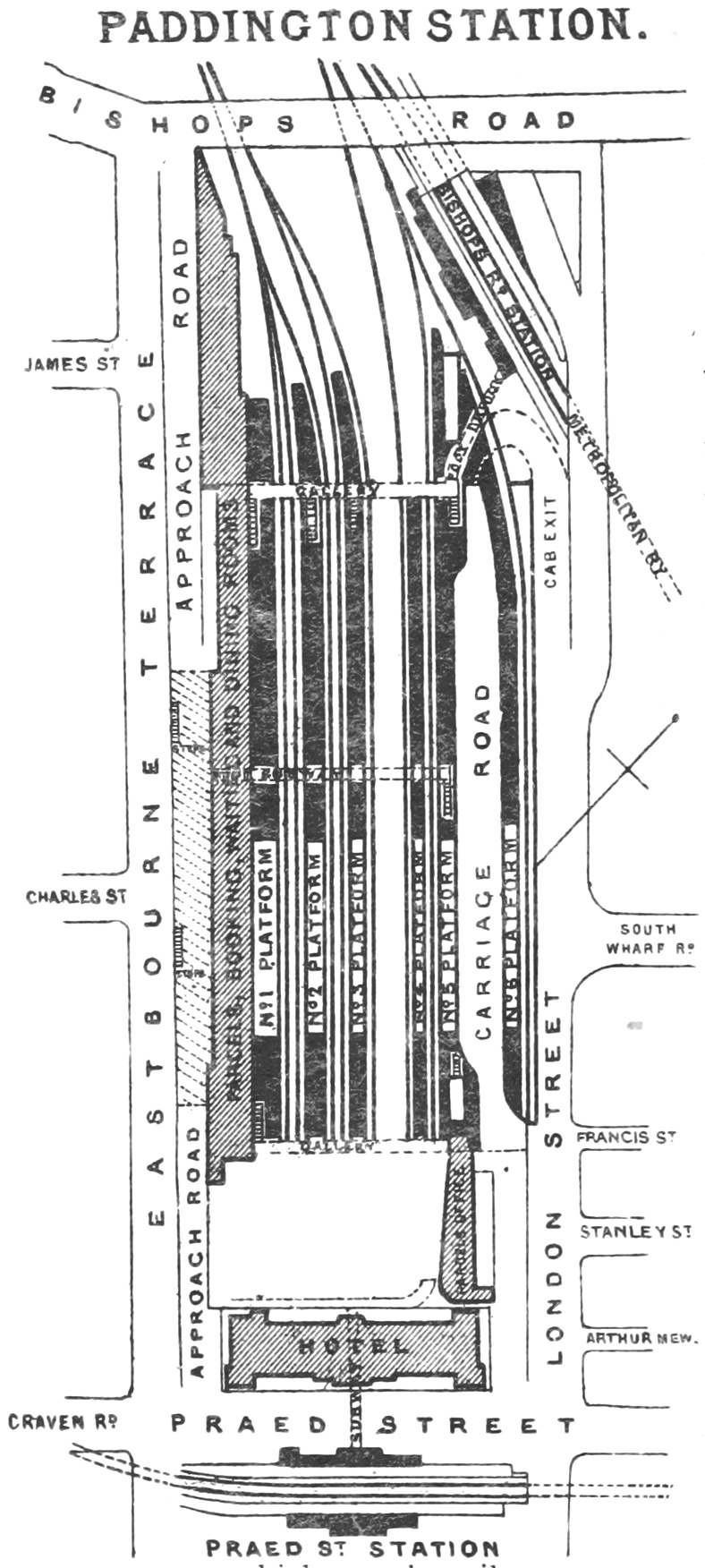
The layout of Paddington Station in 1888

The National Rail station is officially named London Paddington, a name commonly used outside London but rarely by Londoners, who call it just Paddington, as on the London Underground map. This same practice applies to all the London mainline rail termini, except London Bridge. Parts of the station, including the main train shed, date from 1854, when it was built by Isambard Kingdom Brunel as the London terminus for the Great Western Railway (GWR). It is one of eleven stations in London managed by Network Rail.

=== Great Western Railway ===
After several false starts, Brunel announced the construction of a railway from Bristol to London on 30 July 1833. This became the GWR, and he intended it to be the best railway in the country. The GWR had originally planned to terminate London services at Euston as this allowed them to use part of the London and Birmingham Railway's track into the station, which would have been cost effective. This received government approval in 1835, but was rejected as a long-term solution by Brunel as he was concerned it would also allow Liverpool to compete as a port with Bristol if the railway from Birmingham was extended.

The first station was a temporary terminus for the GWR on the west side of Bishop's Bridge Road, opened on 4 June 1838. The first GWR service from London to Taplow, near Maidenhead, ran from Paddington in 1838. After the main station opened, this became the site of the goods depot. Brunel did not consider that anything less than a grand terminus dedicated to the GWR would be acceptable, and consequently this was approved in February 1853.

Paddington Station in the Victorian era

The main station between Bishop's Bridge Road and Praed Street was designed by Brunel, who was enthusiastic at the idea of being able to design a railway station himself, although much of the architectural detailing was by his associate Matthew Digby Wyatt. He took inspiration from Joseph Paxton's Crystal Palace and the München Hauptbahnhof. The glazed roof is supported by wrought iron arches in three spans, respectively spanning 68 feet (21 m), 102 feet (31 m) and 70 feet (21 m). The roof is 699 feet (210 m) long, and the original roof spans had two transepts connecting the three spans.

It is commonly believed that these were provided by Brunel to accommodate traversers to carry coaches between the tracks within the station. However recent research, using early documents and photographs, does not seem to support this belief, and their actual purpose is unknown. The original station used four platforms, 27-foot (8.2 m)-wide and 24-foot-6-inch (7.47 m)-wide departure platforms, a 21-foot (6.4 m) arrival platform, and a 47-foot (14 m) combined arrival platform and cab road. A series of nineteen turnplates were sited beyond the ends of the platforms for horse and coach traffic.

The first GWR service from the new station departed on 16 January 1854, though the roof had not been finished at this point and there were no arrivals. It was formally opened on 29 May, and the older temporary station was demolished the following year.

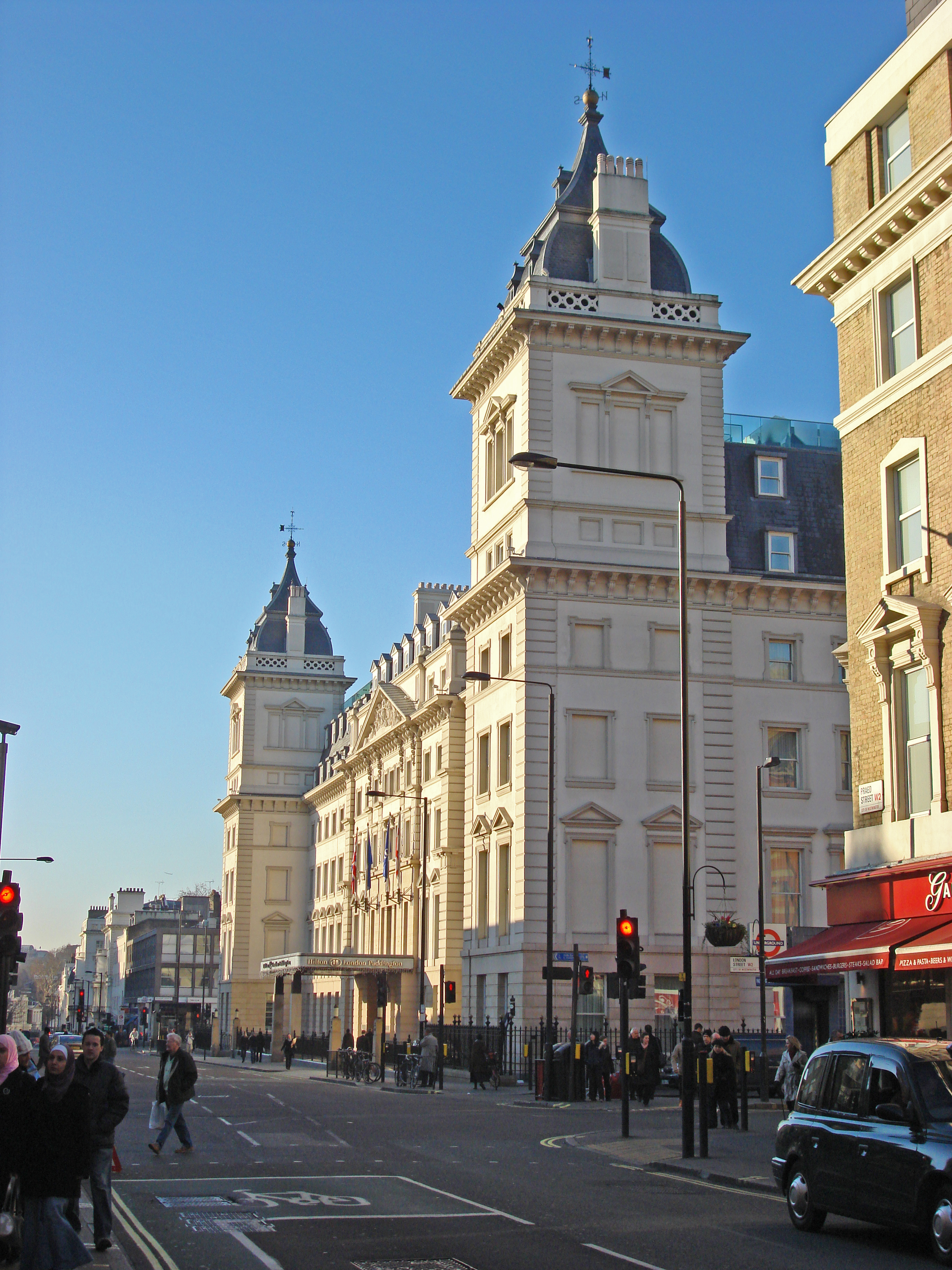
The Praed Street facade of the Great Western Hotel (now the Hilton London Paddington)

The Great Western Hotel was built on Praed Street in front of the station from 1851 to 1854 by architect Philip Charles Hardwick, son of Philip Hardwick (designer of the Euston Arch) in a classical and French-chateau design. It opened on 9 June 1854, and had 103 bedrooms and 15 sitting rooms. Each corner contained a tower containing two additional floors beyond the five storeys of the main block. It was originally run by a consortium of GWR shareholders and staff, before the company took over operations completely in 1896.

The clock on platform 1 was installed in 1903 and has three dials 7 feet 6 inches (2.29 m) in diameter. The station was substantially enlarged in 1906–1915 and a fourth span of 109 feet (33 m) was added on the north side, parallel to the others. The new span was built in a similar style to the original three spans, but the detailing is different and it has no transepts. The area between the rear of the hotel and the concourse is called the Lawn. It was originally unroofed and occupied by sidings, but was later built up to form part of the station's first concourse.

Paddington's capacity was doubled to four tracks in the 1870s. The quadrupling was completed to Westbourne Park on 30 October 1871, Slough in June 1879 and Maidenhead in September 1884. An additional platform (later to become No. 9) opened in June 1878, while two new departure platforms (later Nos. 4 and 5) were added in 1885. One of the lines between what is now platform 5 and 7 was removed, in order that the latter could be moved to a more southerly position. Aside from the June 1878 work, Brunel's original roof structure remained untouched throughout the improvements.

The GWR began experimenting with the electric lighting in 1880, leading to Paddington being decorated with Christmas lights that year. Although the system was unreliable, it spurred the GWR on to a more ambitious lighting scheme in 1886, in which a 145V AC supply could light the terminus, office, goods yard and Royal Oak and Westbourne Park stations. It was praised for its scale and showing that electricity could compete with gas lighting on the same scale.

Paddington became an important milk depot towards the end of the 19th century. A milk dock was built in 1881, and by the 20th century over 3,000 churns were being handled at the station every day. Other goods such as meat, fish, horses and flowers were also transported through Paddington. Passenger traffic continued to improve as well. In March 1906, the goods depot at Westbourne Park was moved to Old Oak Common. The main departure platform was extended in 1908 and used for milk and parcels.

In 1911, work began to separate light and empty carriage traffic from running trains between Paddington to Old Oak Common, which involved the rebuilding of Westbourne Park station. The work was halted because of World War I but resumed in 1926, to be completed the following year. Three new platforms were added; platform 12 in November 1913, platform 11 in December 1915, and platform 10 the following year. The roof was completely reconstructed between 1922 and 1924, replacing Brunel's original cast-iron columns with steel replicas.

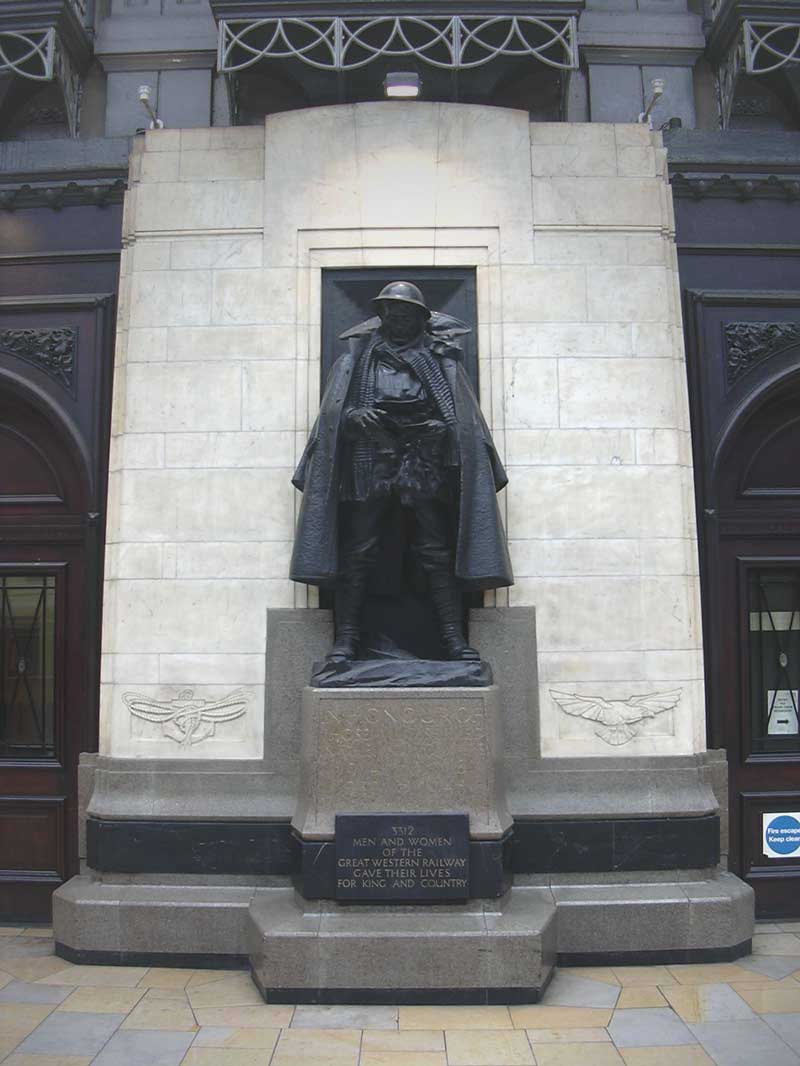
The GWR memorial

Unlike several other London termini, Paddington saw no damage during World War I. Although Victoria and Charing Cross were the main stations for military movement during the war, Paddington was used for some of this traffic.

On Armistice Day 1922, a memorial to the employees of the GWR who died during the war was unveiled by Viscount Churchill. The bronze memorial, depicting a soldier reading a letter, was sculpted by Charles Sargeant Jagger and stands on platform 1.

=== Big Four and British Rail ===
The GWR was the only railway company that continued through the Big Four grouping in 1923. A tube railway for the Post Office, opened in December 1927, could cater for around 10,000 mailbags every day.

Paddington was extended again from 1930 to 1934. Platforms 2 to 11 were extended past the Bishop's Road bridge and a new parcel depot was built. Suburban services, which had never been considered important at Paddington, were increased as new housing estates in the Home Counties started being built. Bishop's Road station was rebuilt, giving an extra four platforms to Paddington (Nos. 13–16) and providing a new ticket office and entrance for suburban services next to the bridge. A public address system was introduced in 1936. By this time, around 22,000 parcels a day were being forwarded from Paddington, with the Royal Mail service processing around 4,500 mailbags and 2,400 parcel bags every day.

The station came under attack several times during World War II. On 17 April 1941, the departure side of the station was hit by a parachute mine, while on 22 March 1944, the roof between platforms 6 and 7 was destroyed by two 500-pound (230 kg) bombs. Passenger traffic greatly increased through Paddington during the war, partly by evacuation to the relatively quiet Thames Valley, and because holidaymakers chose to travel west as large areas of the south and east coasts had been taken over for military purposes. On 29 July 1944, the station was closed for three hours because the platforms were saturated with passenger traffic, while on the subsequent August bank holiday, crowds were controlled in tight queues along Eastbourne Terrace by mounted police.

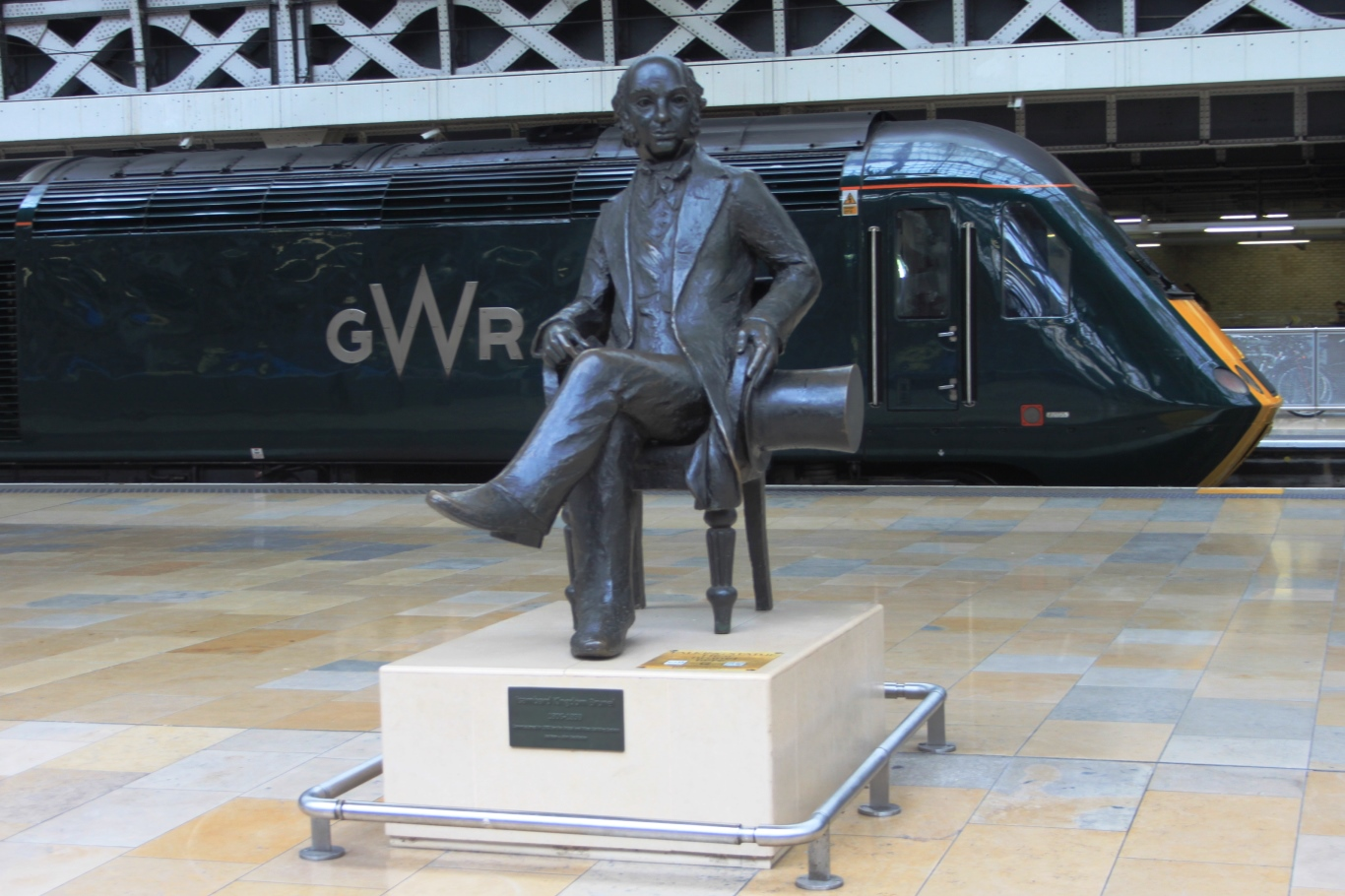
The statue of Isambard Kingdom Brunel

Steam traffic began to be replaced in the late 1950s. Between 1959 and 1961, suburban services switched to diesel multiple units, while the last regular long-distance steam train left Paddington on 11 June 1965. The track layout was reorganised in 1967, abolishing the distinction between arrival and departure platforms that had been a feature of Paddington since opening. A new set of sidings was built south of Royal Oak, and the track curve into Paddington was eased. Services to the Midlands were rerouted via Marylebone during this time.

The station concourse was enlarged in 1970, and the ticket office was rebuilt in the same year. By this time, public opinion had turned against wholesale demolition and redevelopment of stations such as Euston, and consequently the rebuilding work was done with an eye towards preserving Brunel and Wyatt's original station design. Special steam services began to be run from Paddington again in the 1980s.

In 1982, a bronze statue of Brunel was erected on the station concourse. It was sculpted by John Doubleday and funded by the Bristol and West Building Society. Between 1989 and 1999, the Lawn was re-roofed and separated from the concourse by a glass screen wall. It is surrounded by shops and cafes on several levels.

=== Privatisation ===
As with other major British railway termini, Paddington is owned and managed by Network Rail. Train services were privatised in 1996, initially to Great Western Trains and Thames Trains. The former company was renamed First Great Western in 1998, and merged with First Great Western Link and Wessex Trains to form the Greater Western franchise in 2006. In 2015, the operating company was renamed Great Western Railway.

In the mid 1990s, the Great Western Main Line approaches and platforms were electrified as part of the Heathrow Express project. Opening in 1998, the airport rail link connects the station directly to Heathrow Airport. From 1999 until 2003, Express Baggage check-in facilities for airline passengers were provided in the Lawn, however these were progressively replaced by retail units.

The station's fourth span was renovated in 2010, involving repair and restoration of the original glazed roof, so that platforms 9 to 12 can once more enjoy daylight. A false ceiling or crash deck had been in place since 1996. Work was completed and the restored roof unveiled in July 2011. A second phase of improvements began in July 2014 and was completed two years later. Network Rail originally planned to demolish Span 4 and build an office block over it, which was successfully contested by Save Britain's Heritage.

In the mid 2010s, construction began on an underground station as part of the Crossrail project, located south west of the main station building. Coinciding with this project, a new taxi rank and pick up point was built north of the main station, as well as comprehensive upgrades to Paddington tube station. The underground platforms opened as the Elizabeth line on 24 May 2022.

The station had historically been criticised for very poor air quality inside the train shed; however, the replacement of diesel InterCity 125 trains by bi-mode Class 800 and 802 trains in the late 2010s improved air quality.

London Paddington has always been one of the busiest stations in the UK, and was ranked as the 8th busiest station in the United Kingdom during the 2016–17 period according to the Office of Rail & Road, with 36.6 million passengers during that period, and was placed between Stratford and London St Pancras International. However, as a result of the opening of the Elizabeth line, alongside London Liverpool Street, it has become far busier, and London Paddington had become the 2nd busiest station in the United Kingdom during the 2022–23 period, with 59.2 million total passengers, behind London Liverpool Street and ahead of London Waterloo, the former busiest station.

== Services ==
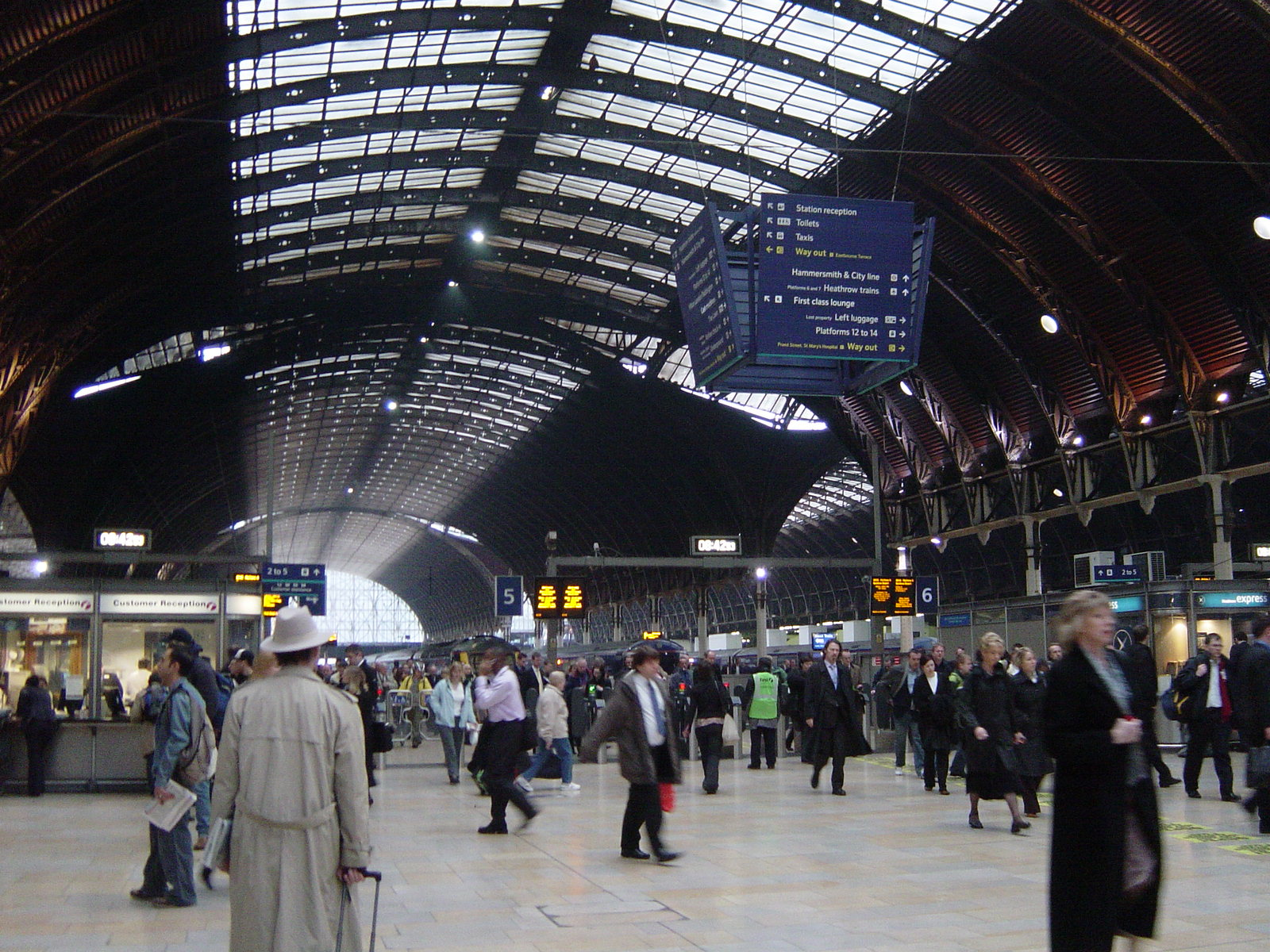
The concourse at rush hour

Paddington is the London terminus for long-distance high-speed trains operated by Great Western Railway. Two services go to Heathrow Airport: the Heathrow Express travels non-stop at a premium fare, while Elizabeth line takes the same route but calls at all intermediate stations.

The station has 13 terminal platforms, numbered 1 to 12 and 14 from south-west to north-east (left to right as seen from the concourse). Platforms 1 to 8 are below the original three spans of Brunel's train shed, platforms 9 to 12 beneath the later fourth span. Platform 13 was decommissioned in December 2016 to permit lengthening of platform 12 for 10-coach trains.

Platform 14 is within the Metropolitan Railway's old Bishop's Road (Suburban) station to the north-west. Immediately alongside are through platforms 15 and 16, used by the London Underground's Hammersmith & City and Circle lines. The current operator, Great Western Railway, assigns numbers to the pocket timetables it publishes, and its services to Bath, Bristol, Weston-super-Mare and South Wales are in timetable number 1.

With the building of the Elizabeth line Paddington gained two more low level platforms numbered A and B. These are located underground in the Elizabeth line section of the station directly to the south west of the main concourse.

The concourse stretches across the heads of platforms 1 to 12, underneath the London end of the four train sheds. Platform 14 can only be reached indirectly via the north-western end of platform 12. A footbridge crosses the north-western end of the station and gives access to platforms 1–12 and 14. There are ticket barriers to platforms 2–7 and 10–14.

A first-class lounge on platform 1 provides complimentary refreshments and Wi-Fi internet access. It also has screens showing television news as well as a departure board.

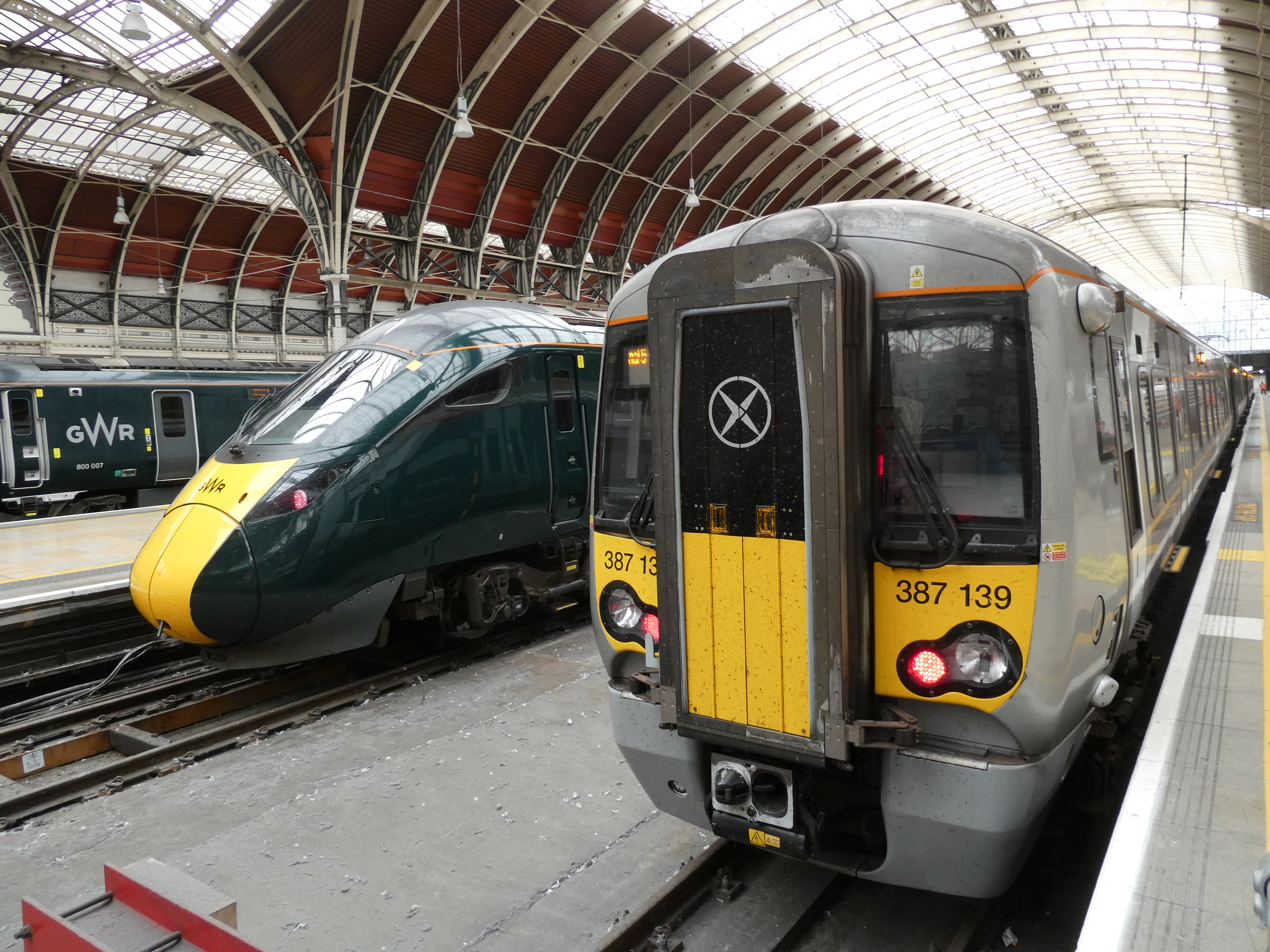
Class 387 Heathrow Express and GWR Intercity Express Train

Platforms 6 and 7 are dedicated to the Heathrow Express. Flight information display screens for airline passengers are provided at the Heathrow Express ticket office near these platforms. An integrated timetable is offered between Paddington and Rosslare Europort in Ireland via the Stena Line ferry from Fishguard Harbour railway station with through ticketing to stations and a daily morning and evening service in both directions, changing at Newport, Cardiff or Swansea. This route has been in existence since 1906.

Paddington is the terminus for suburban trains to West London, Thames Valley, Reading, and Didcot, operated by Great Western Railway.

The general off peak service pattern in trains per hour (tph) is:

Great Western Railway

- 1 tph Newbury
- 2 tph Bristol Temple Meads with 1tp2h continuing to Weston-super-Mare
- 2 tph Cardiff Central with 1 tph carrying on to Swansea
- 1 tph Cheltenham Spa
- 1 tp2h to Exeter St Davids (some services extended to various destinations in the South West)
- 2 tph Oxford with 1 tph carrying on to Great Malvern (some services extended to Hereford)
- 1 tph Plymouth via Exeter St Davids (one every two hours extended to Penzance)
- 2 tph Didcot Parkway (stopping service using the relief lines)

Elizabeth line (operates from underground Elizabeth line platforms, A and B)

- 4 tph Heathrow Terminal 4
- 2 tph Heathrow Terminal 5
- 2 tph Reading
- 2 tph Maidenhead
- 8 tph Abbey Wood
- 8 tph Shenfield

Heathrow Express

- 4 tph Heathrow Terminal 5

Preceding station	National Rail	Following station
Slough	Great Western Railway; Commuter services Great Western Main Line	Terminus
Reading	Great Western Railway; Great Western Main Line	Terminus
Reading	Great Western Railway; Night Riviera	Terminus
Preceding station	Heathrow Express	Following station
Heathrow Terminals 2 & 3 towards Heathrow Terminal 5	Heathrow Express Heathrow Terminal 5–Paddington	Terminus
Preceding station	Elizabeth line	Following station
Acton Main Line towards Heathrow Airport Terminal 4 or Terminal 5	Elizabeth line Abbey Wood–Heathrow	Bond Street towards Abbey Wood
Ealing Broadway towards Reading	Elizabeth line Abbey Wood–Reading	Bond Street towards Abbey Wood
Terminus	Elizabeth line Paddington–Shenfield	Bond Street towards Shenfield
Ealing Broadway towards Heathrow Terminal 5	Elizabeth line Heathrow T5–Shenfield	Bond Street towards Shenfield
Future Services
Bristol Parkway	Lumo; London–Carmarthen	Terminus
Historical railways
Terminus	Great Western Railway; Great Western Main Line	Royal Oak; Line and station open

Until May 2003, Paddington was part of the Virgin CrossCountry network with services to the North of England and Scotland via Oxford and Birmingham New Street. From June 2005 until May 2018, Paddington was the terminus for Heathrow Connect services.

Until December 2018, Chiltern Railways operated a weekday parliamentary service from South Ruislip and to High Wycombe via the Acton–Northolt line. It ceased when the Acton-Northolt line closed. When its London Marylebone terminus was closed, Chiltern Railways diverted its services to London Paddington as did Wrexham & Shropshire between 2008 and 2011.

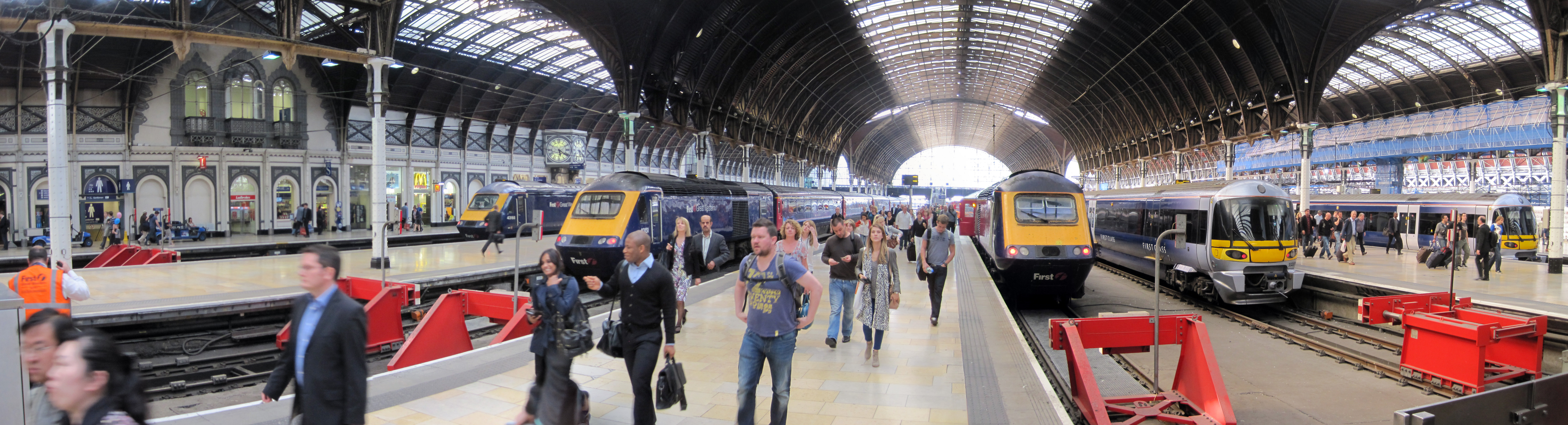
The platforms inside the train shed at London Paddington station. Three of the platforms are occupied by First Great Western High Speed Trains, while another two have Heathrow Express British Rail Class 332 Electric Multiple Units

== Accidents and incidents ==
On 9 August 1920, a passenger train collided with the buffers. Two people were injured. The following year, a passenger train was being shunted into a platform and collided with three luggage vans already occupying the line. A carriage was derailed and a luggage van was wrecked.

On 23 November 1983, a sleeper train hauled by Class 50 locomotive 50 041 Bulwark was derailed on the approach to Paddington after speeding through a crossover. Three of the seventy passengers were injured.

On 18 February 1991, Paddington was bombed by the Provisional IRA, causing bad damage to the station's roof. Three hours later London Victoria station was targeted in a much more serious attack.

The worst accident at Paddington was the Ladbroke Grove rail crash (also called the Paddington rail crash). On 5 October 1999, a Thames Train stopping service from Paddington to Bedwyn passed a red signal and collided with a Great Western express travelling in the opposite direction. The drivers of both trains were killed, along with 29 passengers; 400 others were injured.

On 25 May 2014, the middle coach of an empty stock Class 360 electric multiple unit 360 205 derailed as it entered platform 3, due to maintenance errors.

On 16 June 2016, a Class 165 diesel multiple unit 165 124 passed a signal at danger and derailed in a siding, causing significant disruption to services and damage to infrastructure.

On 13 July 2017, an electrical fire in an intake room led to 2,000 people being evacuated.

On 20 August 2017, a Class 43, 43188 derailed during departure from Platform 2, when forming the rear power car of the 11:57 service to Penzance.

== London Underground stations ==
The GWR was aware that Paddington was some distance from the centre of London, and in 1854 donated £175,000 (£16,774,000 as of 2025) to the North Metropolitan Railway in order that the station could have a link to the City. Consequently, Paddington was the original western terminus of the line when it opened on 1 January 1863. An extension to the Metropolitan Railway provided Paddington with a connection to south of the River Thames, opening from Praed Street Junction via a new station at Paddington, located on Praed Street, to Gloucester Road on 1 October 1868. An extension of the Baker Street and Waterloo Railway to Paddington opened on 1 December 1913, connecting to the Metropolitan Railway's Praed Street station.

Because of the history of the various railways, Paddington is served by four London Underground lines through two separate stations: the Bakerloo, Circle and District lines have a combined sub-surface and deep-level station on Praed Street to the south of the main line station, and the Circle and Hammersmith & City lines have a sub-surface station with access from Paddington Basin to the north. Circle line services run through both of the sub-surface stations as part of a spiral route. Although shown on the London Underground map as a single station, the two stations are not directly linked.

Lancaster Gate Underground station on the Central line and Marylebone mainline station are within walking distance, and out-of-station interchanges to these stations are permitted at no extra cost if made within the permitted time.

Paddington (Praed Street)
Preceding station	London Underground	Following station
Warwick Avenue towards Harrow & Wealdstone	Bakerloo line	Edgware Road Deep tube station towards Elephant & Castle
Bayswater towards Hammersmith via Tower Hill	Circle line	Edgware Road Subsurface station Terminus
Bayswater towards Wimbledon	District line Wimbledon–Edgware Road	Edgware Road Subsurface station Terminus
Paddington (Bishop's Road)
Preceding station	London Underground	Following station
Royal Oak towards Hammersmith	Circle line	Edgware Road Subsurface station towards Edgware Road via Aldgate
Royal Oak towards Hammersmith	Hammersmith & City line	Edgware Road Subsurface station towards Barking

== Elizabeth line station ==
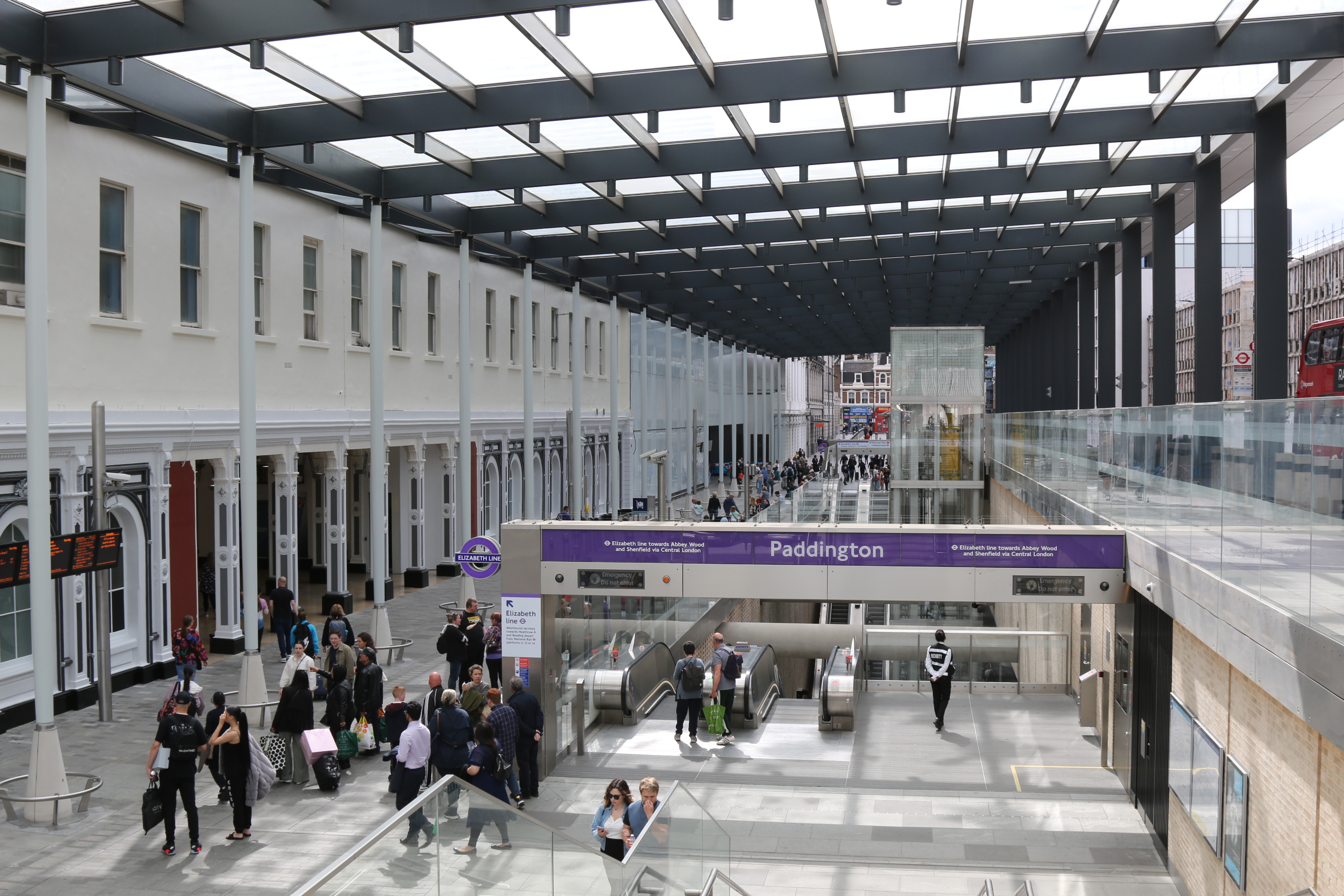
An entrance to the Elizabeth line station, with the canopy above

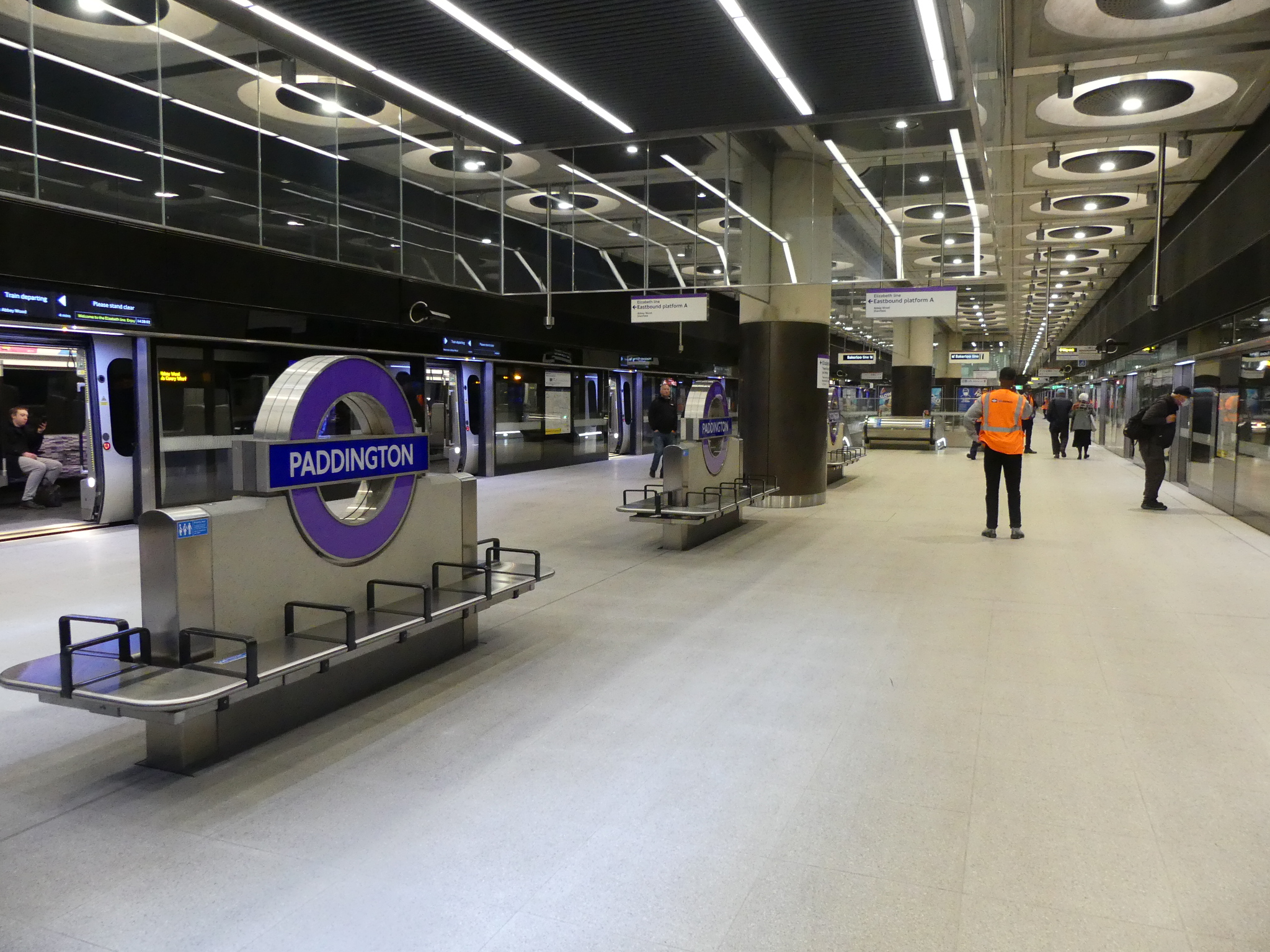
Elizabeth line platforms

As part of the Crossrail project, a new underground station was constructed on the site of the former taxi rank in Departures Road. The platforms opened with the launch of the Elizabeth line on 24 May 2022.

Built using cut and cover construction, the station box is 23 m (75 ft) deep and 260 m (850 ft) long. As part of the construction of the station, the taxi rank was moved to the north side of the station, and Eastbourne Terrace was closed in early 2012 for two years to allow construction of the station box to take place.

The station was designed by Weston Williamson, with a 90 m (300 ft) clear opening into the underground station covered by a 120 m (390 ft) long by 23 m (75 ft) wide glass canopy. Artwork of cloud formations by the artist Spencer Finch has been digitally printed onto the glass canopy. The station was awarded a Civic Trust Award in 2023.

In the 1990s proposals for Crossrail, the station was to be built in the same location on Eastbourne Terrace but would have been designed by the architect Will Alsop with a similar canopy-based design.

Like all Elizabeth line stations, the station has been built to be fully accessible, with lifts and step-free access. An underground passage connects the Bakerloo line station with the Elizabeth line platforms.

Paddington
Preceding station	Elizabeth line	Following station
Ealing Broadway towards Reading	Elizabeth line	Bond Street towards Abbey Wood
Acton Main Line towards Heathrow Terminal 4	Elizabeth line	Bond Street towards Abbey Wood
Terminus	Elizabeth line	Bond Street towards Shenfield
Ealing Broadway towards Heathrow Terminal 5	Elizabeth line	Bond Street towards Shenfield

== Cultural references ==
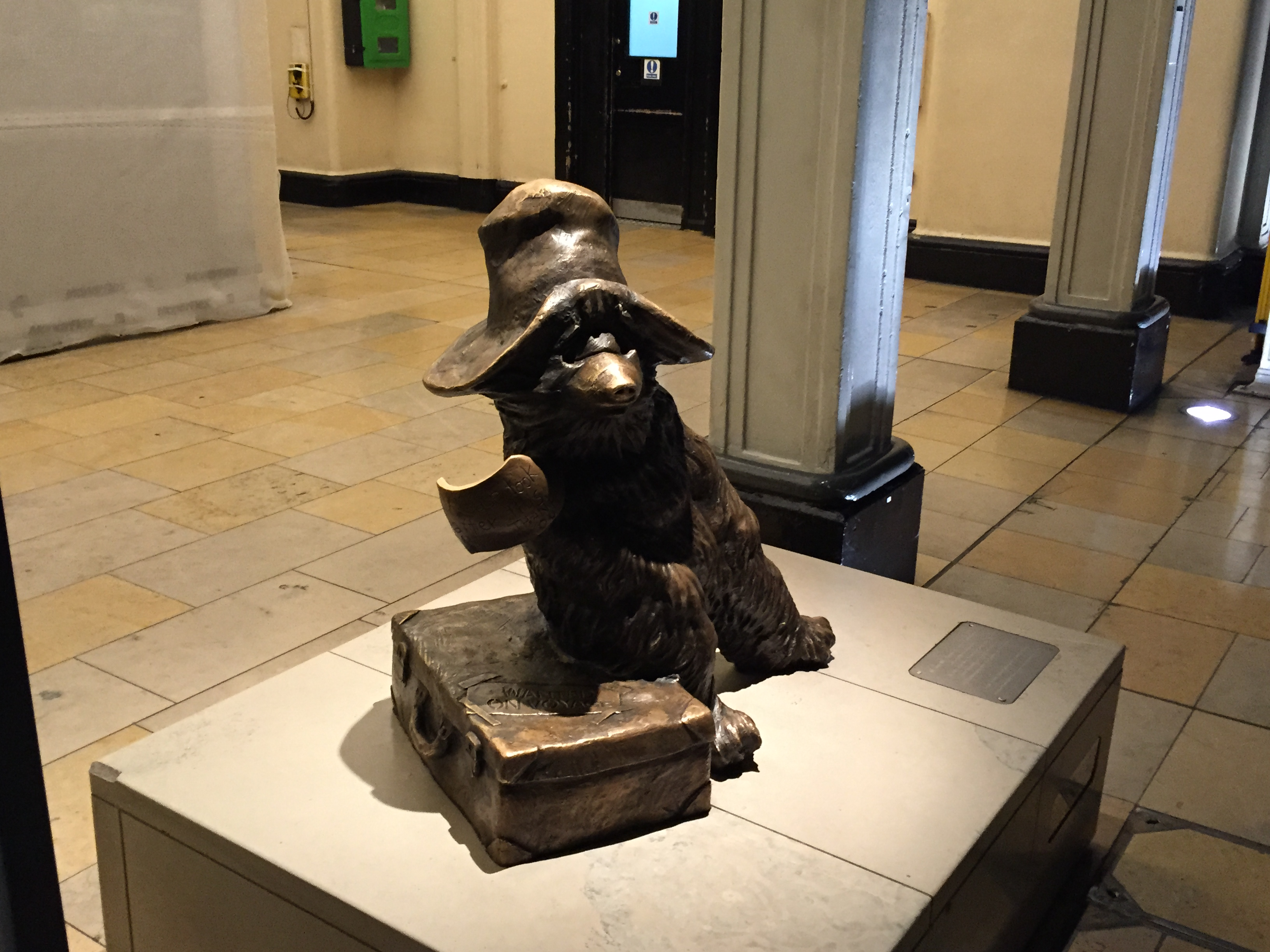
The statue of Paddington Bear

The children's book character Paddington Bear was named after the station. In the books, by Michael Bond, he is found at the station, having come from "deepest, darkest Peru" and with a note attached to his coat reading "please look after this bear, thank you". A statue of him by Marcus Cornish, based on the original drawings by Peggy Fortnum, is located under the clock on platform 1.

Paddington station has been referred to in several popular works of fiction. It is mentioned in several Sherlock Holmes novels. In The Hound of the Baskervilles, Watson and his companions Dr. Mortimer and Sir Henry Baskerville leave for Dartmoor from Paddington, while in The Boscombe Valley Mystery, Holmes and Watson leave the station for a train to Boscombe Valley near Ross-on-Wye, Herefordshire. The mystery novel 4:50 from Paddington (1957) by Agatha Christie begins with a murder witnessed by a passenger on a train from Paddington.

One of The Railway Series books, The Eight Famous Engines, contains a story about Gordon, Duck and a foreign engine debating which station London is. Duck says that he used to work at Paddington so he knows that Paddington is most important. However, Gordon later finds out that the station in London is St Pancras. There is a fictional underground Paddington station on the North London System in the novel The Horn of Mortal Danger (1980).

Paddington station was the subject of William Powell Frith's 1862 painting The Railway Station. The portrait was viewed by over 21,000 people (paying a shilling each) in the first seven weeks of its being publicly shown. The painting is now held in the Royal Holloway College.

The band Supertramp used Paddington station to record the train sounds featured in the song "Rudy" on the 1974 album Crime of the Century. There is a documentary television series about Paddington station on Channel 5 called Paddington Station 24/7.

== Connections ==
The station is served by a large number of day and nighttime London Buses routes.

== Railway band ==
Paddington is home to the Great Western Railway Paddington Band, the last railway band in England. It plays on Friday evenings on the main concourse. In 1997, Railtrack unsuccessfully tried to evict the band, citing a lack of space while the station was redeveloped to accommodate Heathrow Express services.
