= Hilton London Paddington =

Hotel in London, England

Coordinates: 51°30′57″N 0°10′33″W

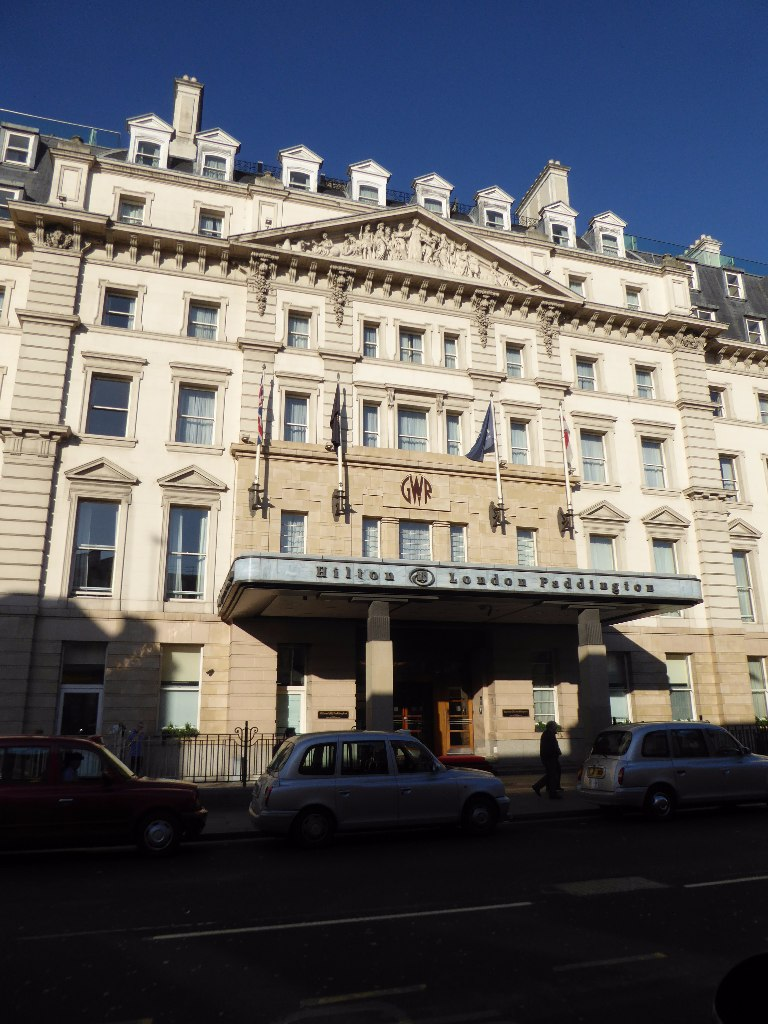
- Interactive map of the Hilton London Paddington area
- Former names: The Great Western Royal Hotel
- Hotel chain: Hilton Hotels & Resorts

General information
- Location: 146 Praed St, London, United Kingdom
- Opened: 9th June 1854
- Owner: Hilton Worldwide

Design and construction
- Architect: Philip Charles Hardwick

Other information
- Number of rooms: 419

Website
- Hilton London Paddington

Listed Building – Grade II
- Official name: Great Western Hotel
- Designated: 01 February 1974
- Reference no.: 1227144

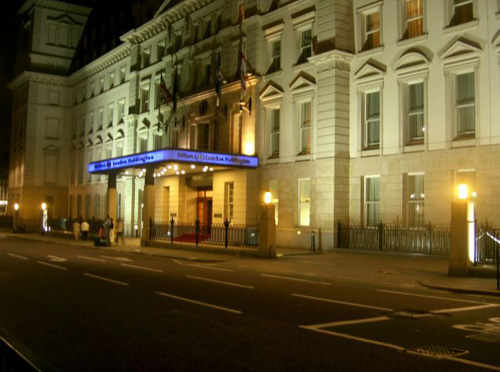
Hilton London Paddington

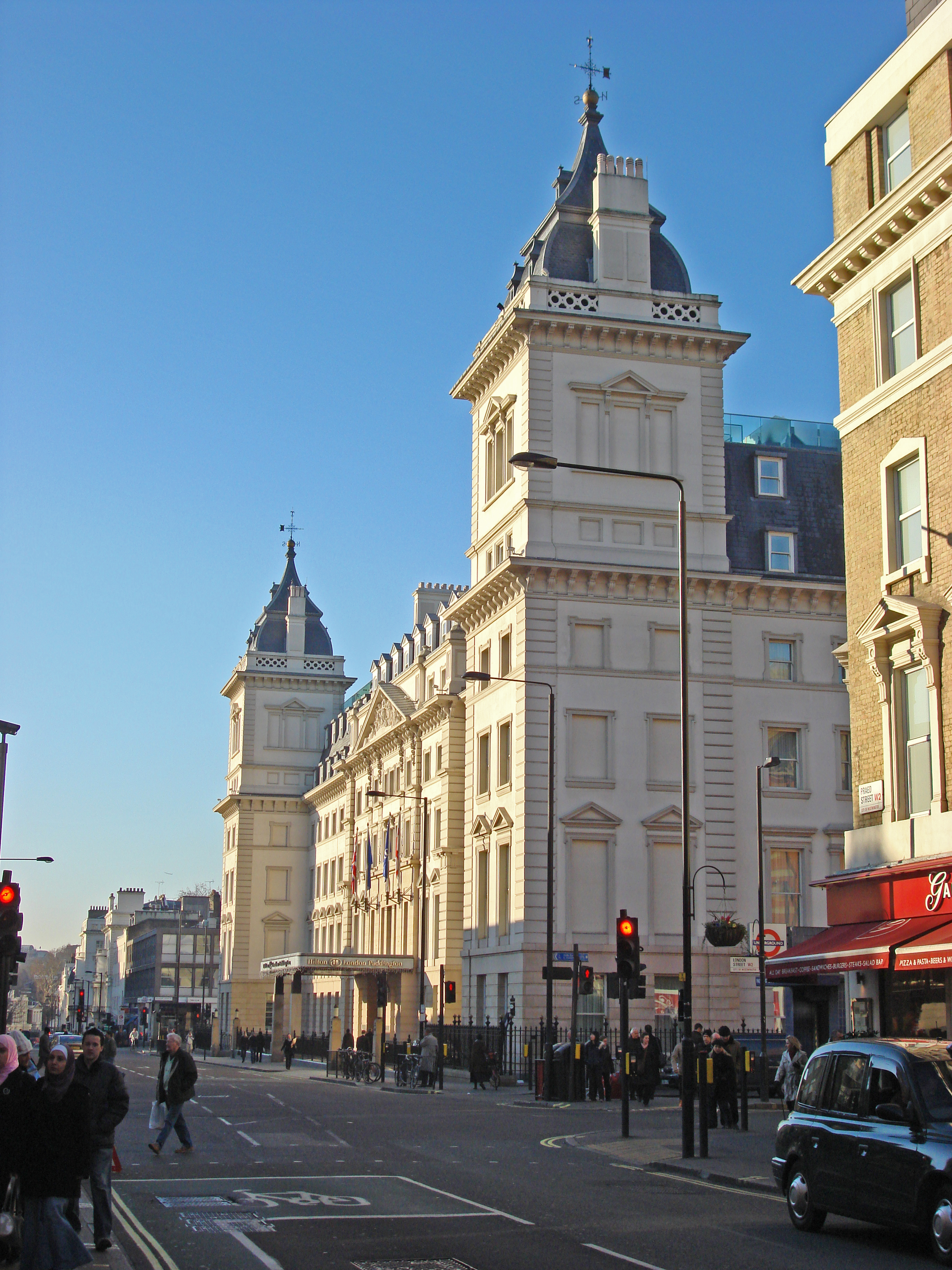
Praed Street frontage

The Hilton London Paddington, formerly the Great Western Royal Hotel, is a hotel that forms part of the Paddington Station complex in London, England. The hotel was originally the idea of Isambard Kingdom Brunel, who was the hotel's first managing director. The funding came in large part from the Directors of the Great Western Railway Company, who were persuaded by Brunel to buy shares in the project. The hotel was built on Praed Street in the early 1850s and opened on 9 June 1854 by Albert, Prince Consort, having taken 14 months to build. The hotel was designed by architect Philip Charles Hardwick, costing approximately £60,000 including all furnishing and fittings - a building which was 'to rival the facilities of the great hotels on the Continent'. The building effectively forms the main façade of the station, closing off the end of the train shed at the head of the terminal platforms. It was built by Messrs Holland Hannen & Cubitts, the building firm founded by Thomas Cubitt.

At Paddington, Hardwick pioneered the Second Empire style for buildings of this type in England. In its original form, the hotel was extensively ornamented inside and outside, and there is a surviving allegorical sculpture in the pediment by John Thomas. The hotel was designed in the style of Louis XIV and further embellished by a figurative sculpture over the front entrance of the hotel representing Peace, Plenty, Science & Industry. Thomas was to contribute many statues and decorations in the present Palace of Westminster.

The Great Western Railway originally leased the hotel to a subsidiary, the Great Western Royal Hotel Company, which was chaired by their engineer Isambard Kingdom Brunel from 1855 until his death in 1859. Brunel's original idea was that a passenger wishing to travel from London to New York would enter the Great Western Royal Hotel and, from that point, be conveyed by and housed in the various undertakings controlled by the Great Western Company. This never came to pass, however, as the Great Western ship was scrapped before the hotel was completed - after the company had tendered for but failed to obtain the prized Atlantic mail contract, losing it to the Cunard Company.

The 2nd Duke of Buckingham and Chandos, whose former seat was Stowe House, died as a bankrupt in the hotel in July 1861. The Duke had formerly served as a Conservative Lord Privy Seal in the early 1840s.

The railway company took full control of its operation in the later nineteenth century, and in the 1930s extended and remodelled it within and without under the direction of their architect Percy Emerson Culverhouse.

Norah, Lady Docker, the notorious socialite and spendthrift of the 1940s and 1950s, died in the hotel on 11 December 1983.

In accordance with Government policies on privatisation of British Rail, it was sold to the private sector in 1983. It was refurbished and reopened under its present name, as part of the Hilton Hotels chain, in 2001.

== See also ==
- Paddington Waterside - the hotel is part of a wider redevelopment of the Paddington area
- Hilton London Metropole - modern convention hotel at the east end of Praed Street
