= Egerton House Hotel =

Hotel in London, England

Coordinates: 51.4968°N 0.1676°W

The Egerton House Hotel
- Interactive map of the The Egerton House Hotel area

General information
- Location: 17-19 Egerton Terrace, Knightsbridge, London, SW3 2BX, England, United Kingdom

Technical details
- Floor count: 4

Other information
- Number of rooms: 28
- Number of suites: 5
- Number of restaurants: 1
- Parking: Street

Website
- egertonhousehotel.com

Egerton House Hotel is an AA five star double-townhouse hotel located at 17-19 Egerton Terrace off Brompton Road in the Knightsbridge area of London. It is part of the Red Carnation Hotels group. The hotel consists of two adjoining Victorian townhouses constructed from red-brick, which were originally built in 1843. It is managed by Michelle Devlin and Annie McCrann. The hotel has 28 en-suite rooms and a number of suites. The hotel is consistently rated within the top 10 best reviewed hotels within London on Tripadvisor.com

== Art ==
The hotel contains a number of original lithographs, by French artist Henri de Toulouse-Lautrec and original works by Picasso and Matisse which belong to the personal collection of the president and founder Mrs. Beatrice Tollman.

== Reception ==
The hotel featured in travel magazine Condé Nast Traveller's annual Gold List of 'best places in the world to stay' in January 2011 and Voted "Most Excellent City Hotel in the UK 2012" by Condenast Johansens
