= London Marriott Hotel County Hall =

Hotel in London

General information
- Location: Westminster Bridge Road, SE1 7PB, London
- Coordinates: 51°30′3.8″N 0°7′9.3″W
- Opened: September 1998
- Operator: Marriott International

Design and construction
- Architect: Ralph Knott

Other information
- Number of rooms: 241

Website
- www.marriott.com/hotels/travel/lonch-london-marriott-hotel-county-hall/

The London Marriott County Hall Hotel is a Grade-II listed hotel at the South Bank in London. It has 241 bedrooms.

== History ==
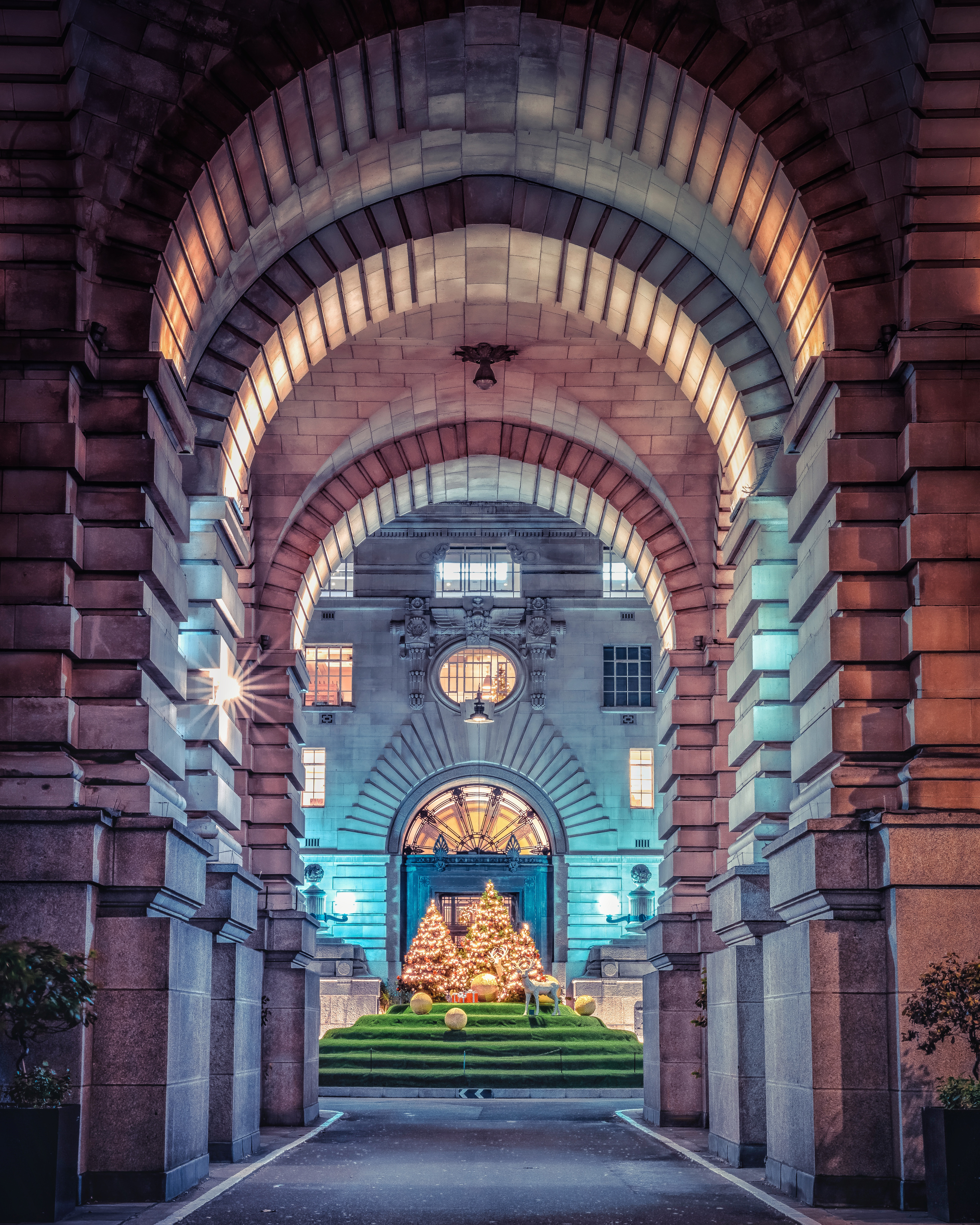
Entrance to London Marriott County Hall during the Holiday Season

The County Hall was designed by Ralph Knott in 1909 and work on the building began in 1912. In 1922 County Hall was officially opened by King George V and Queen Mary as the headquarters of the local government in London. The entire complex of seven buildings was completed in 1932 and the northern section of the building was built in 1933.

The premises continued to expand, and became under control by the Greater London Council (GLC) in 1965. By the 1980s, the Labour controlled GLC was in conflict with the British Conservative Government. Since the Parliament buildings were just across the river from County Hall, the latter sported a large banner recording the total number of unemployed in London. Subsequently, the GLC was abolished by the Prime Minister, Margaret Thatcher in 1986. The London County Council (LCC) was established in 1889 by elected members of each London Borough in order to control public services within each borough. They focused on issues such as education, roads, city planning and council housing. For 64 years, County Hall served as the headquarters for local governments in London.

Following the end of the GLC, the county hall sat vacant. It was purchased by the Shirayama Shokusan Corporation in 1993 and converted into a hotel in 1998.

== Building ==
The building is constructed of Portland Stone from Portland Dorset, and its foundation is a plinth composed of Cornish granite. The oak covered walls are nearly 100 years old and are marked by the English Heritage Foundation. The bronze doors that decorate the entrance were made by Crittals, with enrichments modelled by George Alexander. The plaque on the right side of the entrance commemorates the official opening by King George V in 1922. On the left is displayed a bronze relief of Ralph Knott, designed by Gilbert Bayes and unveiled in 1932. The sculptures of the four pavilions at the far end of County Hall were produced by A. F. Hardman. Visible at the cornice level are eleven coats of arms representing London Boroughs. This was completed in 1933 and overseen by E. Stone Collins after Ralph Knott's death.

The County Hall building is six stories high and has 7 miles (11 km) of corridors.

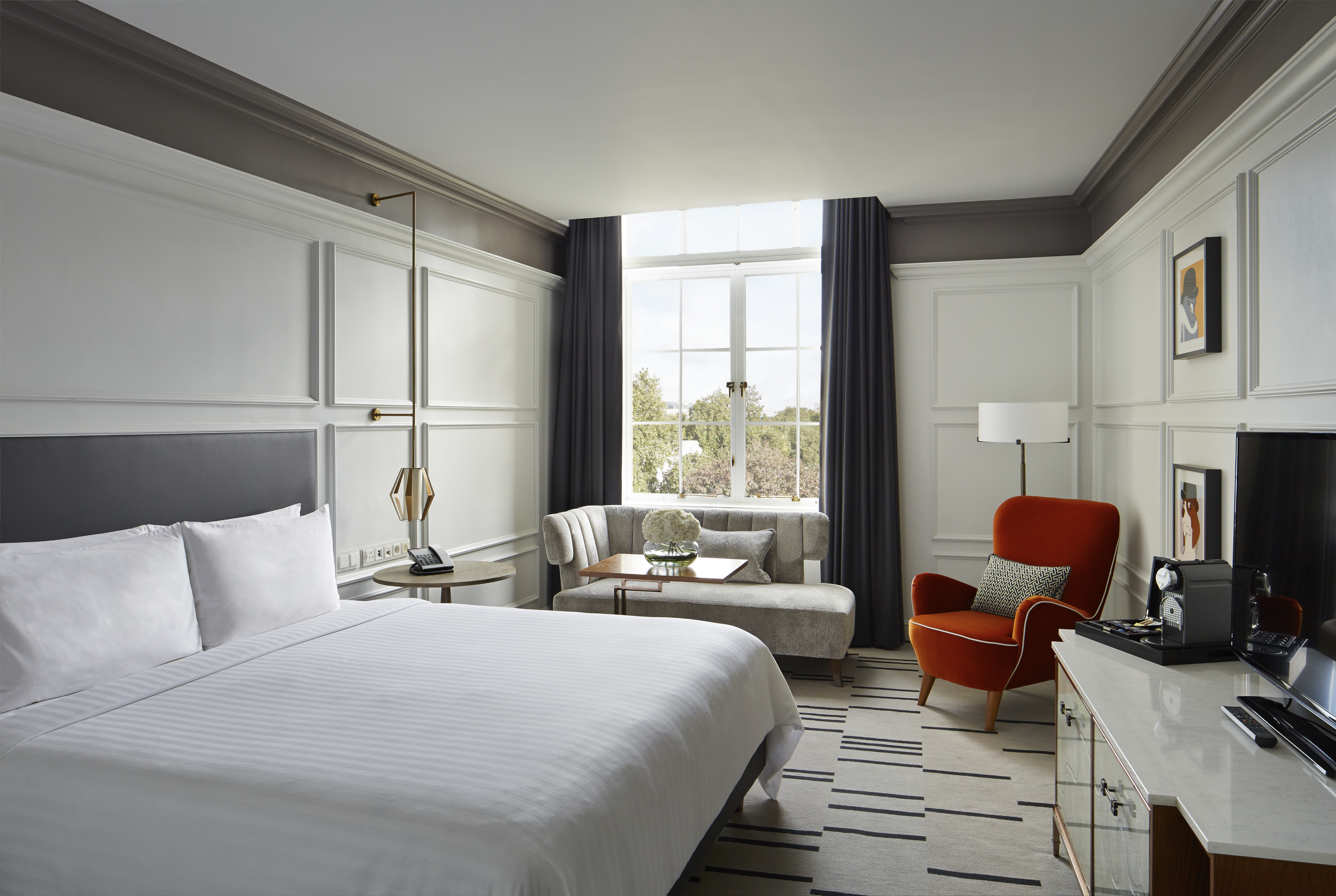
Deluxe Room at the London Marriott County Hall, 2022

== Hotel rooms and designs ==
London Marriott Hotel County Hall was officially opened by Bill Marriott, Chairman and president of Marriott International Inc. on 23 September 1998. The current owner of County Hall is Japanese company, Shirayama Shokusan Ltd.

The hotel currently has 241 bedrooms, 12 meeting rooms, The Library, Gillray's Steakhouse & Bar & the Club at County Hall including a 25m indoor swimming pool located on the 6th floor. All the meeting rooms in the hotel have been created from offices dating back to 1922.
