= The Montcalm =

Hotel group in London

Montcalm Collection
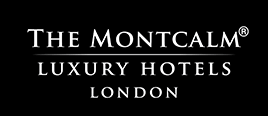

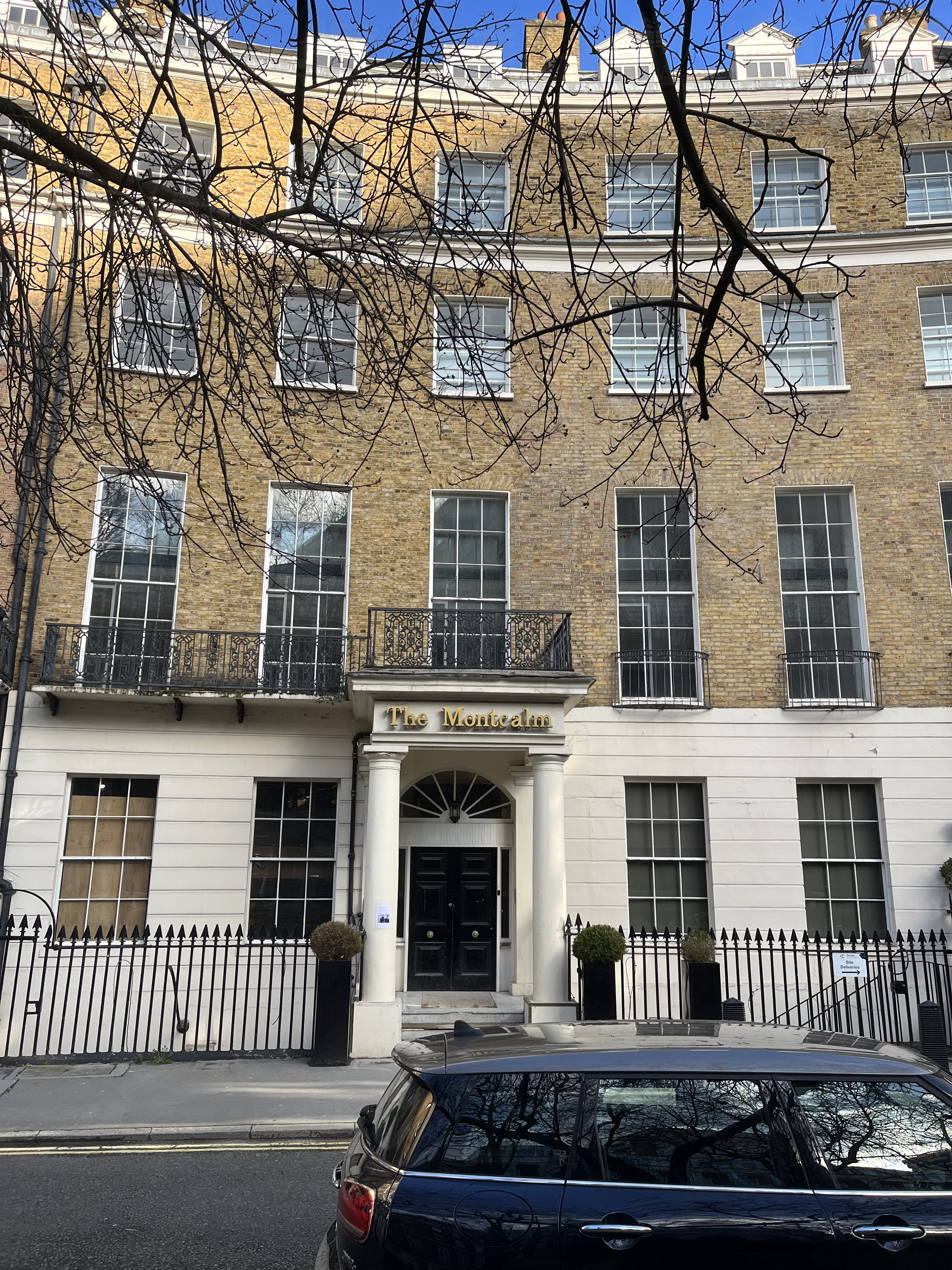
- Montcalm Mayfair

Website
- Official website

Montcalm Collection is a diverse portfolio of luxury and boutique hotels in London, United Kingdom.

The hotel group comprises 15 hotels. These include Montcalm Mayfair, Montcalm East, and Montcalm Royal London House, all of which are affiliated with Marriott International’s Autograph Collection. The portfolio also includes the Montcalm Brewery. In addition, the Collection encompasses the Inhabit hotels, which hold B Corp certification and focus on wellness-led hospitality, as well as the Montcalm Townhouses and Park Grand hotels.

The collection spans five‑star and upscale four‑star properties.

== History ==
Montcalm Mayfair is the flagship hotel of the Montcalm Collection and forms part of Marriott’s Autograph Collection.

The building dates from the early 1970s when Piccadilly Estate Hotels Ltd. built it at 2 Wallenberg Place. It opened in 1973 and was originally called The Montcalm, named after the Marquis de Montcalm, the commander of the French forces defeated by the British in the struggle for possession of Canada in 1759. The link between this battle and the building is the Canadian province of Quebec, which had already lent its name to the original mews (Quebec Mews) at the rear of the building. However, the site's history dates back much farther, as suggested by the hotel's crescent-shaped Georgian façade, which, in agreeing to the hotel's construction, Westminster Council insisted should remain.

The façade originally belonged to the building erected as houses at 2 Wallenberg Place on plots leased from the Portman family in 1789. It is likely that each house had four stories (including an attic), each over a basement three bays wide. All the houses came with stabling in Quebec Mews, accessed from New Quebec Street. During the nineteenth century, exterior alterations were made to the houses, including the conversion to cottages of the buildings in Quebec Mews.

Both Wallenberg Place and Quebec Mews are located within Westminster's Portman Square (designated as a conservation area in 1967). The area, part of the parish of St Marylebone, was covered with trees and marshland as part of the forest of Middlesex until, in 1532, Sir William Portman leased the 270 acres (109 ha) that surrounded it. In 1554 the freehold was conveyed in perpetuity to Sir William and his heirs and, three years later in 1757, when Marylebone Road was sited to provide a route to the City bypassing the West End (the New Road), the grid of streets that is now recognizable as the Portman Estate was laid out. Shortly afterwards in 1764, construction of Portman Square and neighbouring streets began; the development was completed in 1820.

== Hotels ==
=== Montcalm Mayfair ===
The Montcalm Marble Arch was acquired by Shaftesbury Hotels in 2008 and, following a £38 million refurbishment program, reopened in September 2010. It was previously owned by Nikko Hotels (part of the JAL Group).

The hotel reopened on 1 April 2025 as Montcalm Mayfair, following a two-year redevelopment led by architectural practice Holland Harvey, with interior design by Studio Est and Studio Mica. The refurbishment sought to balance the building’s Georgian heritage with contemporary design, sustainability principles, and a focus on wellbeing.

Located in Wallenberg Place, near Park Lane and Oxford Street, this hotel has 150 rooms including three suites: the Botanical Suite, a private suite; the Presidential Suite, inspired by the historical salons of Elizabeth Montagu; and the Royal Suite, which contains a collection of lithographs and contemporary artworks. The hotel includes a restaurant, Lilli by Akira Back, and offers an afternoon tea service titled Into the Garden. The property also features the YĀTRĀ Spa, which offers wellness treatments informed by Ayurvedic traditions. Event facilities include a 400-m² pillarless ballroom, as well as The Library and the Bloom private dining room.

In October 2015, the hotel became the first in the Montcalm chain to have a 10-Gb Ethernet wide area network (WAN) and Internet connection delivered by Internet service provider Exponential-e Ltd.

On 30 October 2015, the World Boutique Hotel Awards (WBHA) ceremony was held at The Montcalm.

=== Montcalm Royal London House ===
Montcalm Royal London House Hotel has 253 bedrooms and occupies part of a mid-century office building at 22–25 Finsbury Square in the City of London. The building was originally used as offices and was adapted for hotel use, with the hotel opening in October 2016. It was developed by Montcalm Luxury Hotels in a retrofit and extension scheme that transformed the former office structure into a hotel property with guest accommodation and hospitality facilities.

=== Montcalm East ===
Montcalm East, an Autograph Collection Hotel, is located in East London, close to the Old Street area and Shoreditch. The property is an 18-storey building with 288 guest rooms. Hotel facilities include a restaurant and bars, a spa with a swimming pool and treatment rooms, a gym, and dedicated meeting and event space with capacity for up to 250 guests.

=== The Montcalm Brewery ===
Formerly the site of Whitbread & Co., Britain's first purpose-built mass production brewery, The Montcalm Brewery's building is listed and dates back to 1750 when Samuel Whitbread moved his brewing operations to Chiswell Street on the 'eastern rim of Georgian London', now Barbican. The last beer was brewed on the site in 1976, after which it became Whitbread Plc's Head Office and then The Brewery, a conference and banqueting venue.

The hotel contains a gourmet gastropub (The Jugged Hare), a restaurant (Chiswell Street Dining Rooms) and business conference facilities.

=== Inhabit Hotels ===
Inhabit Hotels is a wellness-focused hotel brand operated by The Montcalm Collection. The brand comprises two properties in West London: Inhabit, Southwick Street in Paddington and Inhabit, Queen’s Gardens in Bayswater. Both hotels occupy restored Georgian and Victorian townhouses.

In 2022, The Montcalm Collection became B Corporation (B Corp) certified, with the certification covering both Inhabit properties.

=== Montcalm Brewery Townhouse ===
Occupying a Grade II listed building opposite its sister hotel (Montcalm Brewery), London City Suites shares the amenities of the latter site.

=== Townhouses ===
In addition to Montcalm Brewery Townhouse, the Montcalm Collection operates several townhouse-style hotels in central London, including Montcalm Chilworth Townhouse, Montcalm Piccadilly Townhouse, and Montcalm Mayfair Townhouse. These hotels occupy converted historic townhouses and operate on a smaller scale than the group’s larger hotel properties.

=== Grand Royale Hyde Park ===
Grand Royale Hyde Park is a historic hotel located on Inverness Terrace, overlooking Hyde Park in central London. Housed in a late Victorian building, the hotel reflects the architectural character of the area and has long been associated with the cultural and social history of Bayswater.

The building has been associated with local theatrical folklore. According to a long-standing tradition, a private theatre was once created in the hotel for the actress and socialite Lillie Langtry during the period of her relationship with the Prince of Wales (later King Edward VII).

In 2003, the property was the location chosen for a music video by Amy Winehouse for the song In My Bed.

=== Park Grand Hotels ===
In addition to the Grand Royale Hyde Park, the Montcalm Collection operates several hotels under the Park Grand name in London, including Park Grand Hyde Park, Park Grand Mayfair, and Park Grand Heathrow. These properties operate primarily as full-service hotels and are generally larger in scale than the group’s townhouse hotels. They are located across central and west London, as well as near Heathrow Airport.
