= Corona =

Corona (from the Latin for 'crown') most commonly refers to:

- Stellar corona, the outer atmosphere of a star
  - Solar corona, the outer atmosphere of the Sun
- Corona (beer), a Mexican beer
- Corona, informal term for the coronavirus or disease responsible for the COVID-19 pandemic:
  - SARS-CoV-2, severe acute respiratory syndrome coronavirus 2
  - COVID-19, coronavirus disease 2019

Corona may also refer to:

== Architecture ==
- Corona, a part of a cornice
- The Corona, Canterbury Cathedral, the east end of Canterbury Cathedral

== Businesses and brands ==
=== Food and drink ===
- Corona (beer), a Mexican beer brand
- Corona (restaurant), in the Netherlands
- Corona (soft drink), a former brand

=== Technology ===
- Corona (software), a mobile app creation tool
- Corona Data Systems, 1980s microcomputer supplier
- Corona Labs Inc., an American software company
- Corona Typewriter Company, merged into Smith Corona in 1926
- Corona, a version of Microsoft's Xbox 360
- Chaos Corona, rendering software

== Entertainment, arts and media ==
=== Fictional entities ===
- Corona (fictional world), in R. A. Salvatore's DemonWars novels
- Corona, a character in the game Doraemon: Nobita to Mittsu no Seireiseki
- Corona, a character in the anime series Funny Pets
- Corona, a character in the Spider Riders novels
- Corona, a fictional kingdom in the animated film Tangled
- Corona Mountain, the last level in Super Mario Sunshine
- Corona-chan, a moe anthropomorphization of COVID-19 and an internet meme
- Coronamon, a character in the anime series Digimon Fusion

=== Film ===
- Corona (film), a 2020 Canadian thriller drama
- La Corona (film), a 2008 American short film
- Corona Zombies, a 2020 American comedy horror film
- 1-2-3 Corona, a 1948 East German film

=== Games ===
- Corona (solitaire), a card game

=== Literature ===
- Crown of sonnets, a type of sonnet sequence
- Corona (novel), a Star Trek novel by Greg Bear
- "Corona", a poem by Paul Celan
- "Corona", a short story by Samuel R. Delany

=== Music ===
- Corona (band), an Italian music group
- Corona, people at a cantus (Dutch drinking and singing party)
- The Coronas, an Irish rock band
- "Corona" (song), by The Minutemen
- Corona (Takemitsu), by Japanese composer Toru Takemitsu
- Corona II, another composition by Takemitsu
- Corona, the circle of clergy or singers who surround the altar, and origin of the term choir
- La corona (Gluck), an opera
- Corona Capital, music festival

== People ==
- Corona (surname) (including a list of people with the name)
- Saint Corona, 2nd-century Christian saint
- Corona (footballer) (born 1981), Spanish footballer
- Corona Rintawan (born 1975), Indonesian physician
- Corona Schröter (1751–1802), German musician, singer and composer

== Places ==
=== United States ===
- Corona, Alabama, an unincorporated community
- Corona, California, a city
- Corona, Minnesota, an unincorporated community
- Corona, Missouri, an unincorporated community
- Corona, New Mexico, a village
- Corona, Queens, New York City, New York, a neighborhood
- Corona, South Dakota, a town
- Corona, Tennessee, an unincorporated community

=== Elsewhere ===
- Corona Lodge, Berea, Gauteng, South Africa
- Corona Station (pastoral lease), New South Wales, Australia
- Corona Theatre School, in London, England
- Estadio Corona, a stadium in Mexico
- La Corona, an ancient Mayan city in Guatemala
- Brașov, Romania (Medieval Latin name Corona), a city
- Corona, Cuba, a hamlet

== Science ==
=== Astronomy and space ===
- Stellar corona, the outer atmosphere of a star
  - Solar corona, the outer atmosphere of the Sun
- Corona Borealis, the Northern Crown constellation
- Corona Australis, the Southern Crown constellation
- Corona (optical phenomenon), coloured rings around Sun or Moon
- Corona (planetary geology)
- CORONA (rocket), a Russian prototype
- CORONA (satellite), a 1959–1972 US satellite series
- CORONAS programme, a Russian Solar observation programme

=== Biology ===
- Coronavirus, a group of RNA viruses
  - Severe acute respiratory syndrome coronavirus 2 (SARS-CoV-2), a coronavirus responsible for the 2020–2023 pandemic
    - Coronavirus disease 2019 (COVID-19), the disease caused by the virus
    - COVID-19 pandemic, the 2020-2023 global pandemic
- Corona (gastropod), a genus of large tropical land snails
- Corona (perianth), in the corolla of some flowering plants
- Corona, anterior lobes of a rotifer
- Corona of glans penis
- Corona ciliaris, a part of the human eye

=== Mathematics ===
- Corona theorem (or conjecture) in complex analysis
- Corona algebra (or corona) of a C*-algebra
- Corona graph product, a kind of binary operation on two graphs
- Corona set (or corona), of a topological space

=== Physics ===
- Corona (fluid dynamics), the last phase of a drop's impact on a liquid surface
- Corona discharge or corona effect, an electrical discharge around a conductor
- Corona poling, treatment of a material to enhance electro-optic properties

== Transportation ==
=== Automobiles ===
- Toyota Corona, a 1957–2001 Japanese compact car

=== Rail ===
- Corona station (Edmonton), a light rail station in Edmonton, Alberta, Canada
- Corona station (LIRR), a former railroad station in New York City, New York, US
- IRT Flushing Line, a New York City Subway line, formerly called the Corona Line

=== Watercraft ===
- French frigate Corona (1807)
- MS Svea Corona, a former car–passenger ferry
- SS Corona, a Finnish cargo ship 1922−1960
- USS Corona (SP-813), a yacht used by the US Navy in WWI

== Other uses ==
- Corona (typeface), a font
- Operation Corona, a British WWII operation
- Corona, a type of cigar
- Austro-Hungarian krone, the latinised name of the Austro-Hungarian krone currency, as used in German-speaking parts of the empire and on coins

== See also ==
- Carona (disambiguation)
- Coroana (disambiguation)
- Corona Line (disambiguation)
- Korona (disambiguation)
- Koruna (disambiguation)
- Krona (disambiguation)
- Crown (disambiguation)
