= Corona (surname) =

Corona is a surname. Notable people with the surname include:

- Achille Corona (1914–1979), Italian socialist politician, lawyer and journalist
- Adriana Corona (born 1980), Mexican triathlete and gold medalist
- Alberto Amaro Corona (born 1963), Mexican politician from the Party of the Democratic Revolution
- Alejandro Corona (born 1976), former Mexican professional footballer
- Alessandro Corona (born 1972), Italian rower
- Alfonso Corona Blake (1919–1999), Mexican film director and screenwriter
- Antonio Vega Corona (born 1965), Mexican politician affiliated with the National Action Party
- Bert Corona (1918–2001), United States labor and civil rights leader
- Cayetano Corona Gaspariano, Mexican potter and Grand Master of Mexican Popular Arts
- David Barron Corona (1963–1987), Mexican criminal
- Eduardo José Corona (1925–2008), Portuguese footballer
- Fabrizio Corona (born 1974), Italian photographer, media personality and actor
- Fernando Corona (born 1970), Mexican electronica artist known as "Murcof"
- Heriberto Jara Corona (1879–1968), Mexican revolutionary and politician
- Isabela Corona (1913–1993), Mexican actress
- Javier Corona (1927–2003), Mexican–American diplomat and restaurateur
- Jesús García Corona (1881–1907), Mexican railroad brakeman died while preventing a dynamite train explosion
- Jesús Manuel Corona (born 1993), Mexican football winger
- Joe Corona (born 1990), United States professional soccer player
- Jose Corona Nuñez (1906–2002), Mexican author, anthropologist and history professor
- José de Jesús Corona (born 1981), Mexican footballer
- José Llopis Corona (1918–2011), Spanish footballer
- Juan Corona (1934–2019), Mexican-American serial killer
- Kenedy Corona (born 2000), Venezuelan baseball player
- Leonardo Corona (1561–1605), Italian Renaissance painter
- Leandro Coronas Ávila (born 1971), Brazilian former professional footballer
- Leticia Gutiérrez Corona (born 1951), Mexican politician affiliated with the New Alliance Party
- Livia Corona Benjamin (born 1975), Mexican artist
- Luis Rodolfo Abinader Corona (born 1967), current president of the Dominican Republic
- Manuel Corona (1880–1950), Cuban musician
- Manuel Gerardo Corona (born 1983), former Mexican-German footballer
- María Corona Nakamura (born 1964), Mexican politician affiliated with the PRI
- Mauro Corona (born 1950), Italian writer
- Pio Alberto del Corona (1837–1912), Roman Catholic Italian prelate and the founder of the Suore Domenicane dello Spirito Santo
- Puccio Corona (1942–2013), Italian journalist and television presenter
- Ramón Corona (1837–1889), Mexican general and diplomat
- Renato Corona (1948–2016), former Chief Justice of the Supreme Court of the Philippines
- Rene Corona (born 1984), United States soccer player
- Salvador Corona (1895–1990), Mexican–American bullfighter and artist
- Sebastián Corona (born 1976), retired Spanish footballer
- Theodor Corona Musachi (or Teodor III Muzaka; died 1449), Albanian nobleman
- Vittorio Corona (1948–2007), Italian journalist
- Yasser Corona (born 1987), Mexican footballer

== See also ==
- Corona (disambiguation)
