= Krone =

Krone (the cognate of Crown) may refer to:

== General ==
- Crown
- ADC KRONE & The KRONE Group in ADC Telecommunications
- KRONE LSA-PLUS, a popular telecommunications connector, or krone tool
- Krone an der Brahe, the German name for Koronowo, Poland
- Diu Crône, a medieval poem
- Kronen Zeitung, an Austrian tabloid
- The Krone Group, manufacturer
- Krone (mountain), in the Alps
- Bernard Krone Holding, a German company

== Name ==
- Fred Krone (1930–2010), American actor and stuntman
- Heinrich Krone (1895–1989), German politician
- Julie Krone, American jockey
- Sigismund Ernst Richard Krone (1861–1917), German naturalist
- Hermann Krone (1827–1916), German photographer
- Roger Krone, CEO of Leidos

== Currency ==
- Named by European monarchies:
  - Scandinavia:
    - Danish krone
      - Krone (Danish coin)
    - Norwegian krone
    - Swedish krona
  - Austro-Hungarian krone
  - Faroese króna
  - Fiume krone
  - Yugoslav krone
- Named by republics:
  - Czech koruna
  - Estonian kroon
  - Icelandic króna
  - Slovak koruna

== See also ==
- Krona (disambiguation)
- Koruna (disambiguation)
- Crown (British coin)
- Crown (currency)
- Crone, a stock character in folklore and fairy tale, an old woman
- Lower Croan, a farmstead in Cornwall, England, UK
- Crohn's disease, a type of inflammatory bowel disease
