= ANSCA =

ANSCA or Ansca may refer to:

- Alaska Native Claims Settlement Act, American legislation
- Corona Labs Inc., formerly Ansca Mobile, an American software company
