= Mega trailer =

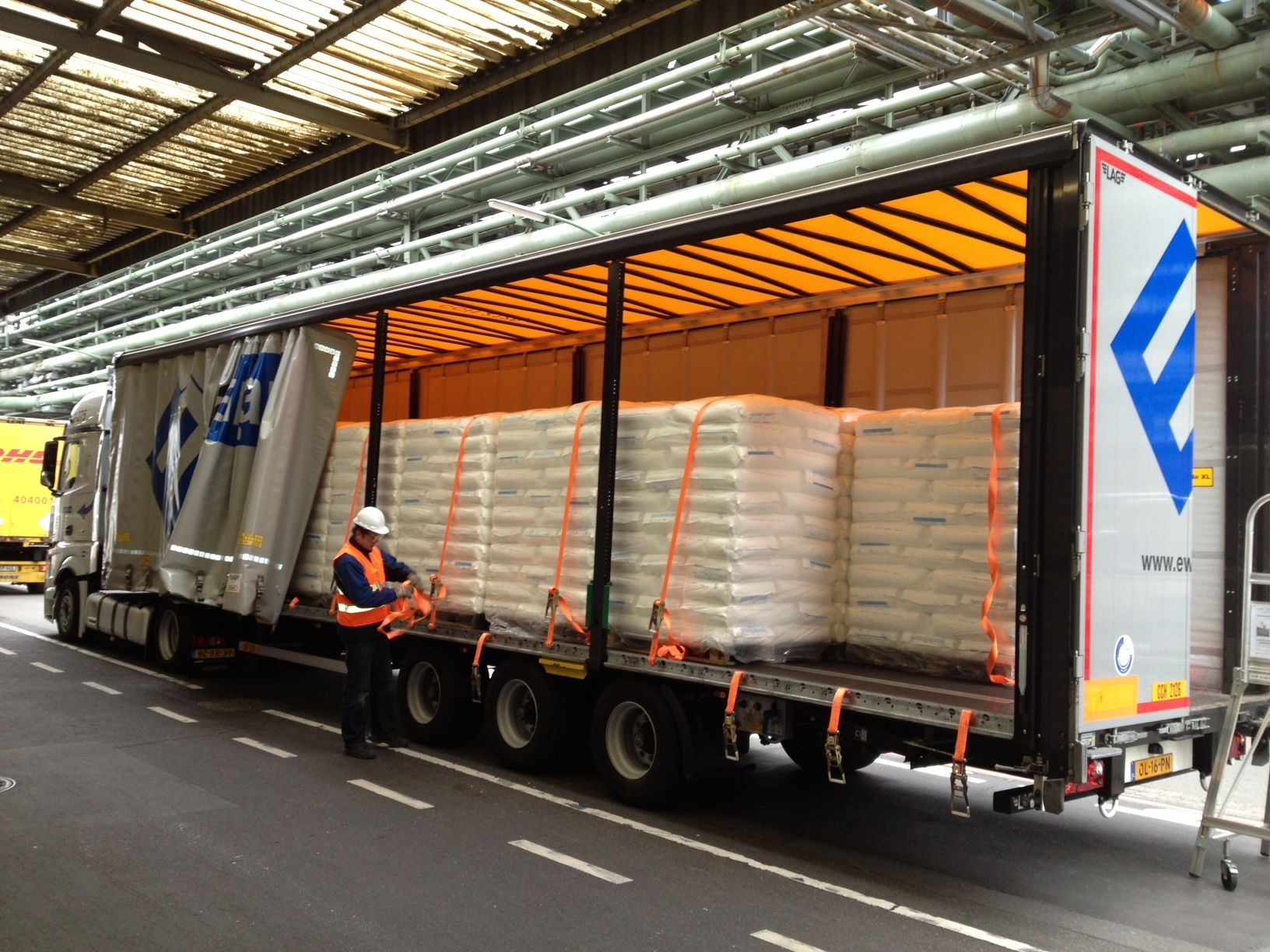
Mega trailer

The mega trailer is a type of trailer which was developed in the 90s by logistics company Ewals Cargo Care in collaboration with the European automotive industry. The purpose of this innovation was to create a trailer which could load up to 100 cubic meters, a growth of approximately 25% compared to the conventional trailers in Europe at the time.

The predecessor of the mega trailer was the so-called swan-neck trailer (1989). This trailer was designed to ship chassis parts of the Opel Vectra. The swan-neck trailer enabled shippers to load five crates instead of three because of its lowered floors which allowed the crates to be stacked.

Next to the need for additional loading capacity, another constraint was that the industry was looking for an alternative to the 'motortruck' (a truck with an attached cargo bay and a trailer behind it). A very efficient and much used form of transport is Ro-Ro (roll-on/roll-off). Ro-Ro basically means that the trailer is pulled onto a ship and pulled off at the unloading port. The truck and driver do not accompany the trailer during the sailing which obviously is far more efficient as they have no function then anyway.

Both the need for additional loading space and the unaccompanied short-sea shipping demanded a new solution which was found in the mega trailer. In this new design, the internal loading height was increased to 3 meters by creating a thinner roof and chassis and lowering the floor. This also meant that a new truck had to be designed with a lower suspension, clutch and power train.

Together with truck producers Ewals Cargo Care looked for a new solution which was eventually found in the lowdeck truck, which was first launched by MAN. Volvo and Scania followed soon after.

Trailer manufacturers such as Krone and Van Hool were responsible for the trailer development which eventually led to the introduction of the all new mega trailer in 1991, a new type of equipment that would very quickly conquer European roads. The total development took two full years, and as soon as the mega trailer went live, the European automotive industry adopted the concept and altered its packaging material to fit the new larger trailer. Other industries followed as well, making sure that the mega trailer covers more than half of all the trailers in Europe and has become a new standard.
