= Bubble Ball =

2010 video game

- Developer(s): Robert Nay
- Publisher(s): Nay Games
- Designer(s): Robert Nay
- Platform(s): iOS, Android
- Release: December 22, 2010
- Genre(s): Puzzle
- Mode(s): Single player

Bubble Ball is a physics puzzle game created by American developer Robert Nay when he was 14 years old. It was released on December 22, 2010 and in its first two weeks was downloaded 2 million times from Apple iTunes. On January 8, 2011, Corona Labs (formerly Ansca Mobile), the company which makes the software development kit that Nay used, chose Bubble Ball as its app of the week and it has since surpassed 16 million downloads, and at one point displaced Angry Birds from its number one spot on the list of free games in Apple app store.

Bubble Ball is a 156-level puzzle game with puzzles ranging from very simple to really challenging. On each level you are given a range of tools and pieces before you hit the Start button. In addition to planks and ramps that can be created with a set of geometric pieces, there are catapults, accelerators and gravity inverters, which must be carefully positioned to make sure your ball gets to the finish goal. This game is number three on "Ansca mobile's Hall of Fame."

As of January 19, 2011, Bubble Ball had been downloaded more than two million times. Current versions of the application can be downloaded from the Apple App Store and Google Play for free.

== Gameplay ==
Bubble Ball is a puzzle and game of strategy involving the principles of physics that determine the trajectory of a bubble-like ball around the screen. The objective is to get it to a finish-line flag. This is similar to the gameplay of the games from The Incredible Machine series.

Gameplay screenshot

In each level of the game, the player is provided a different set of movable items ranging from basic shapes to power-ups that can speed the ball or reverse gravity. The screen also starts with a configuration of the same types of items and fixed walls that cannot be repositioned by the player. After positioning the movable items, the user presses the start button, and the movement of the items on the screen is simulated based on the laws of physics. The user has no further input after the start button is pressed, but can stop the simulation to reposition items as many times as necessary to find a configuration in which the ball eventually reaches the goal. The basic shapes include "metal" objects that stay fixed in position once the action starts, and wood objects that move in response to gravity or collisions with other objects. Moveable objects can be rotated as well as shifted in position.

There are 48 free levels in total that can be accessed from the start point. The graphics are rather plain with simple backgrounds and monochromatic shapes. You can change your ball’s color, however. There are a few sound effects when the ball bounces or reaches its destination. A "pro" version offers 156 levels.

In the versions released in the summer of 2012, a new "Community Levels" feature allows playing hundreds of additional levels created by other users. Users create levels through a web interface at the Nay Games website, and then submit them using a code obtained from the game interface. If approved by the developer, the levels become available to other users. A sorting feature allows sorting the levels by different attributes including difficulty. The easiest levels have been solved by more than 60% of users who have downloaded them, whereas the hardest levels have only been solved by 10% of the users who have downloaded them; the most difficult by only 8%.

== Development ==
According to All Things Digital, the Wall Street Journal blog network, Robert Nay, 14-year-old from Utah, developed the game with his mother, using a software development kit called Corona SDK from Corona Labs Inc. (formerly Ansca Mobile).

Nay’s mother helped Robert design some of the levels and submit the application to Apple iTunes. In an interview with Good Morning America, Nay said he researched mobile software programming in his local library and started creating his new application in November, 2010. It took him about a month to author 4,000 lines of his Bubble Ball game that crept to the top of free games list on the Apple App Store.

In February 2018, version 2.8 was released with 64-bit support, making it compatible with iOS 11 for mobile Apple devices.
