= Koruna =

Koruna may refer to:

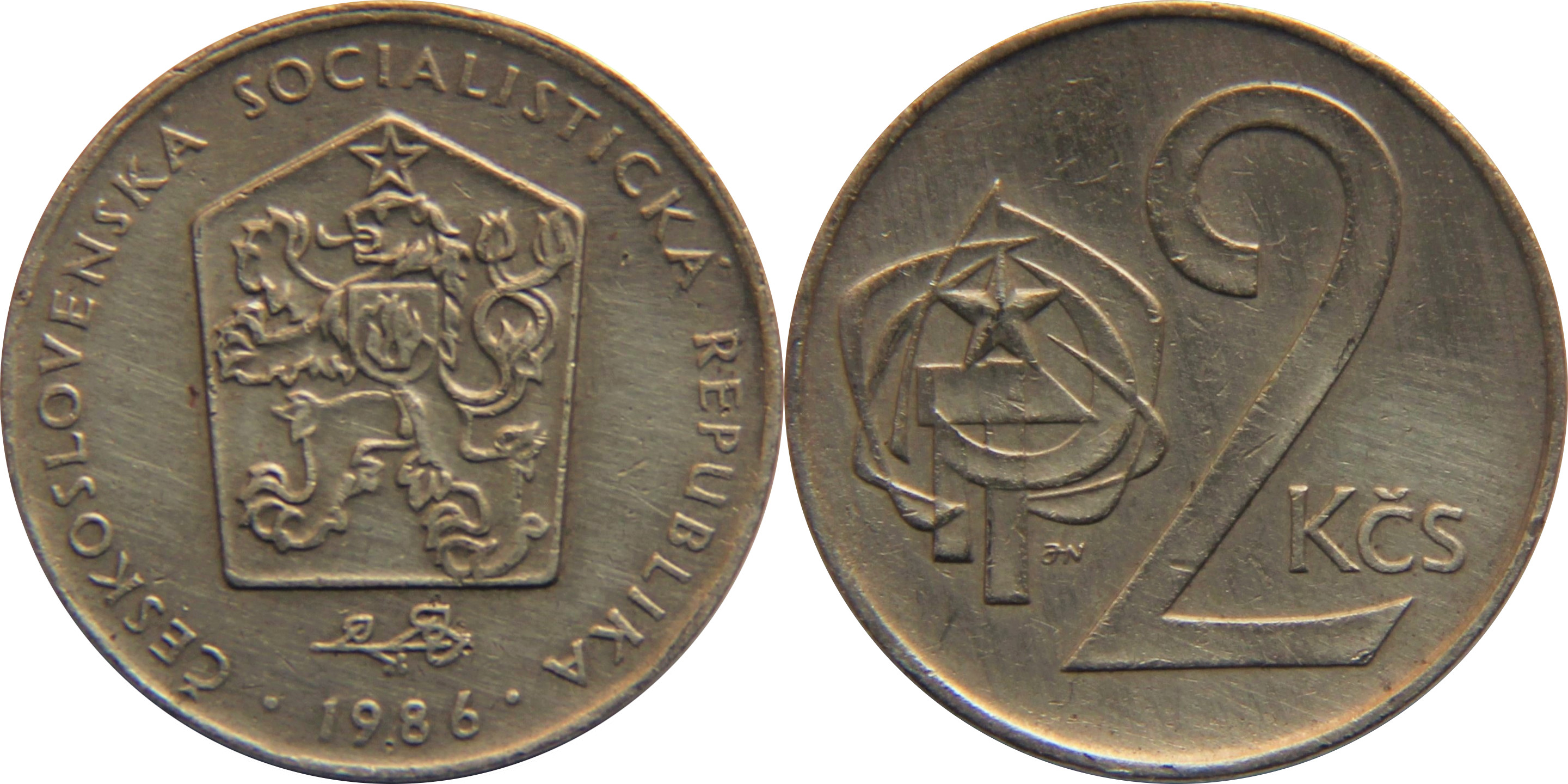
2 Czechoslovak koruna (1986).
Obverse: Coat of arms of Czechoslovakia and linden twig surrounded by year and lettering "ČESKOSLOVENSKÁ SOCIALISTICKÁ REPUBLIKA" (Republic of Czechoslovakia).	Reverse: Hammer and sickle with five-pointed star within abstract linden leaf at left, face-value at right.
205,779,354 coins minted from 1972 to 1990.

== Currencies ==
- Austro-Hungarian krone, localized as koruna in Czech/Slovak
- Bohemian and Moravian koruna
- Czech koruna or Czech crown, the only currency in use with the name
- Czechoslovak koruna
- Hungarian korona, localized as koruna in Slovak
- Slovak koruna

== Other uses ==
- Koruna (Svitavy District), a village in the Czech Republic
- Koruna Česká (party), a Czech monarchist group
- Jabar Koruna, a village in Pakistan
- Zlatá Koruna, a village in the Czech Republic

== See also ==
- Krona (disambiguation)
