= Ewals Cargo Care =

Dutch transport company

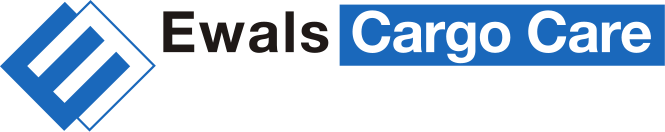

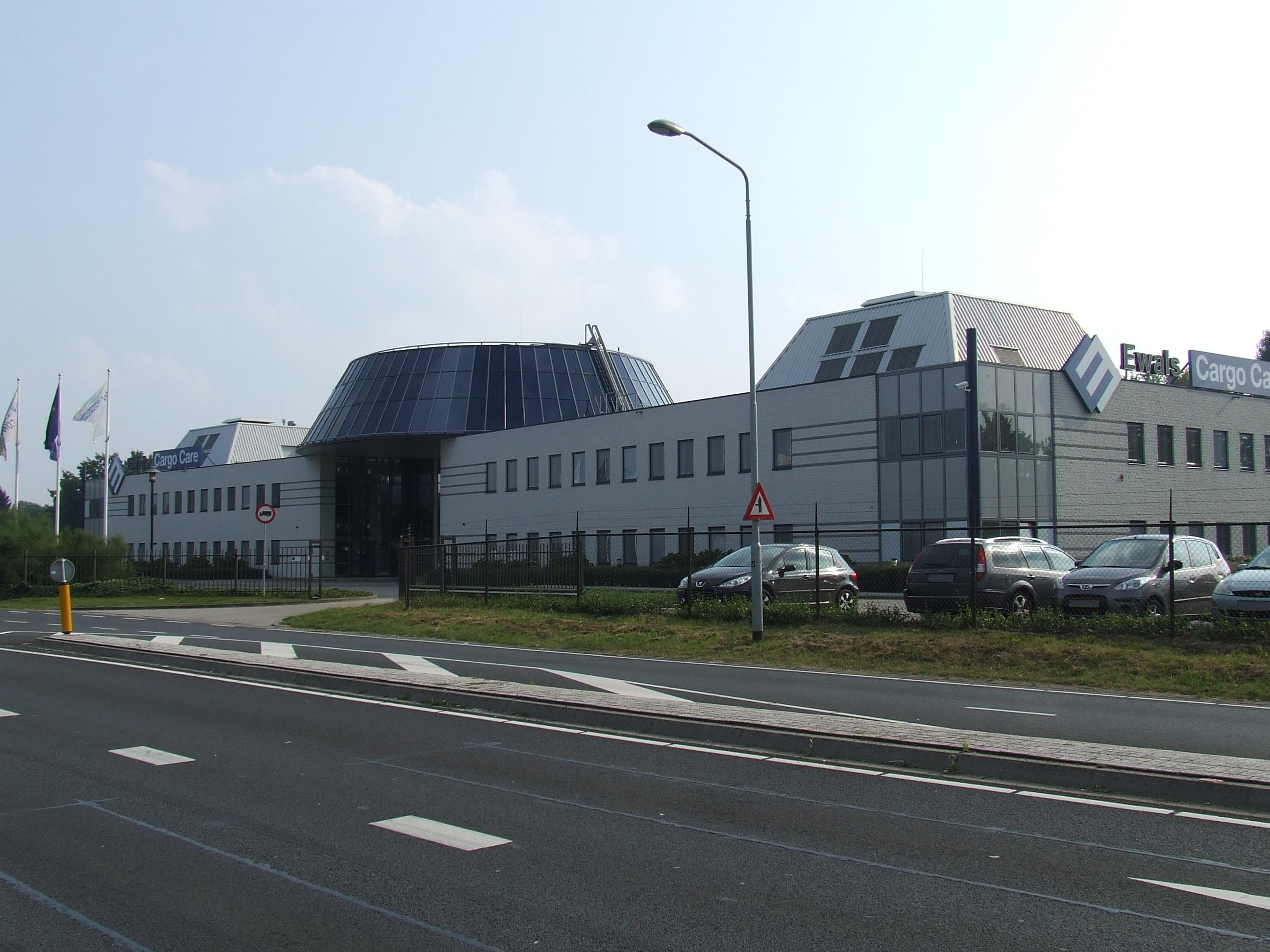
- Ewals headquarter in Tegelen
- Industry: Transport
- Founded: 1906
- Founder: Alfons Ewals
- Headquarters: Tegelen, Netherlands
- Area served: 14 countries
- Revenue: (€600 millions (2022))
- Number of employees: 2,550
- Website: www.ewals.com

Ewals Cargo Care is a Dutch transport company with operations in 14 countries. The company's head office is in Tegelen, The Netherlands.

Ewals Transport was founded in 1906 by Alfons Ewals.

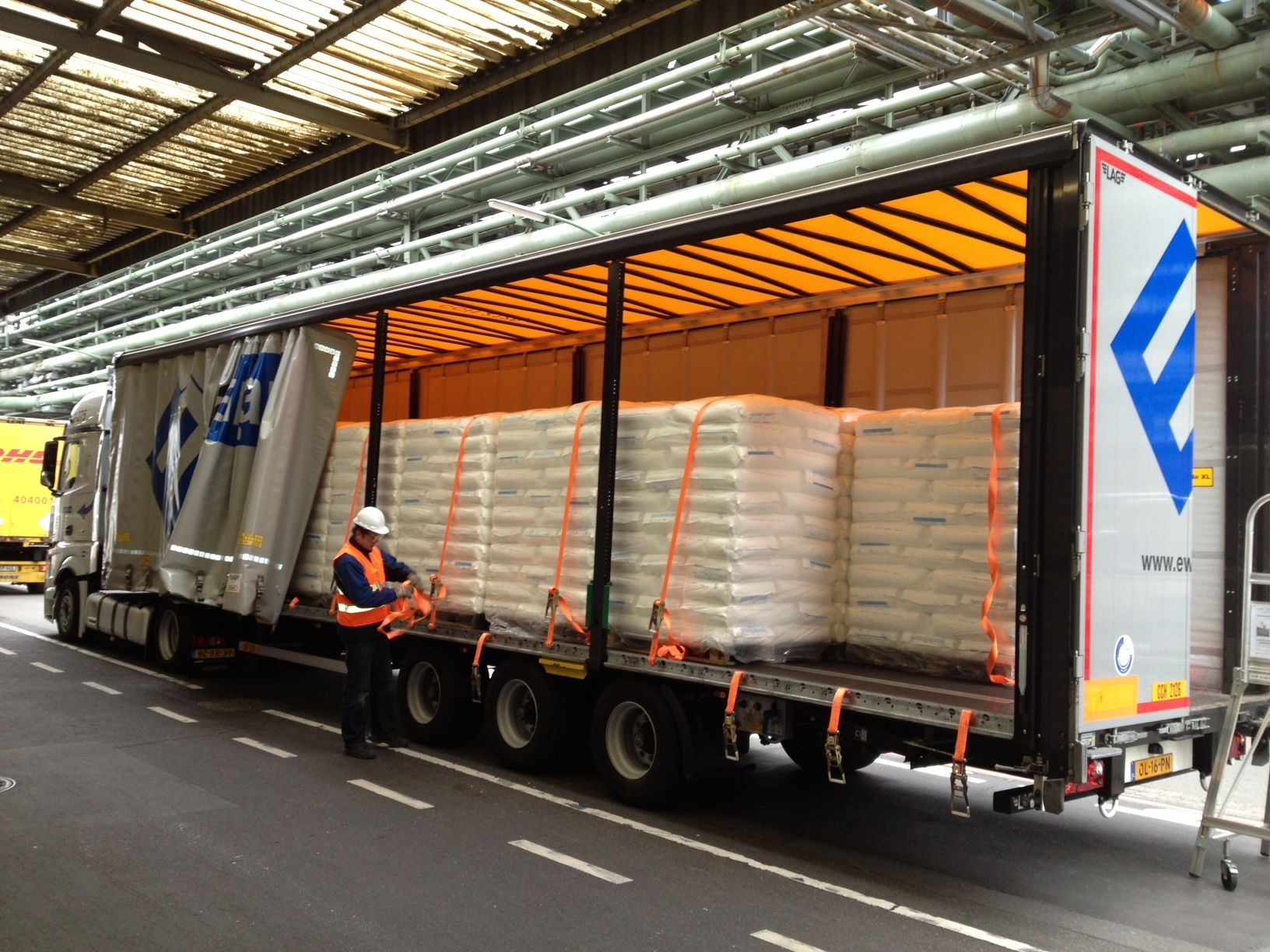
Ewals truck.

In the 1950s and 1960s Ewals expanded to Germany. Due to the growth of the steel and chemical industry during post-war reconstruction, transport services to and from Germany exceeded expectations in those years. In 1974, the company began shipping services to the United Kingdom. Cargo for customers such as Vauxhall, Ford and KNP formed the basis of a new, fast-growing service.

In the late 1970s the company moved from the old market to the site of a former ceramic factory on the Tichlouwstraat. On 17 July 1983 this building was completely lost by a large fire.

In 1984 unaccompanied RoRo services were introduced between the UK and the Netherlands, Belgium and Germany. The service was renamed Cargo Care.

In 1990 Cargo Care introduced the Mega trailer in cooperation with the automotive industry. Cargo Care began two years later with Mega trailer services between the UK and Sweden. It formed an integrated collaboration with existing Ewals services from the continent.

In 1994 Ewals Transport and Cargo Care merged into one company.

Since 1994 the company has developed a European network of logistics services and is the biggest operator of Mega trailers in Europe. It has the capacity to transport full loads to many large European producers, especially in the automotive industry.

By the year 2000, since the launch of the Mega trailer in 1990, the fleet of the company had grown to 3000 trailers. The Mega Huckepack trailer was launched in 2007 as an multimodal, road, rail or short-sea unit. In the meanwhile, more specifically in 2004, Ewals founded its Control Tower to support with the optimisation of (inbound and outbound oriented) supply chains.

In May 2013 it presented the Mega Huckepack XLS trailer that was developed and patented in cooperation with a customer. This trailer has reinforced curtains.

In 2017 Ewals opened new offices and aimed at a further extension of its multimodal network in Europe. In the same year, the company actively approached governmental organisations, other parties on the logistics market and industry organisations to legalise the Duo trailer on Dutch roads. A Duo trailer combines 1 truck and 2 regular trailers connected with a dolly.

In the meantime Ewals is a member of the SEC (Super EcoCombi, its formal name) Community, or in other words, the project team striving for the legalising of this 32-meter long combination.

Ewals currently has around 2,550 employees in the Netherlands, Germany, Belgium, Poland, United Kingdom, Italy, the Czech Republic, Slovakia, Romania, Finland, Spain, Bulgaria, Hungary, and Portugal. The company owns 700 trucks and has another 1,350 trucks of partners at its disposal. In addition, it has 4,400 trailers.
