= Videocracy =

- Directed by: Erik Gandini
- Written by: Erik Gandini
- Produced by: Erik Gandini; Mikael Olsen
- Starring: Silvio Berlusconi; Flavio Briatore; Fabrizio Corona; Lele Mora; Simona Ventura
- Cinematography: Manuel Alberto Claro; Lukas Eisenhauer
- Edited by: Johan Söderberg
- Release dates: 28 August 2009 (Sweden); 4 September 2009 (Italy)
- Running time: 85 minutes
- Countries: Sweden; Denmark; United Kingdom; Finland
- Languages: English; Italian

Videocracy is a 2009 documentary film directed by Swedish-Italian Erik Gandini about Italian television and its impact on Italian culture and politics, and about Silvio Berlusconi's powerful position on all of these. Gandini coined the phrase "The Evilness of Banality" to describe the cultural phenomenon of Berlusconism, thus making a word play on Hannah Arendt's "Banality of Evil".

Soon after its theatrical premiere in Sweden, the film was shown at the 66th Venice International Film Festival where it gained massive attention. The trailer for the film has been banned by most Italian television broadcasters.

Videocracy uses the theme song for Silvio Berlusconi's presidential campaign, and now party theme, Meno male che Silvio c'è! (loosely translated: Thank God for Silvio!). When first hearing it the film's director Erik Gandini thought it was satire.

Videocracy has won awards at the Toronto International Film Festival, Sheffield Doc/Fest, the Golden Graal awards, and the Tempo Documentary Award of 2010. Videocracy was widely distributed internationally, seeing theatrical release in the United States, UK, the Netherlands, France, Poland, and Sweden among other countries. In Italy, where it opened in 90 theaters across the country on the weekend of 4 September 2009, Videocracy came in 4th in box office rankings.

== Premise ==
Videocracy is not a direct examination of Mediaset's influence in Italy and Berlusconi's impact on Italian television, but rather a series of interviews and observations from Gandini with laypeople and those closest to him. Berlusconi is never interviewed, but footage of his speeches and public outings are occasionally interspersed between the interviews and the narrated segments.

== Plot ==
The documentary opens with footage from 1977 quiz show Spogliamoci insieme, where a woman progressively strips herself of clothing whenever the calling audience correctly answers a question posed by the hosts. Gandini narrates how working class men at the time were reported as too tired to go to work the days following the show's airings, and how this phenomenon was the start of what he defines "the President's television".

In north-western Lombardy, 26-year-old factory worker Riccardo "Ricky" Canevali is trying to become a TV star, and auditions for a number of shows on the Mediaset roster. While doing so, he complains that it is more difficult for a man than a woman to become famous on TV, as looks are all that matter in their case. The Italian veline phenomenon is subsequently explained, and footage of a casting call at a mall – where young women are measured, made to pose for shoots, and dance – is shown.

The documentary then shifts to Sardinia's Emerald Coast, presenting the getaway for Berlusconi and his clique: politicians and celebrities, among which are manager Lele Mora and his collaborator Fabrizio Corona, for whom the former acts as an informant. Interviewed in his villa's bedroom, Mora admiringly says that Berlusconi resembles Benito Mussolini, and that he doesn't shy away from praising the qualities both men share; he admits to owning several fascist videos on his cellphone, proudly showing a montage of nazi insignia set to Faccetta Nera to the cameraman.

Fabrizio Corona rides in an unmarked car at night with his paparazzo assistant in order to take embarrassing photographs of celebrities, so that he can ask them for money to not have them published. He explains that he considers himself to be a modern version of Robin Hood: he steals from the rich, but keeps the money to himself because others are even more self-centered and undeserving of fame than he is. When he was convicted for extortion, it made him a greater celebrity, and he is now cashing in on this. He is shown full-frontally naked taking a shower.

The day of his release from prison after his conviction in the Vallettopoli scandal, Corona performs a brief speech in front of the attending news reporters. Erik understands this move and the contents of the speech were carefully planned by him, detailing how Corona is portraying himself as a victim while making the public forget about his recent conviction. Upon asking Corona himself, he confirms his theory, saying he has planned the remainder of his career during his prison stay.

However, Corona's comeback is all but smooth. He is invited to a number of paid appearances at local parties, which he superficially engages with and don't yield much attention. Seeking more fame, Corona asks a grieving father to pose in his ailing agency's T-shirt for a promotional shoot. After the father refuses, he then tries to ask the Cappa twins, two women who participated as witnesses in the then-recent investigations pertaining the 2007 murder of Chiara Poggi; they also refuse to engage with Corona.

This stunt prompts public outrage, which is reported by the news: while Erik's crew is filming, Mora happens to see Corona's attempt to talk to the Cappa sisters during a TG5 news segment, after which he receives a call on his mobile. Desiring to distance himself away from Corona in front of the crew, Mora lambasts him over the phone and paints him as mentally unwell, recounting some of the extravagant and sexually-charged comments he's recently made at him.

The final sequence of the documentary shows a wide, panning shot of dozens of antennas on top of residential buildings. Ricky finally makes it on prime time television, having taken part in a game show. The aspiring veline from the mall dance aimlessly on a platform, as the screen eventually cuts to black. A few statistics regarding Italian television are shown before the credits.
