= Manuel Lozada =

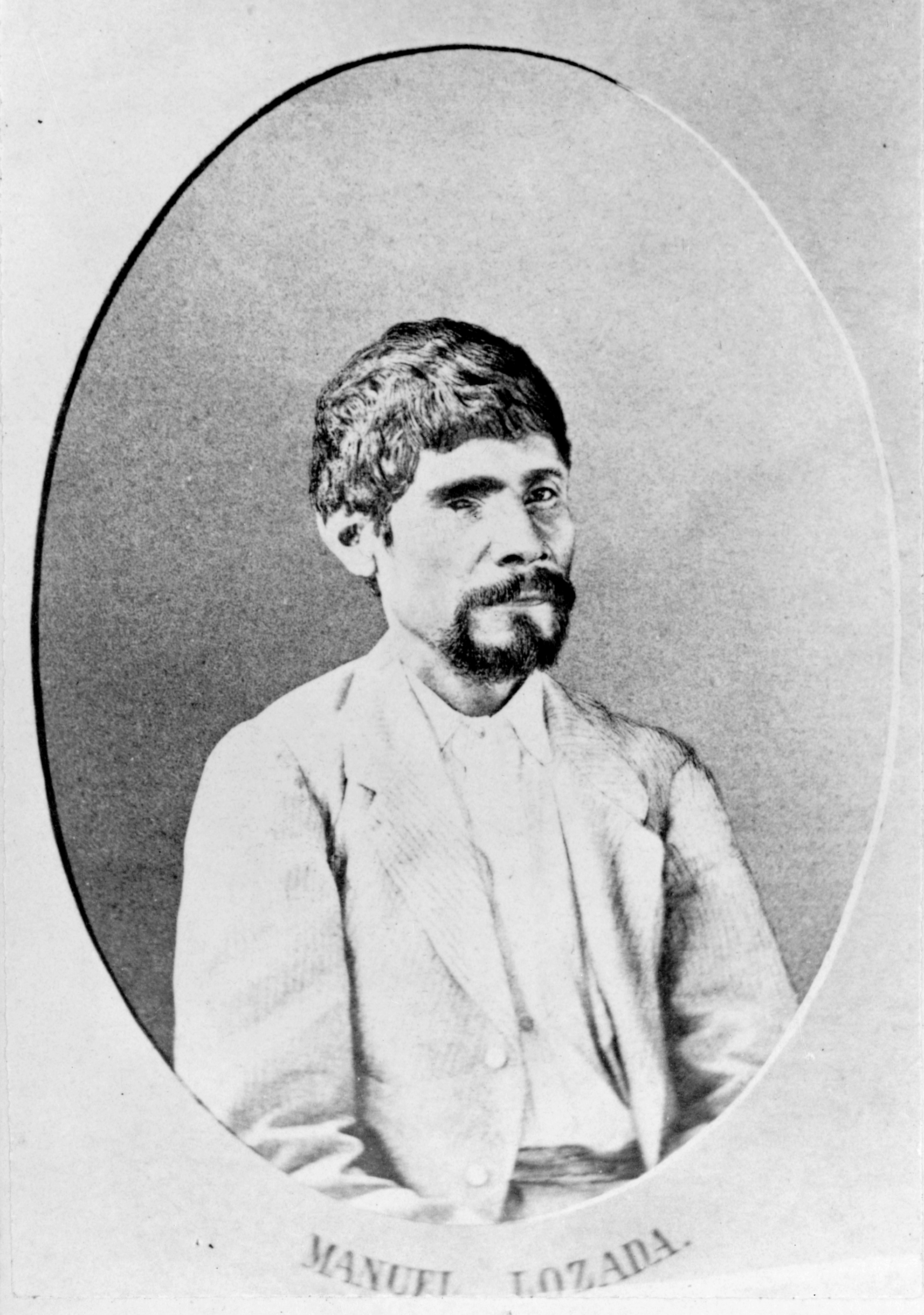

Personal details
- Born: Elpidio García González; 1828 San Luis, Nayarit
- Died: 19 July 1873 (aged 44–45) Loma de los Metales, Nayarit
- Awards: Cruz de la Legión de Honor, France
- Nickname(s): El Tigre de Álica, (The Tiger of Álica)

Military service
- Allegiance: Mexican Army
- Years of service: 1864–1873
- Rank: General
- Commands: Ejército Clerical Intervencionista
- Battles/wars: Second Franco-Mexican War; Lozada rebellion; Battle of Jalisco; Battle of La Mojonera

Manuel Lozada, nicknamed "The Tiger of Álica", was a regional caudillo based in the region of Tepic, Mexico. He was born in 1828 in the Tepic Territory, Mexico and died on July 19, 1873, in Loma de los Metates, Nayarit.

During the Second French Intervention in Mexico he supported the Second Mexican Empire, but switched sides as the Empire began to falter in 1866. After the triumph of the Republic in 1867 he ran afoul of the Mexican government who had him executed as a bandit in 1873. Manuel Lozada is still considered a controversial figure in Latin American history.

== Biography ==
Manuel Lozada was of Mestizo descent as well as being a member of the Cora tribe. He was born to Norberto Garcia and Cecilia González in 1828. His father died when he was a very young child. Lozada's mother lacked the means to raise him so he was adopted by his uncle, José María Lozada, whose surname he adopted. As a boy, he helped his uncle take care of animals on the family farm. When Lozada was young he attended the town's parochial school. He was unable to complete elementary school as he was required to contribute to the family income. This included supporting uncles, aunts, and his five cousins, three of whom died of fever at a young age.

According to a legend, Manuel Lozada grew up to be a cowboy on the Cicero Blanca hacienda of Pantaleón González. He worked as a servant to the wife of the farm owner until his death. He eloped with Maria Dolores, the farmer's daughter, for which he was arrested and sent to the Tepic jail. Once released, he was again imprisoned for searching for Maria Dolores but was released after a short period of time as a result of his mother's pleading. Once freed, he again fled in the company of María Dolores to Sierra de Alica.

A soldier named Simón Mireles whipped Lozada publicly in the town square. This incensed Lozada who, in the company of a group of Cora natives who were discontented with the government, searched for, found, and executed the soldier. The nickname "The Tiger of Alica" was born, and this bandit and sometimes insurgent wreaked havoc for several years in the canton of Tepic.

Another less romantic version says that little is known about his early years. Lozada was a bandit who became prominent during the 1855-56 dispute between two companies in Tepic. He ceased to be a bandit when he allied himself with a prominent family of Tepic, the Rivas.

In 1857, he defeated the troops of Lieutenant Colonel José María Sánchez Román and, in 1859, he dispersed the government troops under the command of Colonel Valenzuela. On 2 November of the same year, he attacked the city of Tepic.

In the 1860s, Lozada's followers made public the demands of indigenous people for their lands. Since this happened during the French intervention in Mexico, Lozada allied himself with the French during the years of 1865–66. One of the French generals awarded Lozada cash for having supplied 3,000 men to the Imperial Army. Maximilian I of Mexico repaid him for his services by creating the province of San José de Nayarit, with Tepic as its capital, and by making Lozada a general. On 12 November 1864, after the French army took possession of Mazatlán, he and his troops entered the city.

As the French empire disintegrated, Lozada defected and supported the Mexican Republic in 1866. He publicly declared allegiance to Juárez. Juárez severed the Tepic region from the state of Jalisco, where Lozada had sworn enemies, and created a federal jurisdiction. It was expedient for Juárez, who had many problems to deal with in the immediate aftermath of the restoration of the Republic, to leave Lozada in place. Lozada urged villagers in the region via a written circular to uphold the laws of the republic and expel bandits. During this period, he strengthened his hold on the region, which was tacitly protected by Juárez. However, after Juárez's death in 1872 of a heart attack, his successor Sebastián Lerdo de Tejada went after Lozada. Lerdo authorized Corona to campaign against Lozada, who in turn raised an army of some 10,000 men to invade central Jalisco. Shot by his rival and sworn enemy General Ramón Corona, military governor of Jalisco, two of Lozada's lieutenants betrayed him and he was captured as he bathed in a mountain stream in the town of Loma de los Metates. He was summarily executed on 19 July 1873, since legal rights had been suspended for those declared bandits. Despite Lozada's death, the central government spent decades afterward attempting to bring Tepic under control.

Manuel Lozada is considered the precursor of the agrarian reform movement in Mexico and indirectly of the creation of the state of Nayarit. There are monuments in his honour in the city of Tepic, Nayarit, and the town of his birth, San Luis de Lozada.

== Other sources ==
- Entry to Manuel Lozada in the Spanish Wikipedia.
