= Coroana =

Coroana may refer to:

- Austro-Hungarian krone, the official currency of the Austro-Hungarian Empire from 1892, localised as coroană in Romanian
- Hungarian korona, a former currency of Hungary, localised as coroană in Romanian
- Coroana, Romania, a village in the Albești, Constanța commune

== See also ==
- Corona (disambiguation)
- Korona (disambiguation)
