= Korona =

Korona may refer to:

== Currencies ==
- Austro-Hungarian krone, the official currency of the Austro-Hungarian Empire from 1892, localised as korona in Hungarian
- Hungarian korona, the replacement currency of the Austro-Hungarian krone in post-World War I Hungary

== Other uses ==
- Korona, Florida, a small unincorporated community in Flagler County, Florida, United States
- Korona, Lublin Voivodeship, a village in east Poland
- Korona Kielce, a football club based in Kielce, Poland
- Crown of the Polish Kingdom, a term used to differentiate the two parts of the Polish-Lithuanian Commonwealth
- Saint Corona, second century Christian martyr
- Novuss, also known as Korona, a game of physical skill

== See also ==
- Corona (disambiguation)
- Coroana (disambiguation)
- Crown (disambiguation)
