= Ramón Corona =

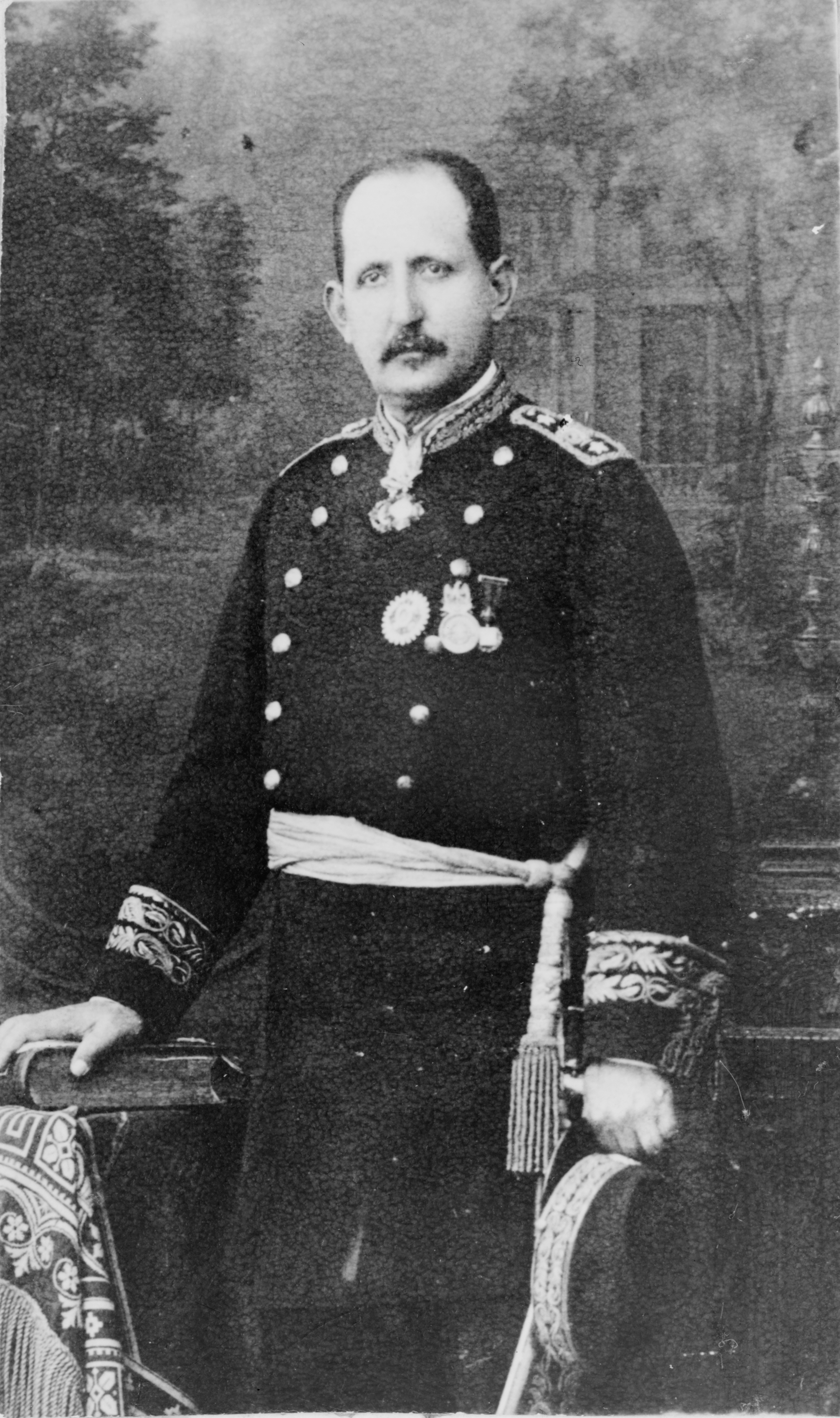
- Died: 11 November 1889
- Occupation: General and diplomat

Ramón Corona Madrigal (Note: In this Mexican name, the surname is Corona and the second or maternal family name is Madrigal.) (18 October 1837 – 11 November 1889) was a liberal Mexican general and diplomat. He served with distinction during the Second French Intervention and after the triumph of the republic, the government assigned him to hunt down the local caudillo, Manuel Lozada. He served as the Mexican minister to Spain but upon his return to the country, Corona was murdered in 1889.

== Biography ==
Ramón Corona was born in Tuxcueca, Jalisco, on 18 October 1837. He was in business in his native town, but had to leave the place on account of persecution by Manuel Lozada, a caudillo, who became a kind of independent ruler in the Tepic territory. Corona joined the liberals, entered the army, soon obtained the rank of general, and fought against the army of Maximilian, especially in the western states, and the French troops never became masters of that part of the country. Corona organized the Army of the West, 8,000 strong, in 1866, and crossed the country, defeating the French in many encounters. He reached Querétaro, participated in the 1867 siege, and, after the final victory of the Mexicans, Maximilian surrendered to him on 15 May. The republic having been reinstated, President Benito Juárez gave Corona a high military office, with residence at Guadalajara.

At that time Lozada, thinking to subjugate the whole nation, organized an army of 16,000 men, and issued a proclamation to his troops, telling them to expect no compensation but what they could get from the vanquished towns. On 28 January 1872, at daybreak, a bloody battle began at Mojonera, near Zapopan, between his forces and about 1,400 men under Corona. Lozada was routed, leaving over 3,000 dead on the field, while the rest of his troops dispersed. Next day Corona entered Guadalajara in triumph, after having saved that city from the army of plunderers, for which he was given the title of "Hero of Mojonera."

President Sebastián Lerdo de Tejada appointed him minister to Spain, where he remained twelve years. He returned to Mexico in 1884, and was put in command of the Federal army at Jalisco. In 1886, he was elected governor of Jalisco.

On 10 November 1889, while walking from the Government Palace to see a play at Guadalajara's Teatro Principal, he was stabbed various times by an individual named Primitivo Ron Salcedo who had previously murdered a local police official. He died of his wounds the following day.
