= Carona =

Carona may refer to:

== Places ==
- Carona, Lombardy, a comune in the Province of Bergamo, Italy
- Carona, Switzerland, a comune in the Canton of Ticino, Switzerland
- Carona, Kansas, United States

== People ==
- Mike Carona, former Sheriff of Orange County, California

== See also ==
- Corona (disambiguation)
