= Fire Maple Games =

Video game development studio

- Type: Independent
- Founded: Garnet Valley, Pennsylvania
- Headquarters: Garnet Valley, Pennsylvania
- Key people: Business Owner: Joe Kauffman
- Products: The Secret Of Grisly Manor; The Lost City; The Hidden World; Return to Grisly Manor; Thickety creek Crookhaven; Maze of Thorns
- Number of employees: 1
- Website: www.firemaplegames.com

Fire Maple Games is a game development studio known for its adventure games, including The Secret of Grisly Manor, which achieved the top spot among paid iPhone applications in 16 markets and was downloaded more than 3.5 million times. The studio achieved similar success with its subsequent release, The Lost City.

Fire Maple Games uses the Corona SDK to develop mobile applications.

== Published games ==
- The Great International Word Search! for Mac OS
- The Secret of Grisly Manor for Android and iOS
- The Lost City for Android, iOS, Kindle and NOOK
- The Hidden World for Android, iOS, Kindle Fire & NOOK
- Akkadia for Windows PC XP or Vista and Mac OS 10.4 or later
- Stunt Squirrels for Android, iOS, Kindle and NOOK
- Danger Cats for Android, iOS, Kindle and NOOK
- Return to Grisly Manor for Android and iOS.
- Thickety Creek for Android and iOS
- Curse of the Cobra for Android and iOS
- Crookhaven for Android and iOS
- Maze of thorns for Android and iOS
