= Puccio Corona =

Italian journalist and television presenter

- Born: Puccio Corona; 9 April 1942; Catania, Sicily, Kingdom of Italy
- Died: 31 December 2013 (aged 71); Rome, Italy
- Occupation(s): Journalist, television presenter
- Years active: 1976–2007
- Height: 1.73 m (5 ft 8 in)
- Relatives: Vittorio Corona (brother, deceased), Fabrizio Corona (nephew)

Puccio Corona (9 April 1942 – 31 December 2013) was an Italian journalist and television presenter, whose career spanned over three decades.

Born in Catania, Sicily, Republic of Italy, Corona began his career in 1976, and retired in 2007. He was the brother of fellow journalist Vittorio Corona (1948–2007), and uncle of photographic agent Fabrizio Corona.

Puccio Corona died on 31 December 2013, aged 71, in Rome, Italy.
