= Nina Morić =

Croatian fashion model (born 1976)

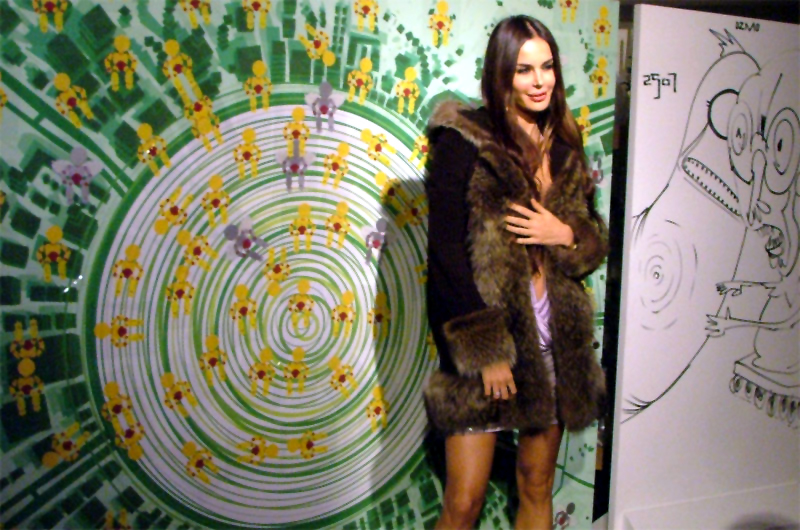
- Born: 22 July 1976 (age 50); Zagreb, SR Croatia, SFR Yugoslavia
- Citizenship: Croatian; Italian
- Occupation: Fashion model
- Spouse: Fabrizio Corona (m. 2001–2007)
- Children: 1
- Modeling information
- Height: 180 cm (5 ft 11 in)
- Hair color: Brown
- Eye color: Blue

Nina Morić (born 22 July 1976) is a Croatian fashion model. She became an Italian citizen after her marriage with celebrity photographer Fabrizio Corona.

== Biography ==
Morić was born in Zagreb into an upper-middle class household. After finishing high school she became a law school student, but then chose to become a professional fashion model after winning the 1996 Croatian Elite "Look of the Year" modeling competition, placing third at the world pageant.

In 1995 she was cast in a music video for Croatian musician Tony Cetinski. While working in Los Angeles in 1999, she was cast in Ricky Martin's hit music video "Livin' La Vida Loca". That same year, she released her debut single as a singer, but due to its lack of success, an album was never produced. She was also selected by Jim Carrey as the female lead to a sequel for the 1994 film The Mask, but negotiations fell through and Carrey eventually left the project.

She has worked for brands and designers such as Versace, Roberto Cavalli, Trend Les Copains, Valentino, Erreuno, Gai Mattiolo, Rocco Barocco, Fausto Sarli, Gattinoni, Mariella Burani, Angelo Marani, Marina Spadafora, Simonetta Ravizza, Guillermina Baeza, Jesus Del Pozo and Barmetal Clothing.

She has since appeared on numerous international covers of men's magazines, such as Maxim.

After a stint in the United States, she moved to Italy and became well known there, continuing her modeling career and working as a television correspondent.

Between 2001 and 2007 Morić was married to Fabrizio Corona, an owner of a photography agency, with whom she had a son, Carlos, born in 2002.

She became an Italian citizen after two years of marriage with Corona.

== Political activity ==
Morić is known for her political views. In 2017, she expressed interest in the neo-fascist movement CasaPound and in March she decided to become an active militant. In June 2017 Morić took part in a rally against illegal immigration and right of the soil with CasaPound's activists. She denounced the Yugoslav president Josip Broz Tito, whose Yugoslav Partisans committed several crimes against Croats and Italians. In January 2018, the journalist Paolo Del Debbio hosted Morić and offered her a virtual debate against an Italian communist, but Morić responded: "I don't talk with communists: they are criminals!"

In August 2017, Morić voiced her anger because of a picture showing Samuel L. Jackson and Magic Johnson. She mistook them for migrants on extravagant shopping spree with money from the Italian citizens. The picture showed the actor and the retired basketball player on a bench surrounded by luxury shopping bags in Forte dei Marmi in Italy. Later the former model realized her mistake and insisted that the post was also an experiment as the picture was originally shared by Luca Bottura as part of a social experiment regarding the perception of migrants in Italy.
