= Vittorio Corona =

Italian journalist (1947–2007)

- Born: Vittorio Corona; 9 May 1947; Aci Trezza, Sicily, Italy
- Died: 24 January 2007 (aged 59); Milan, Lombardy, Italy
- Education: Università degli Studi di Catania
- Occupation: Journalist
- Years active: 1993–2007
- Spouse: Gabriella Privitera
- Children: Fabrizio Corona (b. 1974)
- Relatives: Puccio Corona (brother, deceased)

Vittorio Corona (9 May 1947 – 24 January 2007) was an Italian journalist.

Born in Aci Trezza, Sicily, Corona began his career in 1993. His brother was the journalist Puccio Corona (1942–2013) and his son is thef photographic agent Fabrizio Corona (born 1974).

Vittorio Corona died following a long illness on 24 January 2007, aged 58, in Milan, Lombardy.
