= Jabar Koruna =

- Location within Pakistan
- Coordinates: 32.58°N 70.57°E
- Country: Pakistan
- Province: Khyber-Pakhtunkhwa
- Elevation: 398 m (1,306 ft)
- Time zone: UTC+5 (PST)

Jabar Koruna, is a village in Malakand District of Khyber-Pakhtunkhwa. It is located at 32°58'30N 70°57'54E with an altitude of 398 metres (1309 feet).
