= The Lost City (video game) =

2012 video game

- Developer: Fire Maple Games
- Publisher: Fire Maple Games
- Platform: iOS Android
- Release: Jan 31, 2012
- Genre: Adventure game
- Mode: Single-player

The Lost City is a point-and-click adventure game developed by American studio Fire Maple Games. It was released on iOS, January 31, 2012.

== Critical reception ==
The game has a score of Metacritic of 70% based on 6 critic reviews. Gamezebo wrote "The game gives you tiny threads of story, but really relies on the ambiance and strange compelling puzzles to pull you along. It largely works, though if you're the kind of person that requires action or story to pull you along you'll probably be left disappointed. For me, I relished my time on that weird island, and was sad when it was over and I had to come back to reality." 148Apps said "The Lost City doesn't overstay its welcome, doesn't bore with any complicated story, and doesn't cost too much coin to acquire. It may not be the best game to hit iOS this year but it will easily be one of the most recommendable. Let's hope Fire Maple endeavors further into this genre, they have a knack for it." TouchArcade said "In the end, I found myself trying to slow down and simply enjoy being in the game's atmosphere. I really didn't want the game to end, and I suppose that's the best compliment I can give anything I play". Vandal Online wrote " Those veteran players that miss the times of point and click adventures shouldn't let this app escape. Its price and originality make it a must have for iPhone." SlideToPlay wrote "The Lost City isn't extraordinarily rewarding, but it's a pretty pleasant adventure." Adventure Games wrote "The Lost City is a swift, undemanding adventure that chooses to parade as relaxed mobile entertainment, rather than capitalizing on its potential to be a more memorable adventure gaming experience."
