= Krone BiG X =

Self-propelled forage harvester

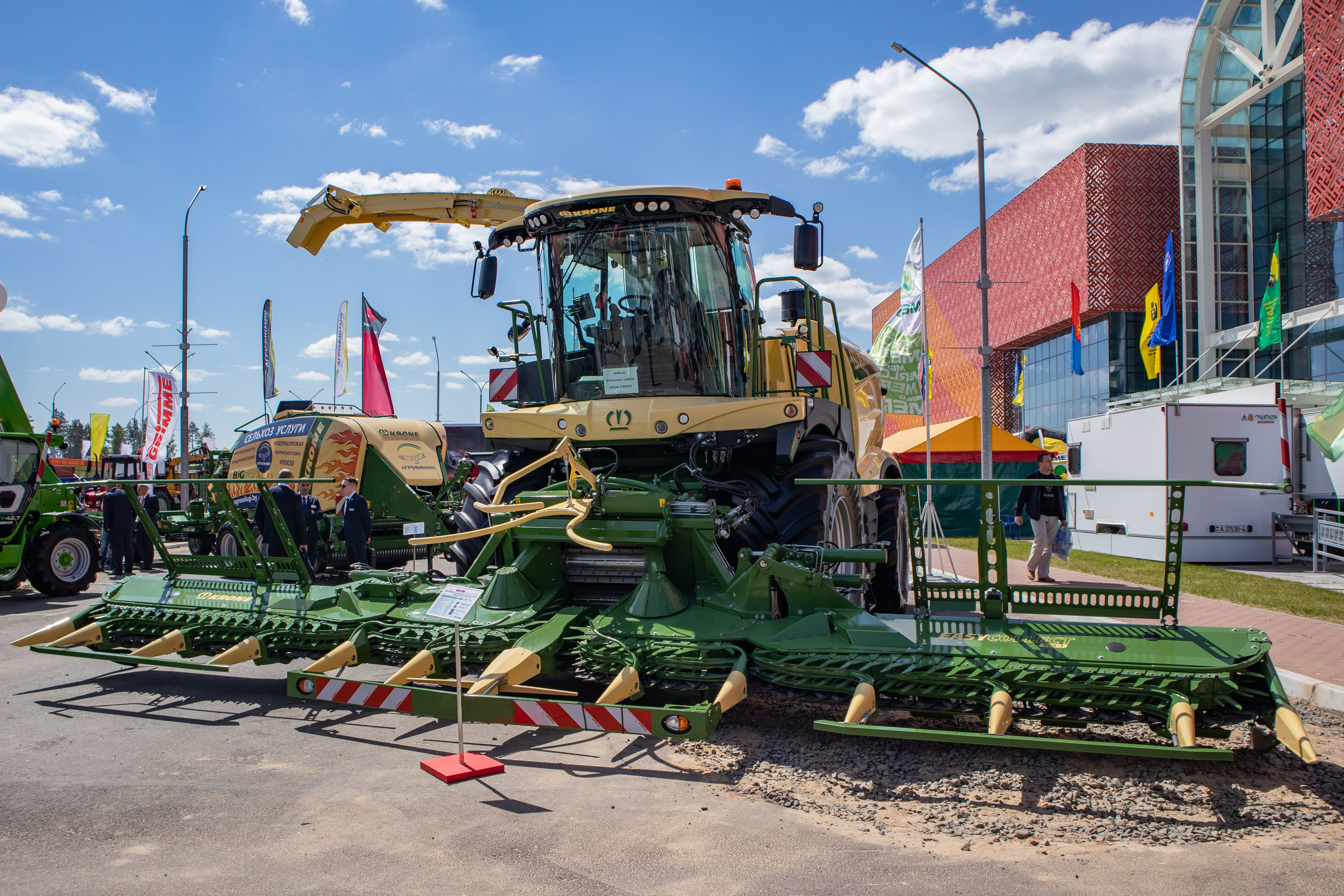
- Type: agricultural
- Manufacturer: Krone Agriculture
- Production: 2000–present
- Speed: Field: 25 km/h Street: 40 km/h
- Preceded by: none
- Succeeded by: none

The Krone BiG X is a self-propelled forage harvester manufactured by the agricultural machinery company Krone Agriculture from Spelle. Since May 2000, this vehicle has been one of Krone's main revenue generators.

== History ==
From May 2000, Maschinenfabrik Bernard Krone produced the first generation of the BiG X forage harvester as BiG X V8 and BiG X V12. Krone initially marketed the engine power as 540 hp. According to the German agriculture magazine Agrarheute, the concept of a forage harvester the size of the BiG X, capable of reaching speeds of 40 km/h and boasting high engine power, was new at the turn of the millennium, and the company was concerned that the true engine power might be perceived as oversized. In reality, the installed V8 engine, a Mercedes-Benz OM 502, had a power output of 605 hp. The BiG X V12 model was even more powerful, equipped with an OM 444 engine capable of up to 780 hp.

In 2007, Krone introduced the second generation with the BiG X 800, which is powered by two different engines that can be synchronized when necessary. The second generation included the BiG X 1000, BiG X 650, and from 2008, the BiG X 500. The BiG X 700, 850, and 1100 models were added in 2010. Since 2007, Krone has equipped its forage harvesters with a photo-optical sensor as standard. Integrated into the corn header, this instrument detects the maturity of the plants through color matching, preserving the structure of the harvested crop and reducing the risk of secondary fermentation.

At the 2013 Agritechnica agricultural trade fair in Hanover, Krone presented the small BiG X series, featuring the forage harvesters BiG X 480 and 580. These new models replaced the previous BiG X 500 and distinguished themselves from their predecessor primarily due to a smaller chopping unit and overall more compact dimensions.

In the same year, Krone introduced the BiG X 600 Edition 2013 featuring a V8 engine from MAN. In 2015, Krone expanded its small range of forage harvesters with the BiG X 530 and 630 models. In September 2018, Krone unveiled its new large forage harvester series with the BiG X 680, 780, 880, and 1180 models, which replaced the old series. According to Krone, the BiG X 1180 is considered the most powerful forage harvester in the world. The vehicle reportedly has a harvesting capacity of 360 t/h according to agricultural technology magazine Profi. Apart from the engine, the BiG X 1180 is identical to the BiG X 680, 780, and 880 models. Also in 2018, for the first time, Krone introduced a roller conditioner called OptiMaxx with a diameter of 305 mm as optional equipment for the BiG X 1180.

In September 2020, Krone unveiled a new generation of the small BiG X series, including the 480, 530, 580, and 630 models, featuring a new cabin, modified crop flow, and transition to emissions stage 5. The gap between the BiG X 880 and the BiG X 1180 in the larger series was filled in September 2022 with the introduction of the BiG X 980 and the BiG X 1080. Similar to the BiG X 1180, the largest forage harvester in the series, the two new models are equipped with V12 engines from Liebherr.

Krone offers two main model ranges with the small BiG X series 480, 530, 580, and 630, as well as the large BiG X series 680, 780, 880, 980, 1080, and 1180. These ranges primarily differ in engine power and, if applicable, the diameter of the kernel processors. For the BiG X 1180, a 305 mm diameter kernel processor can be installed, unlike the other models which are shipped with a kernel processor diameter of 250 mm.

== Technical description ==
The following technical description primarily focuses on the BiG X 1180 model, which is largely identical to the BiG X 680, 780, 880, 980, and 1080 models, differing primarily in engine specifications. Reference will also be made to the smaller models in the current series where appropriate.

=== Basic structure ===
The BiG X 1180 is a self-propelled forage harvester powered by Bosch wheel motors with an independent wheel suspension for the crop feed and a 90° machine pass-through. The crop intake of the forage harvester consists of six hydraulically driven pre-compression rollers. The knives are arranged in pairs and taper V-shaped towards the front axle. The intake can be removed from the machine for maintenance purposes. The design allows access to the chopping drum which has a diameter of 660 mm and a channel width of 800 mm. It can be equipped with universal drums (MaxFlow) with configurations of 20, 28, and 36 knives and biogas drums with configurations of 40, and 48 knives. The chopping drum bottom is curved and directs the chopped material upwards to the conditioning rollers. The conditioner OptiMaxx 250 features a 5-degree angled, diagonally positioned sawtooth profile on the 250 mm large cracking rollers, which, with an additional shearing effect, also process the chopped material in the transverse direction. The OptiMaxx 305, equipped with 305 mm large rollers, is available for the models BiG X 680 through 1180. Compared to the OptiMaxx 250, it has a 20% higher peripheral speed, an 11% larger contact area, and temperature monitoring of the bearings. The two conditioning rollers, each with a 5-degree helical tooth profile, are arranged in a counter-rotating pair and condition (or crack) the chopped material through friction. Their speed difference is 30%, 40%, or 50%. Above the conditioning rollers is the accelerator, which has an adjustable throwing distance and transports the chopped material upward through the throwing channel from the forage harvester into the discharge chute. This chute has a swivel angle of 210° and a discharge height of 6000 mm.

The BiG X 1180 is available with an automatic adjustment of the counter blade, allowing the driver to adjust it from the cab. With the camera-based 3D image analysis, the Easyload automatic loading system fills each transport vehicle alongside in parallel operation or to rear loading of the machine. Additionally, the BiG X features the Variloc system, which allows the drum speed to be adjusted in less than five minutes, enabling the forage harvester to be used for both short and long cuts. The automatic data management in the BiG X is based on Krone's Smart-Connect control unit with autologging function, which transfers the automatically recorded data to the operator's office and utilizes it for transparent billing. Alternatively, an order-based data management system is offered with an app, allowing the driver to navigate directly to the field entrance.

The BiG X series 480, 530, 580 and 630 differs from the BiG X 1180 primarily in basic structure, with a narrower channel width of 630 mm instead of 800 mm. The conditioner is technically identical to that of the larger models.

=== Attachments ===
Four different attachments are available for the BiG X directly from the factory: an EasyFlow pick-up with optional working widths of 3000 or 3800 mm; an EasyCollect row-independent harvesting attachment with optional working widths of 4500, 6000, 7500, 9000, or 10500 mm; an XCollect row-independent harvesting attachment with optional working widths of 6000, 7500, or 9000 mm; and an XDisc direct cutting attachment with a working width of 6200 mm. The XCollect differs from a conventional corn header as it does not require forced cutting. The crop is cut using sickle knives and is structurally separated from the collectors that convey the crop. According to the German agricultural technology magazine Traction, this design ensures functionality even with increased wear. The sickle disc speed can be set to either 1000 or 3000 RPM. The XCollect can be folded for road transportation.

For the BiG X series 480, 530, 580 and 630, the attachments are largely identical to those of the large series, apart from the row-independent corn harvesting attachments (EasyCollect), which are not offered with a 10500 mm working width for the small series.

=== Krone Nir Control dual ===
With the optional Krone Nir Control dual system, data on moisture and the content of harvested crops such as corn, grass, and whole plant silage are captured. This data can be recorded in the machine terminal and assigned to the harvested area. The Krone Nir Control dual system is mounted on the discharge chute of the BiG X. The Nir sensor is used both for determining content in Krone's harvesting technology and in the Zunhammer company's VanControl dual system to capture ingredients in organic fertilizers.

=== Drive ===
The forage harvester BiG X has two power paths, one mechanical and one hydraulic. All flow components (the chopping drum, conditioning rollers, and accelerator) are mechanically driven by a composite V-belt from the engine. The torque output to the pulley at the engine can be engaged and disengaged via a multi-plate clutch. The V-belt directly drives the chopping drum and accelerator via a pulley, while the conditioning rollers are driven on the opposite side by a second composite V-belt running over the accelerator. Variloc, a two-stage planetary gear is integrated into the pulley of the chopping drum, enabling a chopping drum speed of either 1250 or 800 RPM. A gearbox is flanged to the engine, to which the hydraulic pump for the propulsion drive and for driving the pre-compression rollers is flanged to.

Unlike the large BiG X, the small series forage harvesters do not require a motor output gearbox for sending power to the wheels. Engagement of all flow components is done via a belt clutch.

=== Chassis, tires, and cabin ===
As described, the harvester has hydraulic power transmission to the wheels; it features hub motors made by Bosch Rexroth, and planetary gear sets. The rear axle is a sprung double wishbone axle, which can also be equipped with hub motors upon request. There are two driving modes: a field driving mode with a range from 0 to 25 km/h and a road driving mode with a range from 0 to 40 km/h; the driving speed can be continuously adjusted. From the factory, there are five different front tire combinations and four different rear tire combinations available, with front tire widths ranging from 680 to 900 mm and rim sizes of 32, 38, or 42 inches; the 500, 620, or 710 mm wide rear tires are always mounted on 30-inch rims. All tires are radial tires. The cabin is optionally height-adjustable and can be raised by up to 700 mm.

The chassis and cabin of the small series are identical to the large BiG X. The tire options range from 680 to 900 mm with rim sizes from 32 to 42 inches.

=== Engines ===
In the BiG X, conventional industrial diesel engines from various suppliers are installed, including Daimler-Chrysler, MAN, MTU, and Liebherr.

The BiG X 980/1080/1180 is equipped with a transversely mounted Liebherr D 9512 V12 diesel engine, while the models BiG X 680/780/880 feature Liebherr D 9508 V8 diesels. With a cylinder bore of 128 mm and a piston stroke of 157 mm, this results in a displacement of 24.24 liters and 16.16 liters, respectively. The engine, with exhaust turbocharging and intercooling, has overhead valves, and does not have hydraulic tappets.

According to information from the German agricultural magazine Profi, the BiG X 1180 engine has a continuous output of 850 kW (1156 hp) at 1400 to 1800 RPM. The continuous output in XPower chopping mode is reported to be 818 kW (1112 hp), according to agricultural magazine Traction. In EcoPower mode, the power is electronically limited to 441 kW (600 hp). Maintenance intervals are set at 1000 operating hours. The harvester complies with Tier 4 final emission standards; an SCR-only strategy is used, which exclusively employs an SCR catalyst without an oxidation catalyst, exhaust gas recirculation, or diesel particulate filter. The BiG X 1180 is equipped with multiple fuel tanks, with a combined capacity of either 1100 or 1500 liters. Additionally, there is a 150-liter auxiliary tank for AdBlue and a 230-liter auxiliary tank for silage additive, with an option for an additional 275-liter silage additive tank.

== Technical Specifications (As of 2018) ==
BiG X 680 to 1180
| Model | 680 | 780 | 880 | 980 | 1080 | 1180 |
|---|---|---|---|---|---|---|
| Year of Manufacture | 2017 | 2017 | 2017 | 2022 | 2022 | 2018 |
| Engine | Liebherr D9508 | Liebherr D9508 | Liebherr D9508 | Liebherr D9512 | Liebherr D9512 | Liebherr D9512 |
| Number of cylinders | 8 | 8 | 8 | 12 | 12 | 12 |
| Displacement (L) | 16.16 | 16.16 | 16.16 | 24.24 | 24.24 | 24.24 |
| Engine Continuous Power (kW/hp) | 505/687 | 570/775 | 660/898 | 720/979 | 790/1074 | 850/1156 |
| Chopping Continuous Power XPower (kW/hp) | 487/662 | 550/748 | 632/860 | 688/936 | 758/1031 | 818/1112 |
| Chopping Continuous Power EcoPower (kW/hp) | 368/500 | 368/500 | 441/600 | 441/600 | 441/600 | 441/600 |

BiG X 480 to 630
| Modell | 480 | 530 | 580 | 630 |
|---|---|---|---|---|
| Year of Manufacture | 2013 | 2015 | 2013 | 2015 |
| Engine | MTU 6R 1300 | MTU 6R 1300 | MTU 6R 1500 | MTU 6R 1500 |
| Number of cylinders | 6 | 6 | 6 | 6 |
| Displacement (L) | 12.8 | 12.8 | 15.6 | 15.6 |
| Engine Continuous Power (kW/hp) | 360/490 | 390/530 | 436/593 | 480/653 |
| Chopping Continuous Power XPower (kW/hp) | 338/460 | 368/500 | 408/555 | 452/615 |
| Chopping Continuous Power EcoPower (kW/hp) | - | - | 338/460 | 338/460 |
