= Salvador Corona =

- Born: Salvador Corona; 1895; Chihuahua, Mexico
- Died: 1990 (aged 94–95); Tucson, Arizona
- Movement: Folk Art

Salvador Corona (1895–1990) was a Mexican-American bullfighter and artist.

== Life and work ==
Salvador Corona was born on his family's ranch Hacienda Mideras in the Mexican state of Chihuahua. Corona’s family moved to Mexico City in 1903 when he was 8. He attended the New English College in Mexico and then crossed into a career in bull fighting entering the ring for the first time in 1913. In 1919 in Guadalajara he was gored and turned to painting. He was given his first painting lessons by fellow bullfighter Jose Jimenez.

His traditional self-developed folk art style images depicted pastoral colorful scenes of Maximilian era Mexico painted on white backgrounds.

His work can be divided into three categories: a vice-regal era with European and Creole noblemen mixed with Indians; stylized landscapes of Patscuaro, Acapulco or the Canal of Santa Anita; and his iconographic Mexican Virgins painted in tones of blue, purple, and gold often encrusted with mother of pearl.

Corona moved to Tucson in 1950. His studio and residence was located at 1701 East Speedway Boulevard, and then 902 North 4th Avenue overlooking Catalina Park.

While in Tucson his work was sold exclusively through Frank Patania Thunderbird shops located next to the Fox Theatre (Tucson, Arizona) and in Josias Joesler designed Broadway Village. His work was owned by U.S. President Franklin D. Roosevelt.

== Mural location ==
- Bates House (Old Mountain Oyster Club): Stone and Toole Avenue Tucson Arizona (interior and exterior)
- Howell Manning House: Tucson Arizona
- Hacienda Corona (Bed & Breakfast and Event Center), Nogales Arizona (extensive; exterior, well preserved)
- Vince's Fine Italian Food, Speedway Blvd. Tucson, Arizona (painted over)
- Jacome Department Store, Tucson Arizona (location of mural panels unknown)
- El Rancho Grande Hotel, Tucson, Arizona
- Frank Patania residence, Catalina Vista, Tucson, Arizona (unknown condition)
- Alex Jacome residence, Tucson, Arizona (unknown condition)
- Charles P. Neumann residence, Tucson, Arizona
- Mitchell A. Ferguson residence, Tucson, Arizona
- Matty Family Residence, Tucson, Arizona, until removed in October, 2013 and donated to the Arizona Historical Society
