= SS Corona =

Cargo ship built in 1922

History
- Name: Ingrid Horn (1922-1926); Margret (1926-1928); Nelly (1928-1936); Corona (1936-1945); Empire Concerto (1945-1946); Corona (1946-1960)
- Owner: H C Horn (1922-1926); AS DS Thorunn (1926-1928); DS Vesterhavet AS (1928-1936); Finska Angfartyges Ab (1936-1945); German Government (1945); Ministry or War Transport (1945); Ministry of Transport (1945-1946); Finska Angfartyges Ab (1946-1960)
- Operator: H C Horn (1922-1926); S Sturlung (1926-1928); J. Lauritzen A/S (1928-1936); Finska Angfartyges Ab (1936-1945); German Government (1945); Ministry or War Transport (1945); Ministry of Transport (1945-1946); Finska Angfartyges Ab (1946-1960)
- Port of registry: (Weimar Republic) Flensburg (1922-1926); (Norway) Bergen (1926-1928); (Denmark) Esbjerg (1928-1936); (Finland) Helsingfors (1936-1945); (Nazi Germany) Kiel (1945); (United Kingdom) London (1945-1946); (Finland) Helsingfors (1946-1960)
- Builder: Lübecker Maschinenbau-Gesellschaft
- Launched: 1922
- Identification: Code Letters NGVS (1928-34); Code Letters OYYD (1934-1936); Code Letters OFAG (1936-1945); Code Letters GFLK (1945-1946); Code Letters OFAG (1946-1960); Finnish Official Number 790 (1937-45, 1946-1960)
- Captured: by Nazi Germany in March 1945; by the Allies in May 1945
- Fate: Scrapped

General characteristics
- Tonnage: 1,549 GRT; 896 NRT
- Length: 263 ft 0 in (80.16 m)
- Beam: 37 ft 8 in (11.48 m)
- Depth: 22 ft 7 in (6.88 m)
- Installed power: Triple expansion steam engine
- Propulsion: Screw propeller
- Speed: 9 knots (17 km/h)

Corona was a 1,549 GRT cargo ship that was built in 1922 by Lübecker Maschinenbau-Gesellschaft, Lübeck, Germany as Ingrid Horn for German owners. She was sold in 1926 to Danish owners and renamed Nelly. In 1936, she was sold to Finnish owners and renamed Corona.

In 1944, she was seized by Germany, and then by the Allies in 1945. She was passed to the Ministry of War Transport (MoWT) and renamed Empire Concerto. In 1946, she was returned to her Finnish owners and renamed Corona, serving until 1960 when she was scrapped.

== Description ==
The ship was built in 1922 by Lübecker Maschinenbau-Gesellschaft, Lübeck.

The ship was 263 feet 0 inches (80.16 m) long, with a beam of 37 feet 8 inches (11.48 m) and a depth of 14 feet 0 inches (4.27 m). She had a GRT of 1,549 and a NRT of 896.

The ship was propelled by a triple expansion steam engine, which had cylinders of 21 3/5 inches (55 cm), 34 1/4 inches (87 cm) and 55 1/16 inches (139.9 cm) diameter by 35 2/5 inches (90 cm) stroke. The engine was built by Lübecker Maschinenbau-Gesellschaftt. The engine could propel her at 9 knots (17 km/h).

== History ==
Ingrid Horn was built for H C Horn, Flensburg. In 1926, she was sold to Dampskip Thorunn A/S, Bergen, Norway and renamed Margret. She was placed under the management of S Sturlung. In 1926, she was sold to A/S Dampskibs Selskab Vesterhavet, Copenhagen, Denmark and renamed Nelly, operating under the management of J. Lauritzen A/S. Her port of registry was Esbjerg and the Code Letters NGVS were allocated. Her Code Letters were changed to OYYD in 1934.

In 1936, Nelly was sold to Finska Angfartyges Ab, Helsinki and was renamed Corona. Her port of registry was Helsingfors and the Code Letters OFAG were allocated. The Finnish Official Number 790 was allocated.

In October 1944, Corona was detained in port at Holtenau, Germany. In March 1945, she was seized by Germany. In May 1945, Corona was seized by the Allies at Kiel. She was passed to the MoWT and renamed Empire Concerto. She was placed under the management of A F Henry & MacGregor Ltd. Her port of registry was London and the Code Letters GFLK were allocated. She was returned to Finska Angfartyges Ab in 1946 and renamed Corona. Her former Code Letters OFAG and Finnish Official Number 790 were reallocated. She served until 1960, when she was scrapped at Tyko Brok, Finland.
