= Corona (restaurant) =

Coordinates: 52°4′44.59″N 4°18′36.16″E

Les Saisons
- Interactive map of Les Saisons

Restaurant information
- Chef: Robert Kranenborg
- Food type: French
- Rating: Michelin Guide
- Location: Buitenhof 42, The Hague, 2513 AH, Netherlands

Restaurant Les Saison, part of Hotel Corona, is a defunct restaurant in The Hague, Netherlands. It was a fine dining restaurant that was awarded one Michelin star in 1988 and retained that rating until 1992.

In the time of the Michelin stars, head chef was Robert Kranenborg.

Hotel Corona is located in three 17th-century buildings, within sight of the Dutch parlementary buildings. It reopened after an extensive renovation in January 2012.

Restaurant Les Saison closed down in 1992, partly because head chef Kranenborg moved on to La Rive in Amsterdam, but also because the owners, Heineken International, sold the hotel to Ad Ph. Siliakus. The new owner, later Chagall Hotels & Restaurants and Hampshire Hospitality & Leisure, wanted a brasserie instead of a fine dining restaurant.

== See also ==
- List of Michelin starred restaurants in the Netherlands
