= Corona Labs Inc. =

Defunct software company

Corona Labs, Inc.
- Type: Mobile software company
- Founded: 2008
- Founders: Carlos Icaza; Walter Luh
- Defunct: May 1, 2020
- Headquarters: Palo Alto, California, United States
- Number of employees: 18
- Website: Archived website

Corona Labs Inc., formerly Ansca Mobile, was a software company based in Palo Alto, California, best known for building a 2D game and app development platform. Its most popular product was the Corona SDK, a cross-platform mobile development framework that builds native apps for iOS, Android, Amazon Kindle, Windows Phone, tvOS, Android TV, and Mac and Windows desktops from a single code base. Corona products use the programming language Lua. The company changed hands several times before closing on May 1, 2020.

== History ==
Corona Labs was founded as Ansca Mobile in 2008 by Carlos Icaza, who previously oversaw projects such as Macromedia's Flash Lite and Adobe Illustrator, and Walter Luh, the leading architect on the Flash Lite team. The name Ansca was inspired by Icaza's childhood in a cooperative agricultural community in Nicaragua; there, ANSCA was the Algodoneros Nicaragüenses Sociedad Cooperativa Agrícola, or the Nicaraguan Cotton-Workers Agricultural Cooperative Society. Ansca closed a $1 million Series A funding deal on September 9, 2009 after receiving support from venture capital firm Merus Capital.

That December, Ansca released the first version of Corona SDK, a software development kit that was used to create apps such as The Lost City, Bubble Ball (created by 14-year old Robert Nay), and Dabble (created by 84-year old George Weiss). SDK initially supported iOS only but quickly expanded to support Android systems. The following year, Amazon's Kindle Fire and the Barnes & Noble Nook were supported as well.

By 2012, Corona had 15 employees. That April, Icaza departed the company for personal reasons and Luh took over as CEO; in June, Ansca became Corona Labs. In August, after receiving $2 million in funding from investors, the company released Corona Enterprise, which allows developers to integrate any native Objective-C and Java library. In December, they acquired the Dubai-based Game Minion, a company working on similar projects. They combined to create Corona Cloud, launched in 2015, which "allowed developers to more easily add features like leaderboards, achievements, chat and more to their mobile games." Corona SDK Starter's launch in April 2013 expanded SDK's available tools and became the lowest tier with limited tools available for free under SDK Pro and SDK Enterprise.

The Toronto-based mobile monetization firm Fuse Powered, Inc. acquired Corona in fall 2014. Acquisitions and mergers were happening frequently within the game monetization industry at this time, with competitors Unity Technologies acquiring Playnomics and Applifier, and Kontagent and PlayHaven merging to form Upsight. In a public statement about the acquisition, Luh said that adding Fuse's skillsets to Corona's allowed their "developers... amazing monetization and publishing tools at their disposal, with even more to come." By 2014, SDK was being used by more than 300,000 game developers worldwide.

In December 2015, just over a year later, Corona Labs was bought by rewards program platform Perk.com, Inc. for $2.3 million. In September of the following year, the company was again sold, this time to Perk co-founder Roj Niyogi, for his shares in Perk, $1.7 million in aggregate cash, and up to $750,000 to facilitate the transfer. Corona Ads, a monetization option later made redundant by the addition of other monetization features, was replaced with the Corona Professional Bundle, a subscription-based ad plugin model.

Corona again changed hands in March 2017, this time to the ad platform management company Appodeal. That June, the Corona framework was made free, and all Corona products moving forward were consolidated into a collective product, simply called "Corona." In 2019, Corona's game engine became open-source. In February 2020, Corona announced that it would be closing on May 1, with any remaining products to be released under an open-source license. In April 2020, the engine was renamed from Corona SDK to Solar2D.
