= Leticia Gutiérrez Corona =

Mexican politician (born 1951)

- Born: 20 May 1951 (age 75); Guadalajara, Jalisco, Mexico
- Occupation: Politician
- Political party: New Alliance Party

Leticia Gutiérrez Corona (born 20 May 1951) is a Mexican politician affiliated with the New Alliance Party. As of 2014 she served as Deputy of the LIX Legislature of the Mexican Congress as a plurinominal representative.
