= Livia Corona Benjamin =

Mexican artist

Livia Corona Benjamin (born 1975) is a Mexican artist that centers her work on the relationship of human experience and the man-made. Her recent work is artisanal but combines multi genre practice of the developing world and new innovations.

== Biography ==
Corona Benjamin was born in Ensenada, Mexico and now works in both Mexico and the United States. She attended The Art Center in Pasadena, California where she received her Bachelor of Fine Arts. In 2009, she received the Guggenheim Fellowship award for her project Two Million Homes for Mexico. Furthermore, she was a recipient for SNCA Endowment for the Arts Fellowship, along with being a nominee for the Prix Pictet in 2013. In her recent work Nobody Knows, Nobody Knew , she explores social economic history and political symbolism that tackles the structures built in rural communities. This work consists mostly of photographs, painting and videos that uncover these grain silos that damage rural Mexico. Most of her projects unveil the disuse of these silos and mass migration from rural Mexico to the United States.

Livia Corona Benjamin has had success with her artwork, as she has been in many exhibits. Her work has been seen worldwide which include LACMA, Los Angeles, New Museum of Contemporary Art, New York City, Mexico City, Spain and many more international exhibits. These works can be found in a collections of the Museo de Art Carrillo Gil, the Portland Museum of Art, William Benton Museum of Art, along with many other private collections. Benjamin's work expands to monographs, books, and catalogues.

== Education ==
- Bachelor of Fine Arts from The Art Center in Pasadena, California

== Artworks ==
Pacha, Llaqta, Wasichay: Indigenous Space, Modern Architecture, New Art discusses indigenous artwork that contains to Indigenous American ideas about their built environment and natural world. The title of the artwork are in Quechua, which is the language spoken by many Indigenous Americans. Each of the three words in the title hold a true significant value. For instance, Pacha means “denotes universe, time, space, nature, or world”. Llaqta values “place, country, community, or town”. Lastly, Wasichay means “building or constructing a house”. All of these meaning are influenced within the artwork that explore means of Indigenous groups from Mexico and South America. These include: Aymara, Maya, Aztec, and Taino. Although this work consists of various artists, Livia Corona Benjamin inputs her notion of complex relations amongst construction, land, and space that are indigenous in the Americas.

Nadie Sabe, Nadie Supo is Benjamin's first solo exhibit that is primarily composed of two parts of photograms and a video. These two parts are separate but ultimately combine with Benjamin's project of exploring the silos in her native Mexico, which are built by the government. For instance the photograms aspect relates to Benjamin's project entitled, Infinite Rewrite. This project features images composed of granulated particles that create an illusion. Individually, each images establishes an equilibrium, that is replaced by the next image. These photograms play a role of photography during a time of digital reception and automation.

Manhattan Transfer is presented in photography and sculpture, is Benjamin's first solo show in New York. This piece draws the ideal of Manhattan being the center for artistic achievements. The artwork includes a series of sculptures and unique photographs that pairs American idioms of culture with the trade goods of colonization along with cultural commodities.

Previous/Next uses her fond interests of silos by taking photographs of abandoned grain solos that are throughout Mexico. Using these images, she is able appropriate the characteristics of her interests in silos in order to investigate of making and viewing images. Ultimately, Benjamin's goal is to discover the architectural process of salvage, deconstruction, and reuse.

The Week In Pictures consists of C-prints which are silhouetted shapes against a different colored background. Overlapping, these create echoing contours of white negative space. These images appear to be abstract, but each are sketches drawn from Benjamin by the process of abstraction. By this method, she is able to rebuild her own scheme and offer and new transformed picture.

The Road Was Paved With Silver is a socio-political artwork that explores Mexico's artisanal tourist trade. It further elaborates on the country's history as well as the global market in economic instability and political violence. The piece all use a silver material that helps "read" the piece, as the country's conflicting histories with these materials. Furthermore, Benjamin considers Mexico's booming silver tradition. As a result, Benjamin works to distance toward the flow of industrial world trade, while reflecting upon the individual and their works as they become embodied into the pressure of mass production.

== Exhibitions ==
- 2016 Nadie Sabe, Nadie Supo. Parque Galería. Mexico City, Mexico
- 2015 Manhattan Transfer. Sgorbati Projects. New York, NY, USA
- 2014 Previous/Next. Galería Agustina Ferreyra. San Juan, Puerto Rico
- 2011 Of People And Houses. Hartell Gallery, Cornell University. Ithaca, NY, USA
- 2010 Enanitos Toreros. Oregon Center for the Photographic Arts. Portland, OR, USA
- 2009 Of People And Houses. Haus der Architektur. Graz. Styria, Austria
- 2009 Of People And Houses. Galerija Herman Pečarič. Piran, Eslovenia
- 2008 Enanitos Toreros. Powerhouse Arena. Brooklyn, NY, USA

== Honors and awards ==
- 2000 30 under 30. Winner. Photo District News (PDN) . New York, NY, USA
- 2000 BMW Inziniere Kraft, Prize for Young Photographers. Munich, Germany
- 2000 9th term honors, Art Center College of Design. USA
- 2001 Clement Mok Workshop Award, Art Center College of Design. USA
- 2003 International Photography Awards. Winner. USA
- 2005 Lente de Plata, Winner. Acapulco, Gro., Mexico
- 2006 Mentioned in Communication Arts. USA
- 2006 Mentioned in PDN Photo Annual. USA
- 2006 New Photographers Showcase, Honorable mention for Two Million Homes for Mexico. Cannes, France.
- 2008 The REAL Photography Award, Honorable mention for Two Million Homes for Mexico. ING, Rotterdam, The Netherlands
- 2008 Sony World Photography, Architecture Category. Winner for Two Million Homes for Mexico. Cannes, France
- 2008 International Photography Award, Architecture Category. Winner for Two Million Homes for Mexico. USA
- 2008 International Photographer of the Year, Lucie Foundation Awards. Nominee for Two Million Homes for Mexico. USA
- 2008 XIII Bienal de Fotografía, Honorable mention for Two Million Homes for Mexico. Mexico City, Mexico.
- 2009 Photo España 2009. Official selection. Madrid, Spain
- 2009 John Simon Guggenheim Fellowship for Two Million Homes for Mexico. New York, NY. USA
- 2010 Winner of Julia Margaret Cameron Award. USA
- 2010 KLM Paul Huf, Foam Fotografiemuseum. Nominee. Amsterdam, the Netherlands
- 2012 Prix Pictet Nominee . United Kingdom
- 2012–2014 Sistema Nacional de Creadores de Arte of the Fondo Nacional para la Cultura y las Artes. Grant awardee for Nadie Sabe, Nadie Supo – Entre la S.E.P. y la CONASUPO. CONACULTA, Mexico
- 2013 Prix Pictet Nominee. United Kingdom
- 2015–2017 Sistema Nacional de Creadores de Arte of the Fondo Nacional para la Cultura y las Artes. Grant awardee for .925, Auges y Declives de la Plata Mexicana. CONACULTA, Mexico
