= Krona =

Krona may refer to:

== Monetary units ==
- Faroese króna
- Icelandic króna
- Swedish krona

== Other uses ==
- Krona (character), alien villain in DC Comics
- Krona space object recognition station, Russian military satellite detection station in Zelenchukskaya
- Krona-N the second Krona satellite detection station, in Nakhodka

== See also ==
- Krone (disambiguation)
- Koruna (disambiguation)
