= Corona Line =

Corona Line was refer to:

- IRT Flushing Line, part of the New York City Subway
- Corona Line (surface), bus, formerly streetcar transit line
- Corona Line (shipping company), defunct shipping company operating on the Baltic Sea between 1992 and 1995
- Corona Line (Colorado), former rail line over Corona Pass before the Moffat Tunnel was built
- A spectral line in the Sun's corona due to highly ionized elements
