= Bernard Krone Holding =

German heavy equipment manufacturer

Bernard Krone Holding SE & Co. KG
- Type: SE & Co. KG
- Industry: Heavy equipment
- Founded: 1906
- Founder: Bernhard Krone; Anna Krone
- Headquarters: Spelle, Germany
- Number of locations: 109 Countries
- Key people: David Frink (CEO Group); Stefan Binnewies (COO); Ole Klose (CFO) Advisory Board: Bernard Krone (Chair); Alfons Veer (Deputy Chairman); Philip Freiherr von dem Bussche; Wilhelm-Friedrich Holtgrave; Bernd Meerpohl; Tono Nasch
- Products: agricultural machinery, semi-trailers, trailers, box vehicles, swap systems and others
- Revenue: ▲€2.5bn (2022)
- Operating income: ▲€84.6M (2022)
- Net income: ▼€64.6M (2022)
- Total assets: ▲€1.7bn (2022)
- Total equity: ▲€701.6M (2022)
- Number of employees: 5,768 (2022)
- Website: krone-group.com

Bernard Krone Holding SE & Co. KG is an agricultural technology and commercial vehicle manufacturer based in Spelle in the Emsland district, Lower Saxony. The company acts as the parent company and corporate headquarters of the Krone Group. The Krone Group is wholly owned by the Krone family.

== History ==
=== Founding and early years ===
In 1906, Bernhard Krone and his wife Anna Krone established a farm-based blacksmith shop for horseshoeing and repair work. Subsequently, Krone secured the distribution rights for Heinrich Lanz AG within the Emsland district and began to develop and market its own agricultural machinery. With the development of a patented animal-operated pasture trough, the company assumed its role as both distributor and manufacturer of agricultural equipment. Post-World War II, Krone started to produce tractor wagons. In 1963, a separate factory was built in Werlte for the production of trailers.

In the late 1950s, Bernard Krone I, the son of the company's founder, invented the Optimat manure spreader, which was intended to make agricultural field work easier.

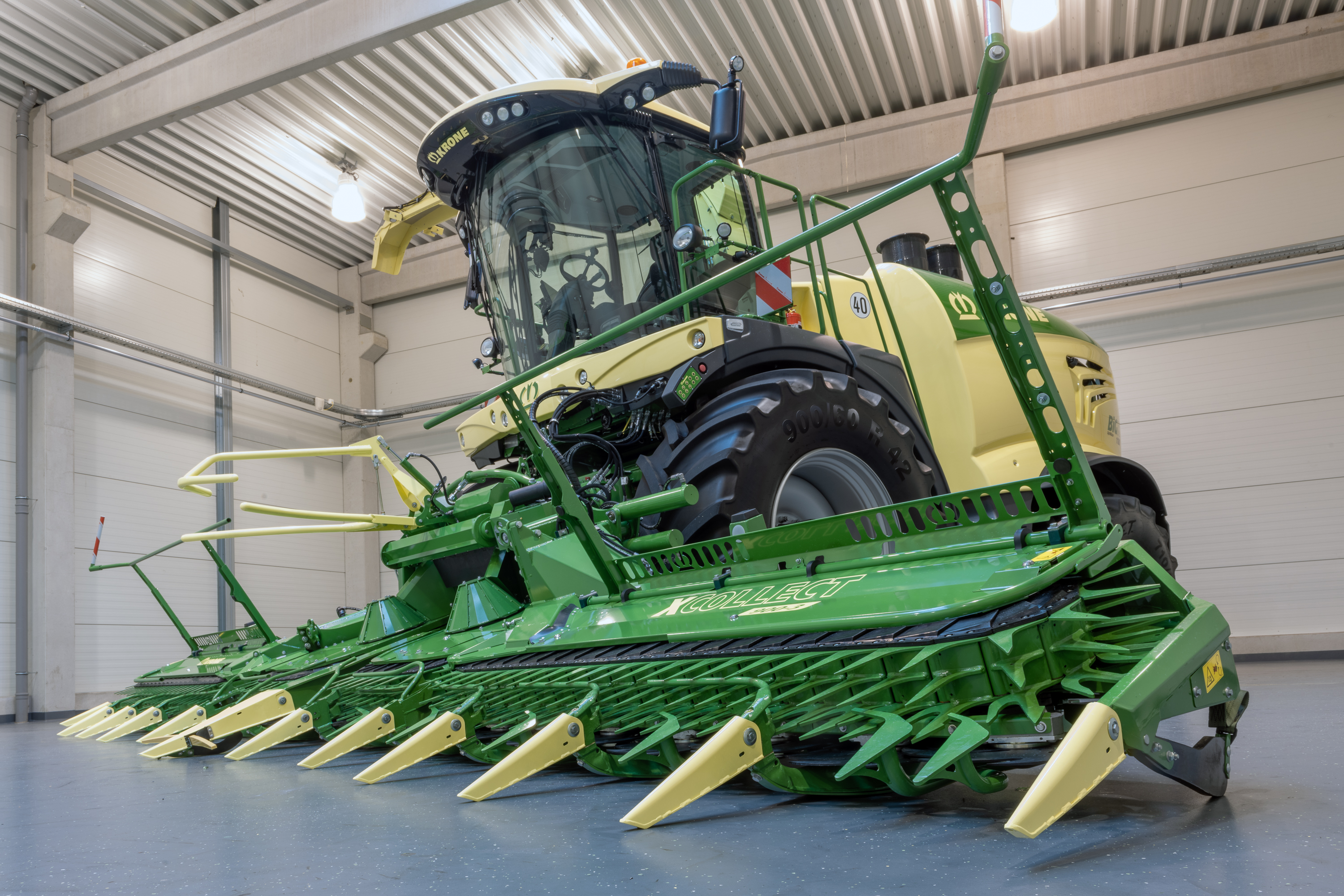
KRONE BiG X 1180

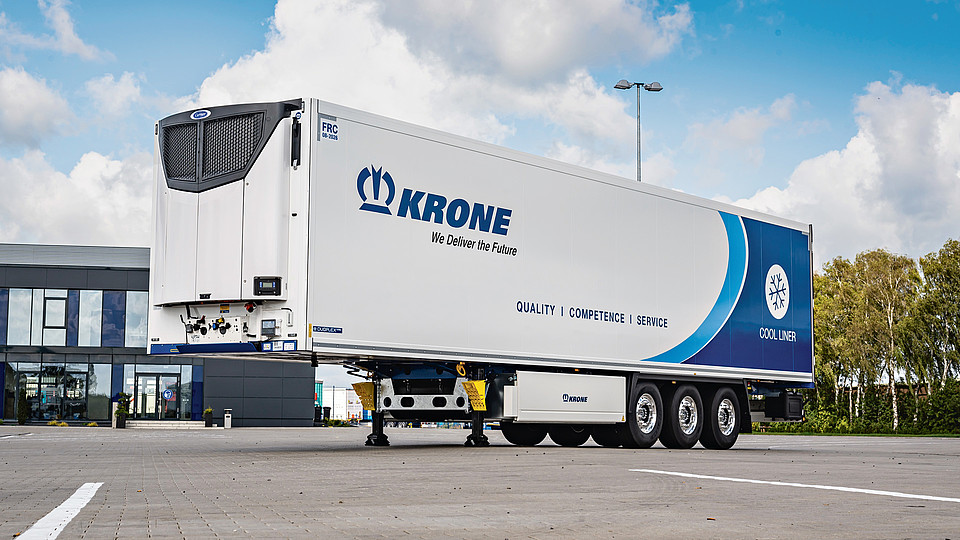
KRONE Cool Liner

=== Expansion in Germany and abroad ===
In 1963, the Bernard Krone company moved part of its agricultural machinery production to a 5-hectare industrial site in Werlte. The background to the company move was an order for the construction of 20 three-axle trailers. In the same year, the company commenced building its production halls and manufacturing agricultural machinery.

At the end of the 1960s, demand for Krone agricultural machinery decreased due to a diminishing number of farmers in Germany. In response to this shift, Bernard Krone II decided, together with his cousins Heinz and Walter Krone, to build truck trailers and semi-trailers for the commercial vehicle industry.

After his father's death in 1970, Bernard Krone III took over, and the company started producing trailers and semi-trailers for transporting goods on the road. As sales and profits stagnated in the beginning of the 1980s, Krone hired external consulting firms to get to the bottom of the reason for the economic downturn. The consultants recommended separating the vehicle factory and machine factory divisions, whereupon the corporate divisions Fahrzeugwerk Bernard Krone GmbH & Co. KG (Krone Commercial Vehicle SE) in Werlte and Maschinenfabrik Bernard Krone GmbH & Co. KG (Krone Agriculture SE) in Spelle were founded. Krone also received a recommendation to purchase as many components and services as possible from external suppliers. As a result, Krone handed over the production of chassis for truck trailers and semi-trailers to suppliers. Since 1980, Metallbau Schmees GmbH in Lower Saxony has been Krone's supplier for assemblies, main beams and chassis as well as several individual parts. Metallbau Schmees delivers 80 percent of the pieces produced to the Krone factory in Werlte. In addition to German companies, Krone works with suppliers from Slovakia.

Brüggen Oberflächen- und Systemlieferant GmbH began working for Krone in 1984. By 2003, 95 percent of the company's orders came from Krone. In addition to coating chassis, Brüggen builds rear portals and front walls for Krone.

In the 1999 financial year, Krone Holding generated a revenue of DM 231 million.

=== Acquisitions and realignment ===
In 2007, Bernard Krone, the fourth generation of the family, joined the company's management.

In 2007, Krone began building a new assembly plant including a paint shop in Istanbul for €30 million, to produce agricultural machinery and trailers. In the 2006/07 financial year, Krone generated a revenue of €1.2 billion.

Until July 31, 2011, the Krone Group was organizationally divided into three areas: commercial vehicles (Fahrzeugwerk Bernard Krone), agricultural technology (Maschinenfabrik Bernard Krone), and Bernard Krone agricultural technology sales and services (LVD). On August 1, 2011, the company's agricultural technology sales and services (LVD) was spun off from Bernard Krone Holding. The Krone family continues to own LVD.

From 2011 to 2014, the machine factory in Spelle was renovated for €40 million. In addition to a new technology center and a testing hall, a new logistics and training facility and a new assembly hall for forage harvesters were built. In 2012, a production site for the commercial vehicle division was opened in Tire, Turkey, where Krone produces chassis for containers and trailers for the Turkish market as well as for export to North Africa and the Middle East. In the 2012 financial year, Krone generated a revenue of €1.4 billion.

In 2013, Krone took over the Dinklage based axle manufacturer Gigant. At the end of 2015, Krone put a new foam system for panel production into operation. Between 2015 and 2020, the vehicle factory in Werlte was renovated for €50 million. In particular, the painting system and the assembly were modified. In 2016, the two Emsland-based vehicle manufacturers Krone and Brüggen Group merged under the umbrella of the Krone Commercial Vehicle SE. In addition, the previous subsidiaries Gigant Achsen, Krone Used, the trailer factory in Turkey and the foreign sales companies were integrated into the new Krone Commercial Vehicle SE. In the same year, Krone founded the subsidiary Krone SAS in Saint-Arnoult-en-Yvelines, France on a 1.6 hectare area. In 2017, Krone built a spare parts center in Herzlake for €8 million. €39 million were spent on the construction of a new painting system in the Fahrzeugwerk Bernard Krone in Werlte. Also in 2017, the Krone Group founded the startup Rytle with the Bremen consulting company Orbitak, which produces electric-powered cargo bikes that can be used to transport goods in cities.

=== Recent developments ===
In 2019, Krone opened the administration building Krone Business Center GmbH & Co. KG for the areas of IT and AP. In the same year, the Krone Group took over 100 percent of the shares of the Dutch Knapen Group, Deurne, and its subsidiaries.

From 2019 to 2021, Krone built a €20 million test center called "Future Lab" on an area of 13 hectares in Lingen. In addition to a machine hall with workshops and a test hall with test stands and offices, the center includes a test track on which the behavior of truck trailers and agricultural machinery on the road is tested. In 2022, Krone launched the electrified eTrailer, which is meant to reduce CO_{2} emissions by 20 to 40 percent. In the same year, Bernard Krone III passed away.

== Corporate structure ==
Bernard Krone Holding SE & Co. KG is the parent company of the Krone Group. The family business is solely owned by the Krone family.

In the 2020/21 financial year, the company had 5,768 employees and generated a revenue of €2.5 billion.

The holding company consists of two judicially independent companies, Krone Commercial Vehicle SE and Krone Agriculture SE. The Krone Commercial Vehicle Group operates production facilities at a total of four locations. The Fahrzeugwerk Bernard Krone GmbH & Co. KG in Werlte, the Brüggen Oberflächen- und Systemlieferant GmbH in Herzlake and the Brüggen Fahrzeugwerk & Service GmbH in Lübtheen represent the German production sites of the commercial vehicles division. Krone Ticari Araçlar San. ve Tic. A.Ş. in Tire in Turkey is the company's fourth production facility.

== Products ==
=== Krone Commercial Vehicle SE ===
The Brüggen company manufactures swap systems and so-called dry freight boxes at the Herzlake location, while refrigerated semi-trailers are produced in Lübtheen. The Fahrzeugwerk Bernard Krone in Werlte produces curtainsider trailers, flatbed semi-trailers and container chassis, swap body and building material trailers, long trucks and dry freight box chassis. Axles for commercial vehicles are manufactured at the Dinklage site. Flatbed semi-trailers and container chassis are produced in Tire in Turkey, while moving floor trailers for the European market are manufactured at the Deurne site in the Netherlands.

=== Krone Agriculture SE ===
The Krone Agriculture SE focuses on forage harvesting technology. Through Speller Maschinenfabrik, Krone sells machines to farmers and contractors through their dealer network. Machines on offer include disc mowers, rotary tedders, round bale and large pack presses as well as loading and transport wagons. The flagships of the program are two self-propelled machines, the Big M mower-conditioner and the BiG X forage harvester. In 2018, Krone expanded the Big X series with the Big X 1180 forage harvester, which has 1,156 hp.

Krone Agriculture machines are sold worldwide through subsidiaries in North America, Europe and China. In addition to sales and services, the Tianjin location in China also carries out assembly work. In North America, the products sold to contractors and farmers are the mower conditioners and forage harvesters, Krone Big M and Big X. At the Spelle location in Germany, Krone is investing in robot-assisted processing technology and in the digitalization of agricultural machinery.

== Awards ==
- 2015: Gold medal for the mobile pellet harvester "Premos 5000" from the German Agricultural Society (DLG)
- 2017: Innovations Award in silver for the “LiftCab” lift cabin of the "Big X" 70 centimeters by a jury appointed by the German Agricultural Society (DLG)
