= Koruna (Svitavy District) =

- Municipality
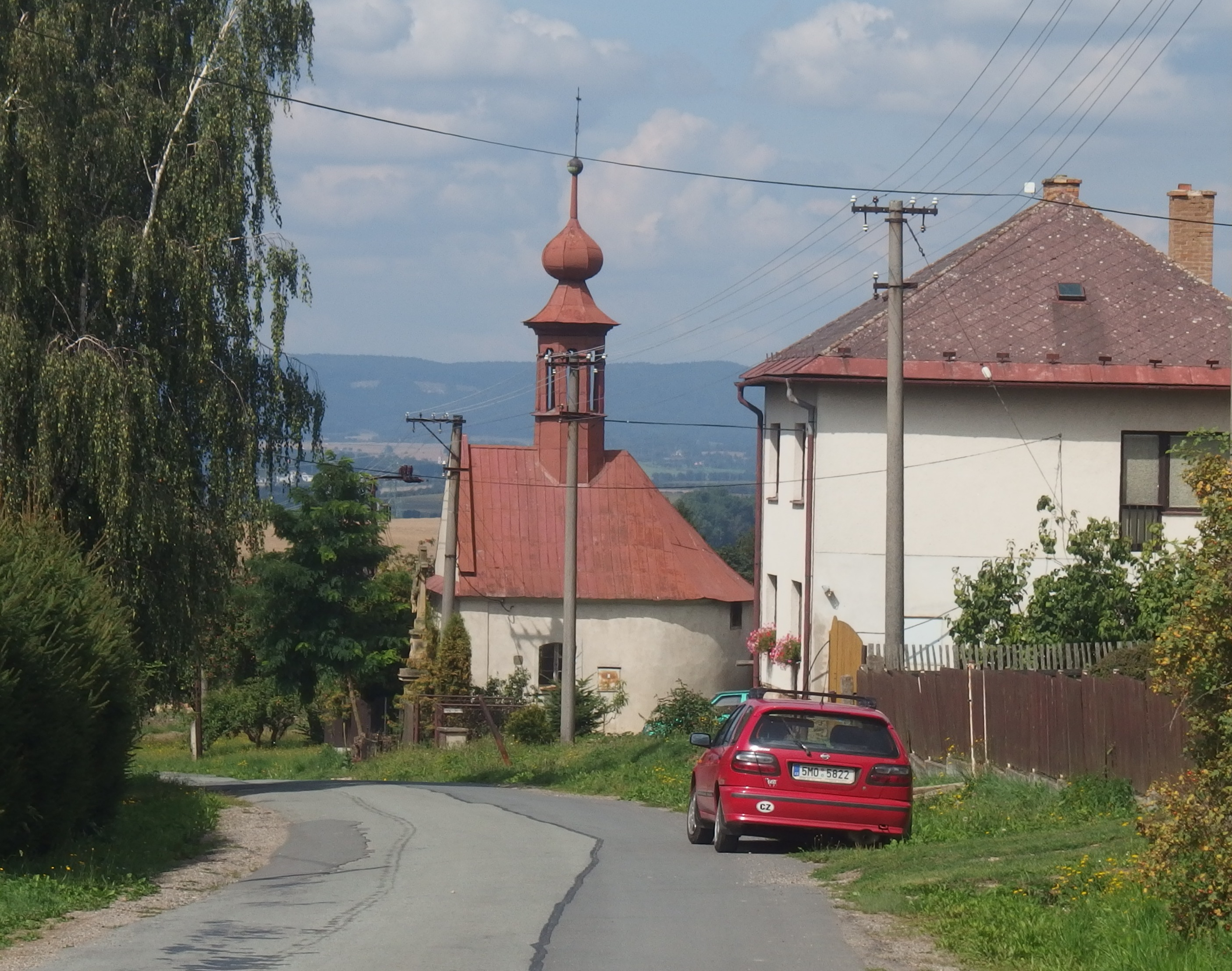
- Chapel of the Assumption of the Virgin Mary

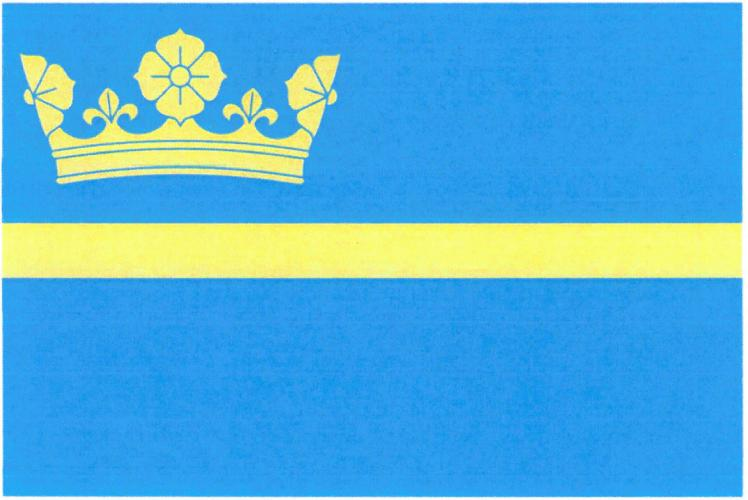
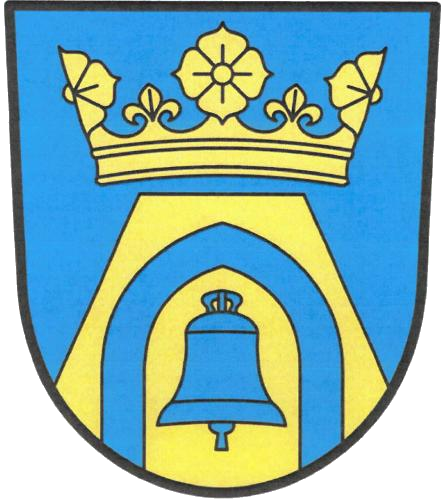
- Flag Coat of arms

- Location in the Czech Republic
- Coordinates: 49°50′49″N 16°42′54″E
- Country: Czech Republic
- Region: Pardubice
- District: Svitavy
- Founded: 1771

Area
  - Total: 2.05 km^{2} (0.79 sq mi)
- Elevation: 410 m (1,350 ft)

Population (2026-01-01)
  - Total: 167
  - Density: 81.5/km^{2} (211/sq mi)
- Time zone: UTC+1 (CET)
  - Summer (DST): UTC+2 (CEST)
- Postal code: 563 01
- Website: www.obec-koruna.cz

Koruna is a municipality and village in Svitavy District in the Pardubice Region of the Czech Republic. It has about 200 inhabitants.

Koruna lies approximately 21 kilometres (13 mi) north-east of Svitavy, 71 km (44 mi) east of Pardubice, and 167 km (104 mi) east of Prague.

== Demographics ==
Historical population
Year	Pop.	±%
1869	269	—
1880	252	−6.3%
1890	241	−4.4%
1900	254	+5.4%
1910	226	−11.0%
1921	200	−11.5%
1930	235	+17.5%
1950	259	+10.2%
1961	236	−8.9%
1970	205	−13.1%
1980	151	−26.3%
1991	122	−19.2%
2001	132	+8.2%
2011	136	+3.0%
2021	144	+5.9%
Source: Censuses
