= Solar2D =

Software development kit

Solar 2D
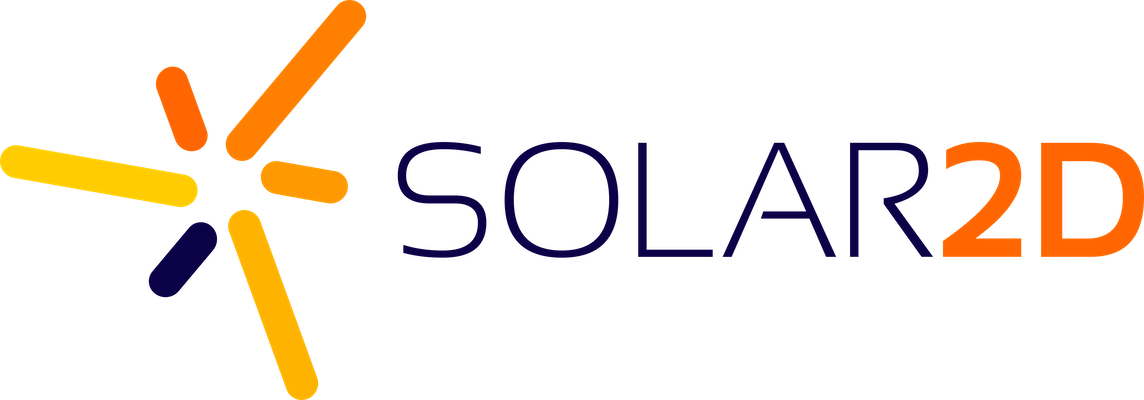
- Developers: Vlad Shcherban, Corona Labs Inc.
- Release: 1.0 / December 2009; 16 years ago
- Stable release: 2026.3730 / May 7, 2026; 6 months ago
- Written in: Lua (Corona API)
- Operating system: macOS (creation and deployment); Windows (creation and deployment); Linux (creation and deployment); iPhone/iPad (deployment); tvOS (deployment); Android (deployment); Kindle Fire (deployment); Android TV (deployment); Nintendo Switch (deployment); HTML5 (deployment)
- Available in: English; Russian
- Type: Software development kit Game engine
- License: MIT License
- Website: solar2d.com
- Repository: github.com/coronalabs/corona

Solar2D (formerly Corona SDK) is a free and open-source, cross-platform software development kit originally developed by Corona Labs Inc. and now maintained by Vlad Shcherban. Released in late 2009, it allows software programmers to build 2D mobile applications for iOS, Android, and Kindle, desktop applications for Windows, Linux and macOS, and connected TV applications for Apple TV, Fire TV and Android TV.

Solar2D uses integrated Lua layered on top of C++/OpenGL to build graphic applications. The software has two operational modes: the Solar2D Simulator and Solar2D Native. With the Solar2D Simulator, apps are built directly from the Solar2D Simulator. Solar2D Native allows the integration of Lua code and assets within an Xcode or Android Studio project to build apps and include native features.

== History ==
Walter Luh and Carlos Icaza started Ansca Mobile, later renamed Corona Labs, after departing from Adobe in 2007. At Adobe, Luh was the lead architect working on the Flash Lite team and Icaza was the engineering manager responsible for mobile Flash authoring. In June 2009, Ansca released the first Corona SDK beta free for early adopters.

In December 2009, Ansca launched Corona SDK 1.0 for iPhone. The following February, the Corona SDK 1.1 was released with additional features.

In September 2010, Ansca released version 2.0 of Corona SDK and added Corona Game Edition. Version 2.0 added cross-platform support for iPad and Android, while Game Edition added a physics engine and other advanced features aimed specifically at game development.

In January 2011, Corona SDK was released for Windows XP and newer, giving developers the opportunity to build Android applications on PC.

In April 2012, co-founder and CEO Icaza left Ansca, and CTO Luh took the CEO role. Shortly after, in June 2012, Ansca changed its name to Corona Labs. In August 2012, Corona Labs announced Enterprise Edition, which added native bindings for Objective-C.

In March 2015, during GDC 2015 announcement was made that Corona SDK is completely free and will support Windows and Mac OS X deployment targets.

In November 2015, Corona Labs Inc. announced support for tvOS development for Apple TV.

In March 2017, Corona Labs was acquired by Appodeal and announced that the Enterprise version of Corona would also become free.

In June 2017, Corona Labs announced that Enterprise was renamed to Corona Native, is free for everyone and included as part of the core product."

In January 2019, Corona Labs announced that Corona 2D will be open sourced under the GNU GPLv3 license, while offering the option of a commercial license upon agreement with Corona Labs.

In April 2020, the engine was renamed from Corona SDK to Solar2D. This was done in response to the closure of Corona Labs, as well as the COVID-19 pandemic. Corona Labs also stopped offering commercial licenses and changed its open source license from GPLv3 to the more permissive MIT License.

== Major features ==
Solar2D's API suite features API calls for audio and graphics, cryptography, networking and device information such as accelerometer information, GPS, and user input as well as widgets, particle effects, and more.

== Bibliography ==
- Zammetti, Frank (April 2013). Learn Game Development with Corona SDK (1st ed.). Apress. p. 288. ISBN 978-1430250685.
- Flanagan, Nevin (May 2013). Corona SDK Hotshot (1st ed.). Packt Publishing. p. 334. ISBN 978-1849694308.
- Whye, J.A. (June 2013). Mobile Game Development with Corona SDK Training Video (1st ed.). Infinite Skills.
- Burton, Ed.D., Brian (April 2012). Learning Mobile Application & Game Development with Corona SDK (1st ed.). Burtons Media Group.
- Fernandez, Michelle (April 2012). Corona SDK Mobile Game Development: Beginner's Guide (1st ed.). Packt Publishing. p. 408. ISBN 978-1849691888.
- Burton, Ed.D., Brian. Mobile App Development with Corona (1st ed.). Burtons Media Group. p. 436. ISBN 978-1-937336-00-4. Archived from the original on 2012-06-26.
