= Fabrizio Corona =

Italian entrepreneur, media personality, paparazzo and criminal

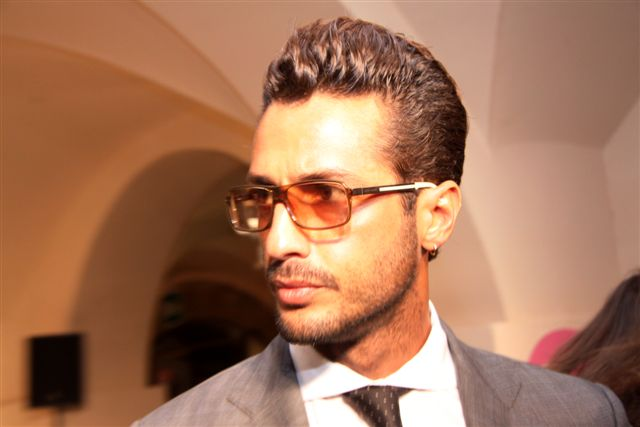
- Fabrizio Corona in 2009
- Born: 29 March 1974 (age 52); Catania, Italy
- Known for: Media personality; photographic agent; entrepreneur
- Height: 1.84 m (6 ft 0 in)
- Spouse: Nina Morić (m. 2001–2007)
- Partner: Belén Rodríguez (2009–12)
- Children: Carlos Maria Corona (b. 2002)

Fabrizio Maria Corona (born 29 March 1974) is an Italian media personality and entrepreneur.

He is a former partner and director of Corona's, a photographic agency in Milan. He was involved in the Vallettopoli scandal, in which politicians, celebrities and socialites were photographed in potentially embarrassing situations (often sexual in nature) and extorted funds to ensure the photos were not made public. In 2015 he was sentenced by the Italian Supreme Court to 13 years and 2 months' imprisonment.

== Career ==
Corona was born in Catania, Sicily to a family of journalists, the son of Vittorio and Gabriella Corona. He has two brothers, Francesco and Federico.

A former partner and administrator of Corona's, a photographic agency in Milan, Corona was the central figure in a series of investigations into the 2007 extortion scandal known as Vallettopoli, which involved many celebrities in the entertainment business and sports. He was arrested and spent 77 days in prison; however, on 29 May 2007, he was released but placed under house arrest. He wrote a book, La mia Prigione (My Prison), about his experiences as a result of the Vallettopoli scandal which received much attention from the Italian media.

In March 2009, he was a participant in the reality show La fattoria. Corona made his acting debut in May 2010 in the television drama series Squadra antimafia - Palermo oggi 2 which was broadcast on Mediaset's Canale 5 in the role of Mafia boss Ivo Principe, nicknamed Catanese.

Also, in 2009, he was charged over blackmail photos. In 2013 he was sentenced to five years' imprisonment, became a fugitive but finally gave himself up after four days.

Corona also appeared as himself in Erik Gandini's expository documentary, Videocracy, in which his relationships with political and television industry moguls such as Lele Mora and Silvio Berlusconi are explored. He discusses his business, jail time, and celebrity as well.

Corona appeared in photographs advertising the 2010 collection of a line of designer watches.

Corona collaborated with Maurizio Mian on creating a reality television show, I Magnifici Cinque (English: The Magnificent Five). In 2017 Corona stated in one of his court appearances that Mian had paid him €1.7m to promote the "crazy" project.

In 2015 he was definitively sentenced by the Italian Supreme Court to 13 years and 2 months' imprisonment for crimes for which he was previously convicted. In December 2019, he was placed under house arrest on medical grounds. In March 2021, a court in Milan ordered his return to prison. From May 2022 he served the rest of his sentence in a therapeutic community in Limbiate, and he was released in September 2023 after being granted early release. In September 2026 he pleaded guilty to the bankruptcy of his company Fenice. He was sentenced to 10 months which was paid with a fine of 90.000 euros.

== Personal life ==
From January 2009 to April 2012 Corona was romantically involved with Argentine showgirl and model Belén Rodríguez which attracted much gossip and publicity.

From his former marriage to Croatian model Nina Morić, Fabrizio Corona has one son, Carlos Maria Corona, who was born in 2002.

== See also ==
- Trials and allegations involving Silvio Berlusconi
