= Crown (disambiguation) =

A crown is an emblem of a monarchy, a monarch's government, or items endorsed by it.

Crown or The Crown may also refer to:

== Arts and media ==
=== Music ===
==== Groups ====
- Carolina Crown Drum and Bugle Corps, a junior drum corps from South Carolina
- Crown the Empire, an American metalcore band
- Crowns (band), an English folk punk band
- The Crown (band), a Swedish death/thrash band

==== Albums ====
- Crown (Aja album), a 2021 album by Aja
- The Crown (Z-Ro album), 2014
- The Crown (Ledisi album), 2025

==== Songs ====
- "Crown" (Azealia Banks song) (2017)
- "Crown" (Exo song) (2026)
- "Crown" (Stormzy song) (2019)
- "Crown" (TXT song) (2019)
- "Crown", a song by Alien Weaponry from Te Rā
- "Crown", a song by Camila Cabello and Grey from Bright: The Album
- "Crown", a song by Jay-Z from Magna Carta Holy Grail
- "Crown", a song by Kelly Rowland
- "Crown", a song by Kendrick Lamar from Mr. Morale & the Big Steppers
- "Crown", a song by NEFFEX
- "Crown", a song by Run the Jewels from Run the Jewels 2
- "Crown", a song by Seulgi from 28 Reasons
- "Crown", a song by Gigi Perez from At the Beach, in Every Life
- "The Crown", a song by Gary Byrd and the GB Experience
- "The Crown", a song by Gaza from No Absolutes in Human Suffering
- "Crowns", a song by Phinehas from Thegodmachine

=== Other uses in arts and media ===
- Crown, the symbol for the Special Cup in the Mario Kart franchise
- Crown (manga), a Japanese comic series
- The Crown (TV series), about Queen Elizabeth II
- "The Crown: Joancoming: It's a Cleo Cleo Cleo Cleo World", an episode of Clone High about Cleopatra
- Crown Hotel (Mona Lisa Black Background), a 1982 painting by Jean-Michel Basquiat

== Brands and enterprises ==
- Crown (St. Paul's Churchyard), a historical bookseller in London
- Crown Equipment Corporation, an American manufacturer of forklifts
- Crown International (Crown Audio), an American manufacturer of audio electronics
- Crown International Pictures, a defunct American film company
- Crown Lager, an Australian beer
- Crown Liquor Saloon, a pub in Belfast
- Crown, an imprint of Crown Publishing Group
- Crown Royal, a Canadian whisky
- Crowns brand cigarettes, produced by Commonwealth Brands
- Crown Resorts, a hotel, casino, and resort company

== Currency ==
=== Currencies ===
- Crown (currency)

==== Contemporary currencies ====
- Czech koruna
- Danish krone
- Faroese króna
- Icelandic króna
- Norwegian krone
- Swedish krona

==== Historical currencies ====
- Austrian krone
- Austro-Hungarian krone
- Bohemian and Moravian koruna
- Czechoslovak koruna
- Estonian kroon
- Hungarian korona
- Slovak koruna

=== Historical coins ===
- Crown (Australian coin)
- Crown (British coin), a British coin introduced in 1707
- Crown (English coin), an English coin introduced in 1526
- Crown, the French Écu
- Crown, the 5 Mark coin of the German gold mark

== Dentistry ==
- Crown (dental restoration), a dental treatment
- Crown (tooth part), a portion of a tooth

== Monarchy and government ==
- Crown (heraldry), a depiction of a crown used in heraldry
- Crown, by metonymy, the term for a monarch or the form of government of a monarchy
  - The Crown, the legal embodiment of monarchical governance in a realm of the Commonwealth of Nations
    - Crown prosecutor, the state prosecutor in the Commonwealth of Nations jurisdictions
  - Crown Estate, a collection of lands and holdings in the territories of England, Wales and Northern Ireland belonging to the British monarch as a corporation sole
- Crown Property Bureau, the quasi-government agency responsible for managing the property of the Monarchy of Thailand
- Crown Prince or Princess, a title

=== Ancient Roman awards ===
- Camp crown, in penetrating a camp
- Civic Crown, of a citizen
- Grass Crown, of a city
- Mural crown, in scaling city walls
- Naval crown, in boarding an enemy ship

== Places and buildings ==
=== Australian casinos and resorts ===
- Crown Melbourne
- Crown Perth
- Crown Sydney

=== Pubs ===
- Pub names
- Crown Hotel, Harrogate, North Yorkshire, England
- Crown Hotel, Liverpool, Merseyside, England
- Crown Hotel, Nantwich, Cheshire, England
- Crown Hotel, Poole, Dorset, England
- Crown Hotel, Sydney, New South Wales, Australia
- Crown Hotel (Siloam Springs, Arkansas), U.S.
- Crown Inn, Glossop, Derbyshire, England
- Crown Inn, Helmsley, North Yorkshire, England
- Crown Regency Hotel and Towers, Cebu City, Philippines
- Crown Spa Hotel, formerly Crown Hotel, Scarborough, North Yorkshire, England
- Crowne Plaza, a hotel chain
  - Crowne Plaza Liverpool John Lennon Airport Hotel, Merseyside, England
- The Crown (hotel), Amersham, Buckinghamshire, England
- The Crown, Bristol, a historic pub in England
- The Crown, Covent Garden, a pub in London
- The Crown, Cowley, a pub in London
- The Crown, Heaton Mersey, a pub in Stockport, Greater Manchester, England
- The Crown, Houghton Regis, a pub in Bedfordshire, England
- The Crown, Islington, a pub in London
- The Crown, Salford, a former pub in Greater Manchester, England
- The Crown, Shoreditch, now The Owl and Pussycat, a pub in London
- The Crown, Strand, later the Crown and Anchor, a tavern in 18th–19th-century London
- The Crown, Twickenham, a pub in London
- The Crown Inn, Birmingham, West Midlands, England
- The Crown Inn, Pishill, Oxfordshire, England
- The Three Crowns Hotel, Chagford, Devon, England

=== Suburbs in South Africa ===
- Crown, Gauteng, a suburb of Johannesburg
- Crown North, a suburb of Johannesburg
- Crown Gardens, a suburb of Johannesburg

=== Other places and buildings ===
- The Crown (mountain), a mountain in the Karakoram of China
- Crown, Inverness, an area beside the city centre of Inverness, Scotland
- Crown, Missouri, a community in the United States
- The Crown, Cincinnati, now Heritage Bank Center, an indoor arena in Cincinnati, Ohio
- Crown, Pennsylvania, a census-designated place in Farmington Township
- The Crown Inn, later The Flying Pig, a pub in Cambridge, England
- Crown Theatre, Wollongong, an historic theatre in Wollongong, NSW, Australia
- Crown Theatre, a theatre within the Crown Perth complex
- Crown Wetlands, Cayman Islands

== Vehicles ==
- Crown (automobile), a 1905 American automobile
- Ford Crown Victoria
- Ford LTD Crown Victoria
- Pacer Crown, a show car by AMC
- Toyota Crown, a luxury vehicle from Toyota

=== Ships ===
- Crown (1793 ship)
- MS Albatros or Crown, a cruise ship
- HMS Crown, a list of Royal Navy ships
  - HMS Crown (1660), a 48-gun ship launched as Taunton in 1654
  - HMS Crown (1782), a 64-gun third rate

== Science ==
- Crown (head), the top of the head
- Crown (botany), the branching leaf-bearing portion of a tree
- Crown ether, a cyclic chemical compound that consists of a ring containing several ether groups
- Crown gear or crown
- Crown group, the most recent common ancestor of a collection of species as well as all of that ancestor's descendants
- Hair whorl or crown

== Other uses ==
- Confederation of the Polish Crown, or The Crown, monarchist political party in Poland
- Crown, the cross-sectional shape of a road surface
- Crown, part of the muzzle of a gun barrel
- Crown, the top or hinge of a bell
- Crown, the topmost part of a hat
- Crown (arch), the top portion of an arch
- Crown (surname), a surname
- Crown (watch), the grooved knob or dial on the outside of a watch case
- Crown cap, a type of bottle seal
- Crown graph, a type of undirected graph in graph theory
- Crowns, a play by Regina Taylor

== See also ==
- Corona (disambiguation)
- Crowne
- Crown Point (disambiguation)
