= Crown (surname) =

Crown is a surname. Notable people with the surname include:

- David Crown (born 1958), English footballer
- Frank Crown, American stamp collector
- Gordon Crown (1929–1947), British chess player
- Henry Crown (1896–1990), American businessman
- James Crown (1953–2023), American businessman
- John Crown (born 1957), Irish consultant oncologist and politician
- Johnny Crown (born 1997), Nigerian-American Afrobeats and hiphop singer and rapper
- June Crown (born 1938), British public health specialist
- Katie Crown (born 1985), Canadian voice actress and television writer
- Keith Crown (1918–2010), American abstract painter and Professor of Art
- Laurie Crown (1898–1984), English footballer
- Lester Crown (born 1925), American businessman
- Robert Crown (1753–1841), British and Russian naval officer
- Robert W. Crown (1922–1973), American politician and soldier

== See also ==
- Crowne
- Murder of Una Crown
- The Thomas Crown Affair
