= Crown Point =

Crown Point is the name of several places:

== Australia ==
- Crown Point Station, a pastoral lease in the Northern Territory, Australia

== Trinidad and Tobago ==
- Crown Point, Tobago, an area on the island of Tobago in Trinidad and Tobago
- Crown Point Airport, the former name of the Arthur Napoleon Raymond Robinson International Airport that serves the island of Tobago

== United Kingdom ==
- Crown Point, Norwich, England
  - Crown Point TMD, railway depot in Norwich, England
- Crown Point, a district and community in South London, England
- Crown Point, Denton, the crossroads of the A57 (Hyde Road) and A6017 (Stockport Road)

== United States ==
=== Communities ===
Listed alphabetically by state

- Crown Point, Alaska, a census-designated place in Kenai Peninsula Borough
- Crown Point, an area of Westminster, Colorado
- Crown Point, Indiana, a city in Lake County
- Crown Point, Louisiana, an unincorporated community in Jefferson Parish
- Crown Point, New York, a town in Essex County
- Crown Point, Oregon (disambiguation), several places

=== Geographical features ===
- Crown Point (Sierra Nevada), a mountain in California
- Crown Point (Oregon), a basalt promontory on the Columbia River Gorge
- Crown Point, California, extends into Mission Bay, San Diego—see Pacific Beach, San Diego
- Crown Point Formation, in the states of New York and Vermont

== Other uses ==
- Battle of Crown Point, occurred during the American Revolutionary War
- Crown Point Press, a printmaking workshop in San Francisco
- USS Crown Point, some ships of the U.S. Navy that were given other names prior to launch
