= Lakeside Hotel =

Lakeside Hotel may refer to:

- Crown Hotel (Siloam Springs, Arkansas), U.S., formerly Lakeside Hotel
- QT Canberra, Australia, formerly Lakeside Hotel
- Ein Schloß am Wörthersee, a German–Austrian comedy TV series, known internationally as Lakeside Hotel
