= Stockton Building =

- U.S. National Register of Historic Places
- U.S. Historic district – Contributing property
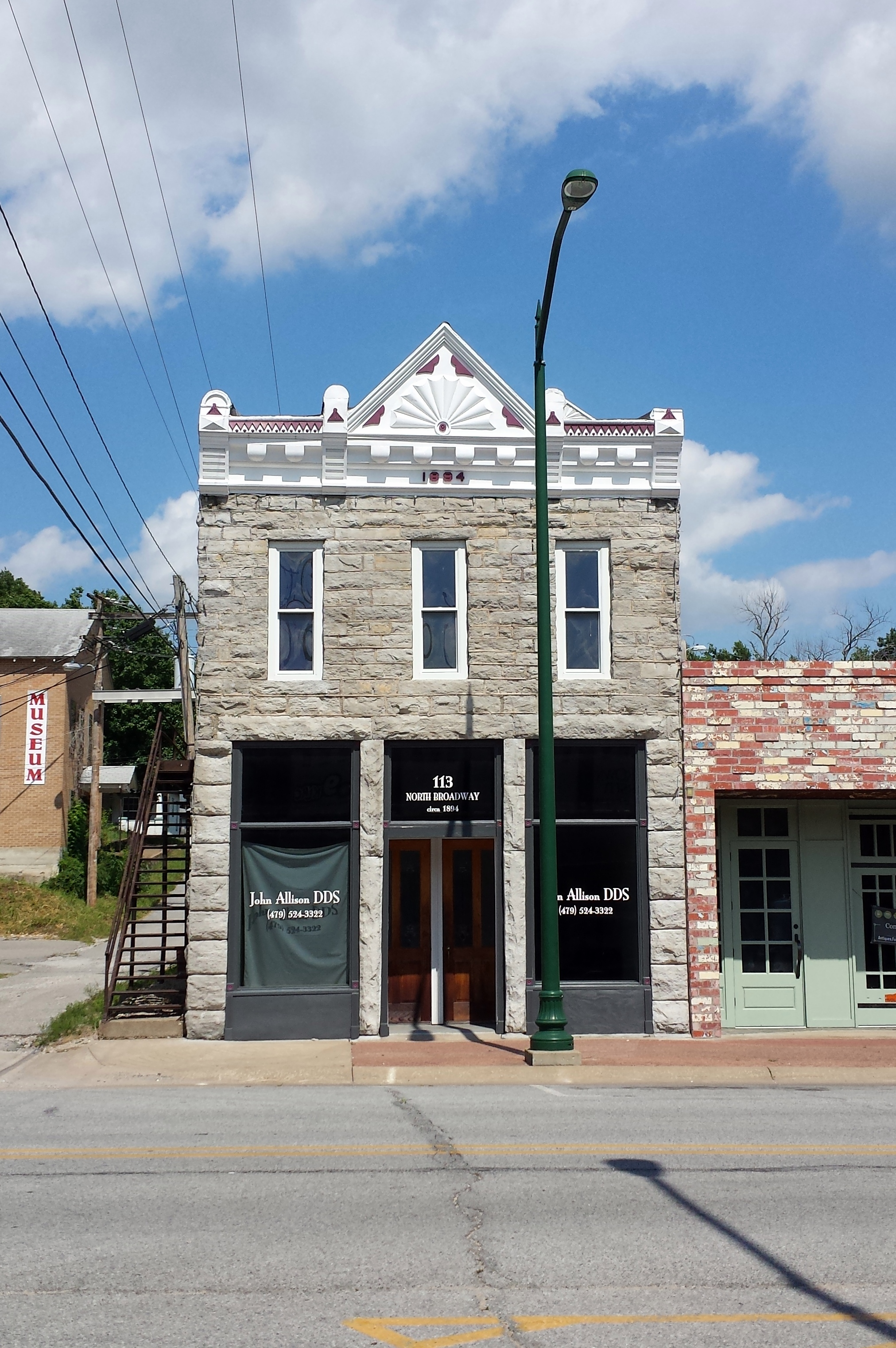

- Location within Arkansas Location within the United States
- Location: 113 N. Broadway, Siloam Springs, Arkansas
- Coordinates: 36°11′8″N 94°32′24″W
- Area: less than one acre
- Built: 1894
- Part of: Siloam Springs Downtown Historic District (ID94001338)
- MPS: Benton County MRA
- NRHP reference No.: 87002432

Significant dates
- Added to NRHP: January 28, 1988
- Designated CP: May 26, 1995

The Stockton Building is a historic commercial building at 113 North Broadway in downtown Siloam Springs, Arkansas. It is a two-story masonry structure with a pressed metal cornice that is horizontal at the outer bays and with a gabled pediment at the center. Built in 1894, it is a distinctive yet vernacular example of late 19th-century commercial architecture, unique in the city.

The building was listed on the National Register of Historic Places in 1988.

== See also ==
- National Register of Historic Places listings in Benton County, Arkansas
