= Henry Furniture Store Building =

- U.S. National Register of Historic Places
- U.S. Historic district – Contributing property
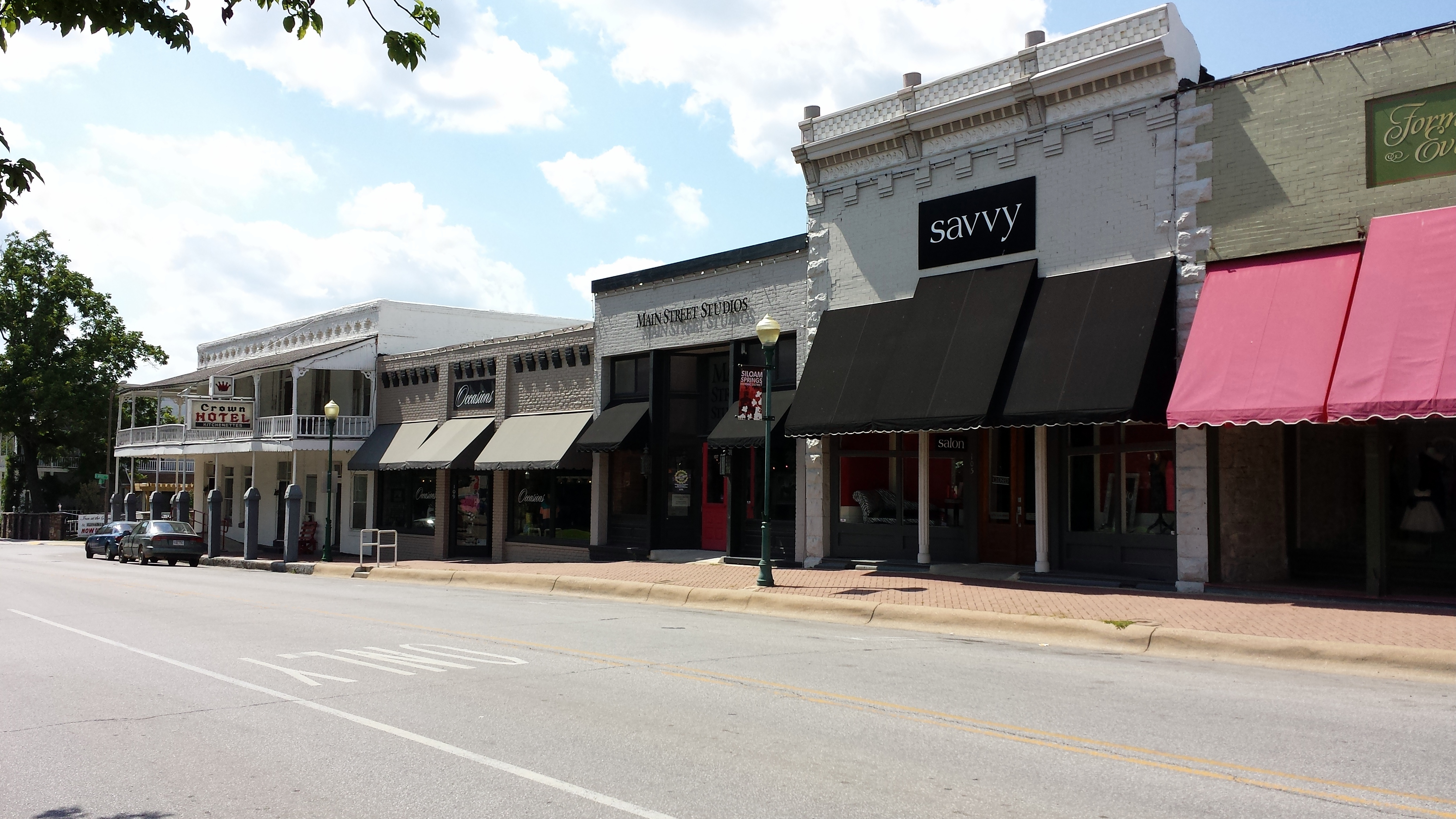
- The "Savvy" building in this photo

- Location within Arkansas Location within the United States
- Location: 107 W. University, Siloam Springs, Arkansas
- Coordinates: 36°11′10″N 94°32′30″W
- Area: less than one acre
- Built: 1900
- Architectural style: Beaux Arts
- Part of: Siloam Springs Downtown Historic District (ID94001338)
- MPS: Benton County MRA
- NRHP reference No.: 94000725

Significant dates
- Added to NRHP: July 15, 1994
- Designated CP: May 26, 1995

The Henry Furniture Store Building is a historic commercial building at 107 West University in Siloam Springs, Arkansas. It is a single-story brick building, with an angled recessed storefront topped by a raised brick parapet set above brick corbelling and a pressed metal cornice. Built c. 1900, it is the best example in the city of commercial architecture from that time period.

The building was listed on the National Register of Historic Places in 1994.

== See also ==
- National Register of Historic Places listings in Benton County, Arkansas
