= Engineering (disambiguation) =

Engineering is a professional discipline.

Engineering may also refer to:

- Engineering (magazine) (established 1866), weekly magazine
- Engineering (constituency), an electoral constituency in Hong Kong
- Engineering (journal) (established 2015), Chinese journal
- Engineering (Scientific Research Publishing journal), predatory journal
- "Engineering", a Series E episode of the television series QI (2007)

== See also ==
- Engineer (disambiguation)
- List of engineering branches
- Outline of engineering
