= Norwich Crown Point =

Norwich Crown Point may refer to:

- Crown Point, Norwich - an area within the city of Norwich, England
- Crown Point TMD - a railway depot in Norwich, England
