= Marine engineer =

Marine engineer may refer to:

- Engineering officer (ship), a licensed mariner that operates and maintains a ship's engines
- A practitioner of marine engineering, a field of engineering

== See also ==
- Engineer (disambiguation)
