= First National Bank (Siloam Springs, Arkansas) =

- U.S. National Register of Historic Places
- U.S. Historic district – Contributing property
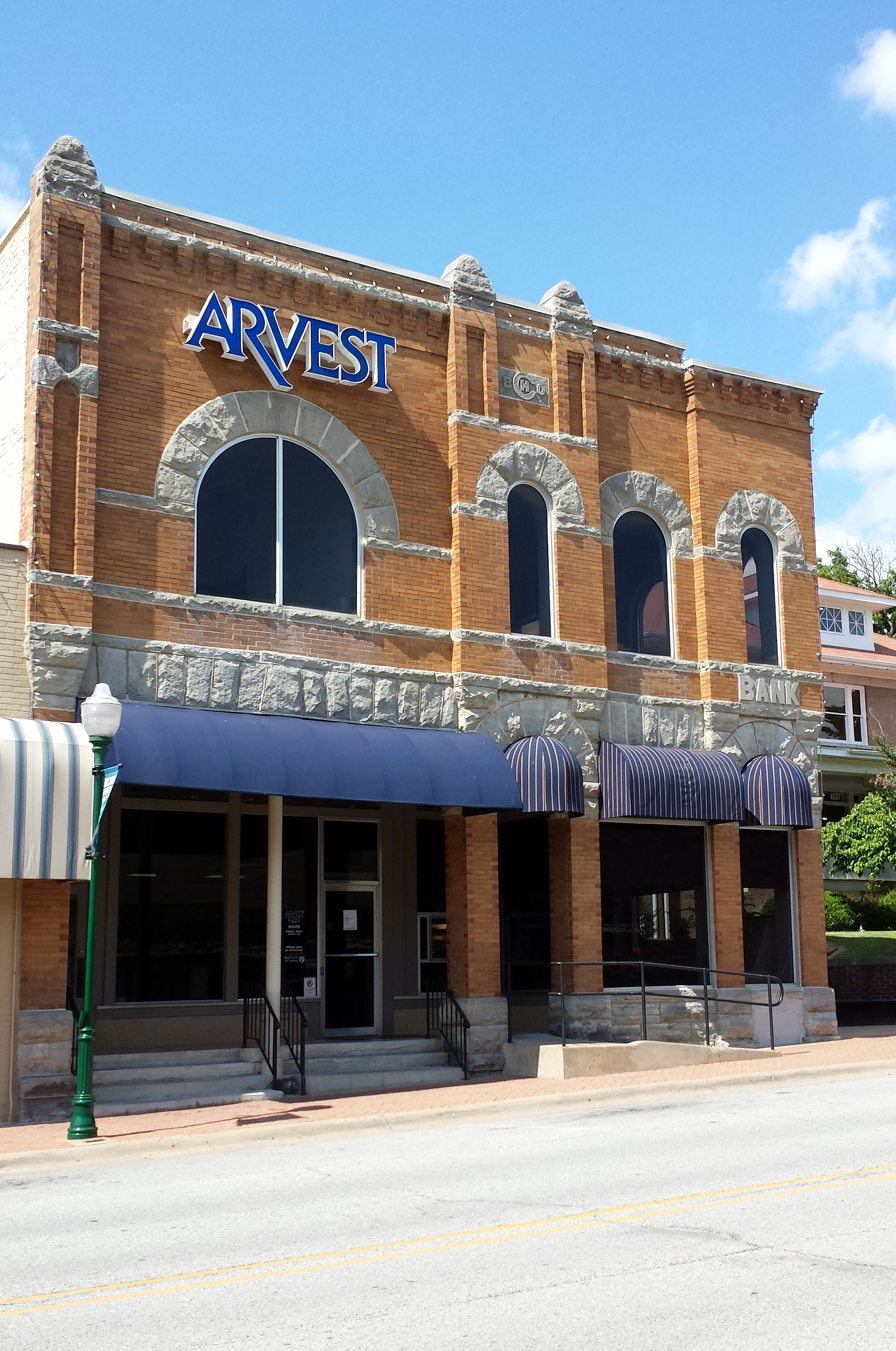

- Location within Arkansas Location within the United States
- Location: 109 E. University, Siloam Springs, Arkansas
- Coordinates: 36°11′10″N 94°32′26″W
- Area: less than one acre
- Built: 1890
- Architectural style: Romanesque
- Part of: Siloam Springs Downtown Historic District (ID94001338)
- MPS: Benton County MRA
- NRHP reference No.: 87002431

Significant dates
- Added to NRHP: January 28, 1988
- Designated CP: May 26, 1995

The First National Bank is a historic commercial building at 109 East University Street in Siloam Springs, Arkansas. It is a two-story brick building, trimmed in stone. Its ground floor is recessed in an arcade supported by square posts, and is separated from the second floor by a stone belt course. The upper floor windows have round stone arches, with two narrow bays projecting slightly. The cornice has corbelled brickwork, and is topped in a few places by stone caps. The building is Siloam Springs' only significant example of Romanesque Revival architecture.

The building was listed on the National Register of Historic Places in 1988.

== See also ==
- National Register of Historic Places listings in Benton County, Arkansas
