= Engineer (disambiguation) =

An engineer is a professional practitioner in various disciplines of engineering.

Engineer may also refer to:

== Occupations ==
- Audio engineer or sound mixer, an operator of recording, broadcasting and mixing consoles
- Flight engineer, an operator of aircraft systems
- Engine officer, also called an engineer, an operator of propulsion systems in the engine department of a ship
- Railroad engineer, an operator of a locomotive
- Stationary engineer, an operator of boilers, turbines and generators
- Engineer officer, a type of military officer in charge of military engineering
- A soldier who performs building, digging, repairing and similar work:
  - Combat engineer
  - Pioneer (military)
  - Sapper

== Arts, entertainment, and media ==
=== Fictional characters ===
- Engineer (comics), the title of two Wildstorm comics characters
- Engineer (Team Fortress 2), a playable class in the video game
- Engineers, a race of aliens, forerunners of humanity, from the 2012 film Prometheus
- The Engineer (comics), a comics character and a member of The Authority (superhero team)
- The Engineer, a character in Miss Saigon

=== Music ===
==== Groups ====
- Engineer (band), an American metal band
- Engineers (band), a British rock band

==== Albums ====
- Engineers (Engineers album), 2005
- Engineers (Gary Numan album), 1980

=== Other arts, entertainment, and media ===
- Engineer (film), a Tamil language film originally slated to be released in 1999
- The Engineer (UK magazine), a United Kingdom magazine first published 1856
- Engineer (US magazine), a magazine published by the U.S. Army Engineer School
- The Western Electric Engineer, also published as The Engineer, by Western Electric
- The Engineer (film), a 2023 film, directed by Danny A. Abeckaser
- "The Engineer" (Star Wars Resistance)

== School-related ==
- Engineer's degree, a graduate degree ranking higher than Master of Philosophy but lower than Doctor of Philosophy
- Engineer, a student or alumnus of Brooklyn Technical High School
- Engineer, an alumnus of one of the French Grandes Écoles
- MIT Engineers, the name of Massachusetts Institute of Technology sports teams
- RPI Engineers, the name of Rensselaer Polytechnic Institute sports teams
- WPI Engineers, the name of the Worcester Polytechnic Institute sports teams

== Other uses ==
- Engineer (name)
- Engineer (horse), an English Thoroughbred stallion
- The Engineer (inn), an inn in Cambridge subsequently renamed The Crown and then The Flying Pig
- Engineers (Finnish Defence Forces)
