= Siloam Springs City Park =

- U.S. National Register of Historic Places
- U.S. Historic district – Contributing property
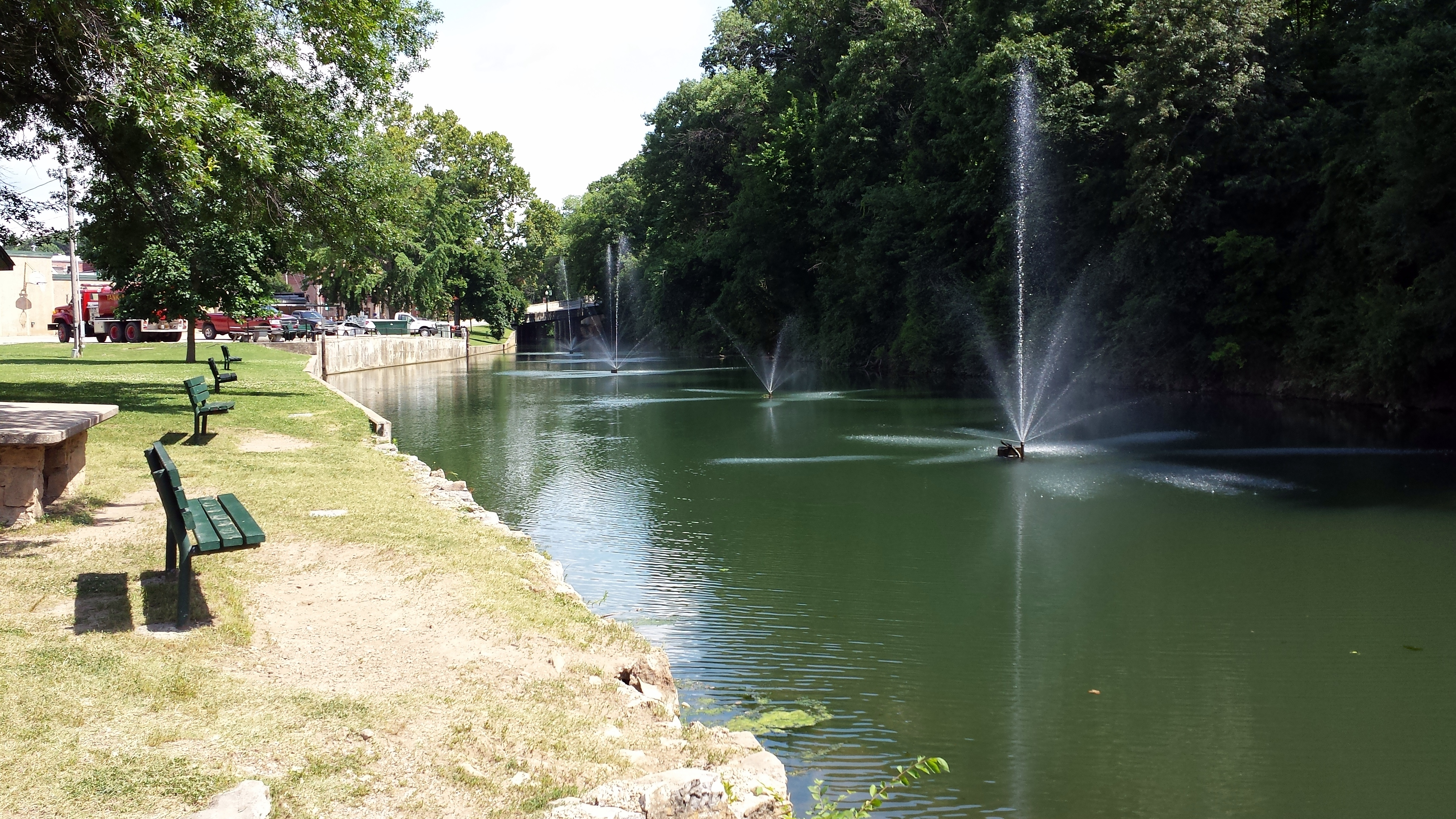
- Sager Creek in City Park

- Location within Arkansas Location within the United States
- Location: Downtown Siloam Springs, Siloam Springs, Arkansas
- Coordinates: 36.18568°N 94.54255°W
- Area: 5.5 acres (2.2 ha)
- Built: 1897
- Architectural style: Queen Anne
- Part of: Siloam Springs Downtown Historic District (ID94001338)
- MPS: Benton County MRA
- NRHP reference No.: 87002383

Significant dates
- Added to NRHP: January 28, 1988
- Designated CP: May 26, 1995

Siloam Springs City Park is a triangular city park in the center of Siloam Springs, Arkansas. Established c. 1897, it is bounded on the north by West University Street, the east by South Mount Olive Street, and roughly on the west by Sager Creek. The creek and two springs are the park's principal natural features; the springs are believed to be those that gave the city its name, and are now located in a sunken concrete basin with fieldstone walls. The park also has a c. 1897 Queen Anne style gazebo and a footbridge across the creek just above a low stone dam. The West University Street bridge, built in 1911, has distinctive handrails with embedded light fixtures.

The park was listed on the National Register of Historic Places in 1988.

== See also ==
- National Register of Historic Places listings in Benton County, Arkansas
