= Crown Wetlands =

Coordinates: 19°41′00″N 80°01′00″W

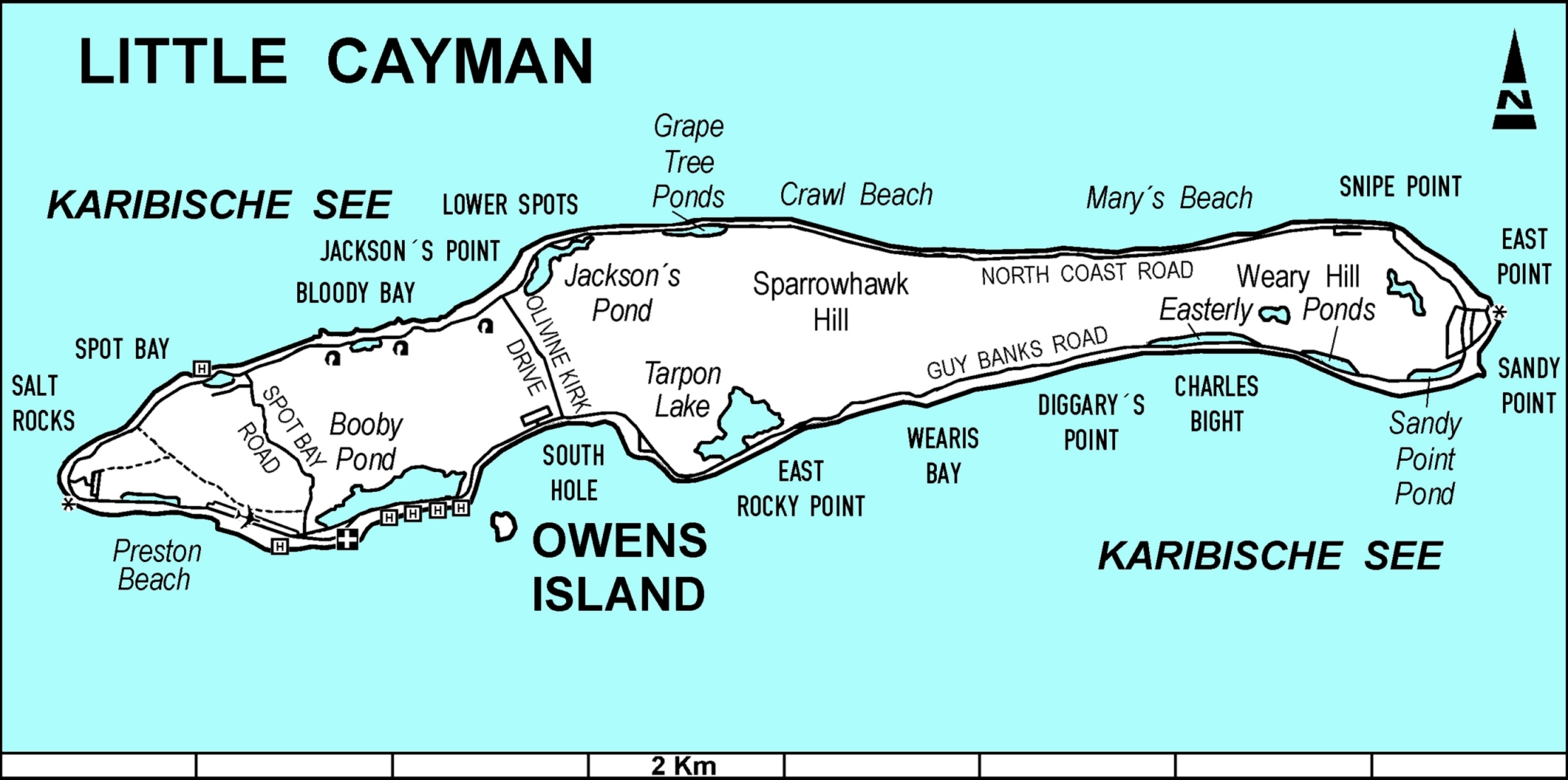
Map of Little Cayman showing the location of many of the wetlands in the IBA

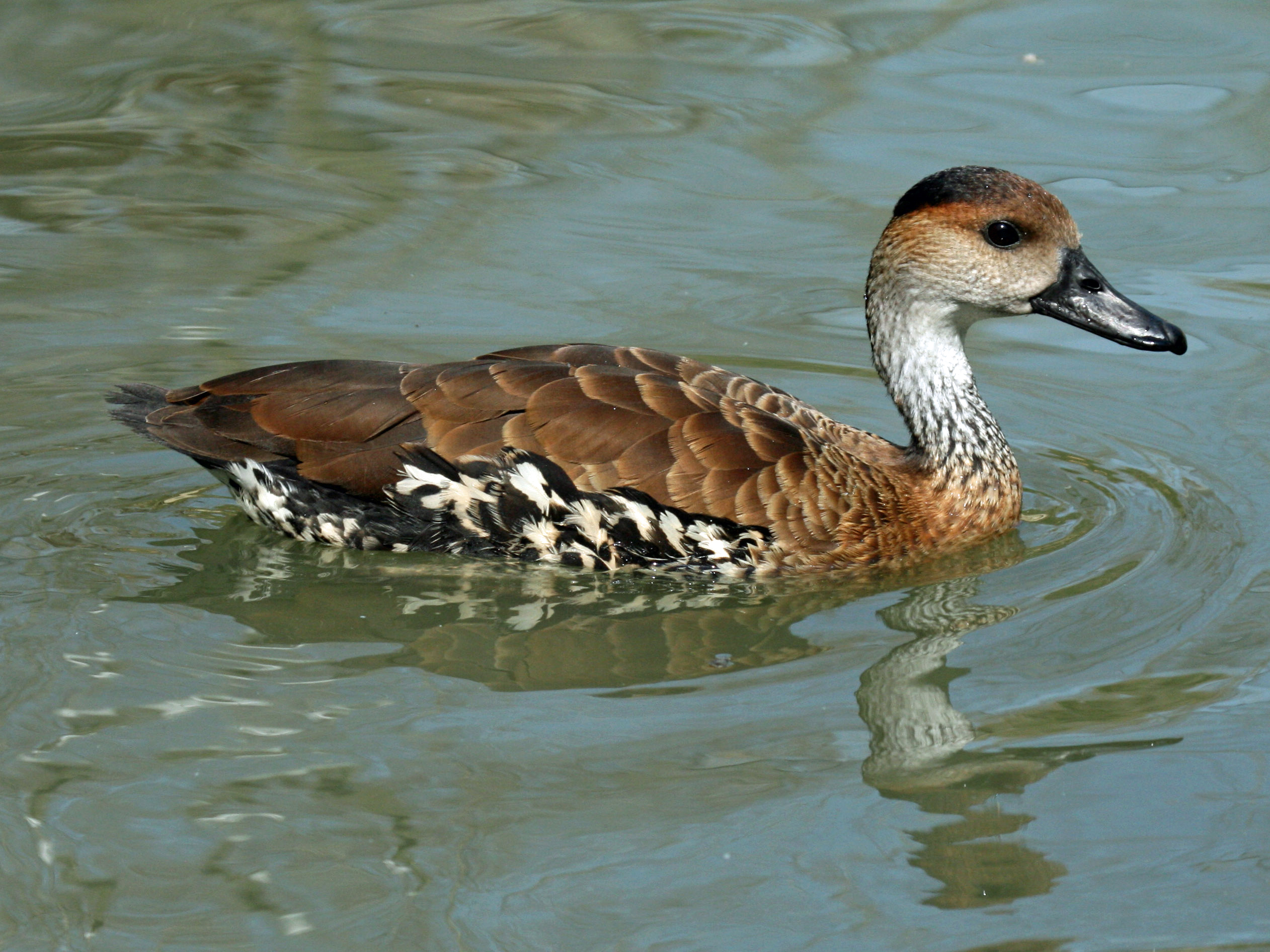
West Indian whistling ducks breed in the IBA

The Crown Wetlands lie on Little Cayman, one of the Cayman Islands, a British Overseas Territory in the Caribbean Sea. Collectively they form one of the territory's Important Bird Areas (IBAs).

== Description ==
The Crown Wetlands cover about 40% of the area of the island. Apart from Tarpon Lake they all dry out seasonally. They vary greatly in size and consist of four distinct types:

- On the northern and southern coasts, there are several hypersaline lagoons surrounded mainly by mangroves. They comprise the Tarpon Lake complex (236 ha), Grape Tree Pond (10 ha), Jackson's Pond (9 ha), Spot Bay Pond (5 ha), Sandy Point Pond (3.5 ha), Easterly Pond (3 ha) and Rosetta Flats Pond (2 ha). The fringing vegetation consists of varying combinations of four mangrove species mixed with Cordia sebestena, Rhabdadenia biflora and Thespesia populnea.
- At the south-western end of the island, near Preston Bay, there are 8.4 ha of brackish wetlands. They support a shrubby vegetation of Conocarpus, Laguncularia and Acrostichum aureum, as well as the herbaceous Rhachiallis americana, Ruppia maritima, Salicornia bigelovii and Sesuvium portulacastrum.
- The 8.5 ha Charles Bight Pond, on the eastern bluff, has a monospecific stand of Conocarpus sp.
- Coot Pond on the south-eastern coast is a 0.1 ha freshwater ephemeral wetland that supports Conocarpus grassland.

=== Birds ===
The IBA was identified as such by BirdLife International because it supports populations of West Indian whistling ducks (with 135 breeding pairs), least terns (with 60 breeding pairs) and white-crowned pigeons.
