= The Crown (hotel) =

Hotel in Amersham, Buckinghamshire, England

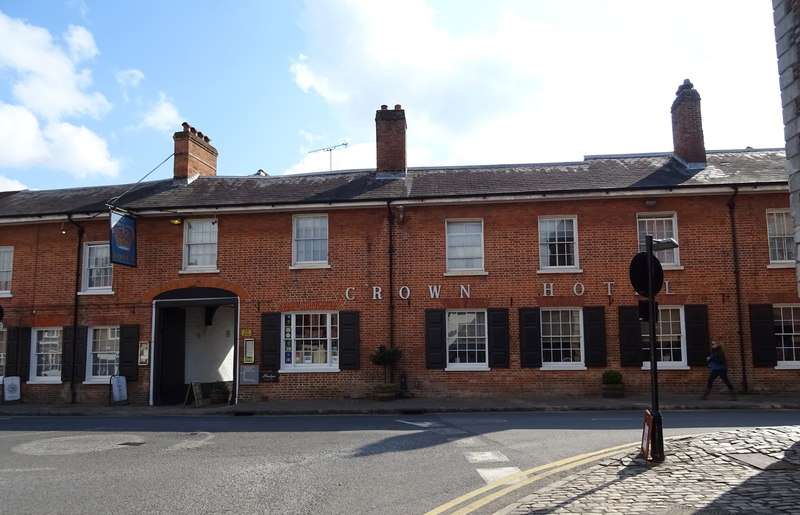

- Location within Buckinghamshire
- Hotel chain: Old Amersham Hotels

General information
- Coordinates: 51.6666°N 0.6167°W
- Owner: Old Amersham Hotels

Other information
- Number of rooms: 40
- Number of restaurants: 1

The Crown (also known as The Crown Inn) is a 16th-century coaching inn in Amersham, Buckinghamshire, England, located on the High Street opposite the Market Hall. The Crown is a Grade II listed building with an Elizabethan exterior and the interior retaining some original features including a mural dating to the 16th century in one bedroom. The inn is currently operated as part of an independent hotel chain, Old Amersham Hotels, and has interiors designed by Ilse Crawford. The hotel has 40 bedrooms, one of which was used as a location in the film Four Weddings and a Funeral. The hotel's restaurant is called The Chop House, reflecting the style of food historically served in coaching inns.

== History ==
According to the National Heritage List for England, the Crown dates back to the late 16th century. During the 18th century It is documented as having belonged to James Child, a member of a family who lived in Amersham for many generations. The exterior of the building was refurbished in the 19th century. The hotel was designated a Grade II listed building in December 1958. It is currently part of an independent hotel chain, the Dhillon Group. The owners, Tej and Sarina Dhillon, also manage other hotels nearby such as The Olde Bell Inn in Hurley and Stoke Place in Stoke Poges.

== Architecture ==
=== Exterior ===
The inn consists of a series of historic buildings surrounding a cobbled courtyard, with some as early as the late 16th century. The main building is two storeys, constructed in red brick with a slate roof. The western building has an Elizabethan-style timber-framed exterior.

=== Interior ===
The main building retains original timbers in the interiors on both floors. The corridors are narrow, typical of an inn of its age. There are wall paintings from the 16th century, including the coat of arms of Queen Elizabeth I. One has a 16th-century mural which was re-discovered during the recent refurbishment.

Soon after the Dhillons took ownership of The Crown, they appointed Ilse Crawford to design a refurbished interior, aiming to create the look of a "modern coaching inn". Crawford explained her approach: "We wanted to create a new English vernacular that picks up on the past but can also evolve and be modern and relevant today". The overall look of the hotel's interior is similar to The Olde Bell in Hurley, which was also designed by Ilse Crawford.

== Facilities ==
The Crown has 40 bedrooms, two function rooms and a bar and restaurant. The hotel's Queen Elizabeth I suite appeared in the film Four Weddings and a Funeral, as the location for the first romantic liaison between Carrie (Andie MacDowell) and Charlie (Hugh Grant). As a result, this suite has proved particularly popular with guests.
