= Crown Hotel, Poole =

Hotel in Poole, Dorset, England

Crown Hotel
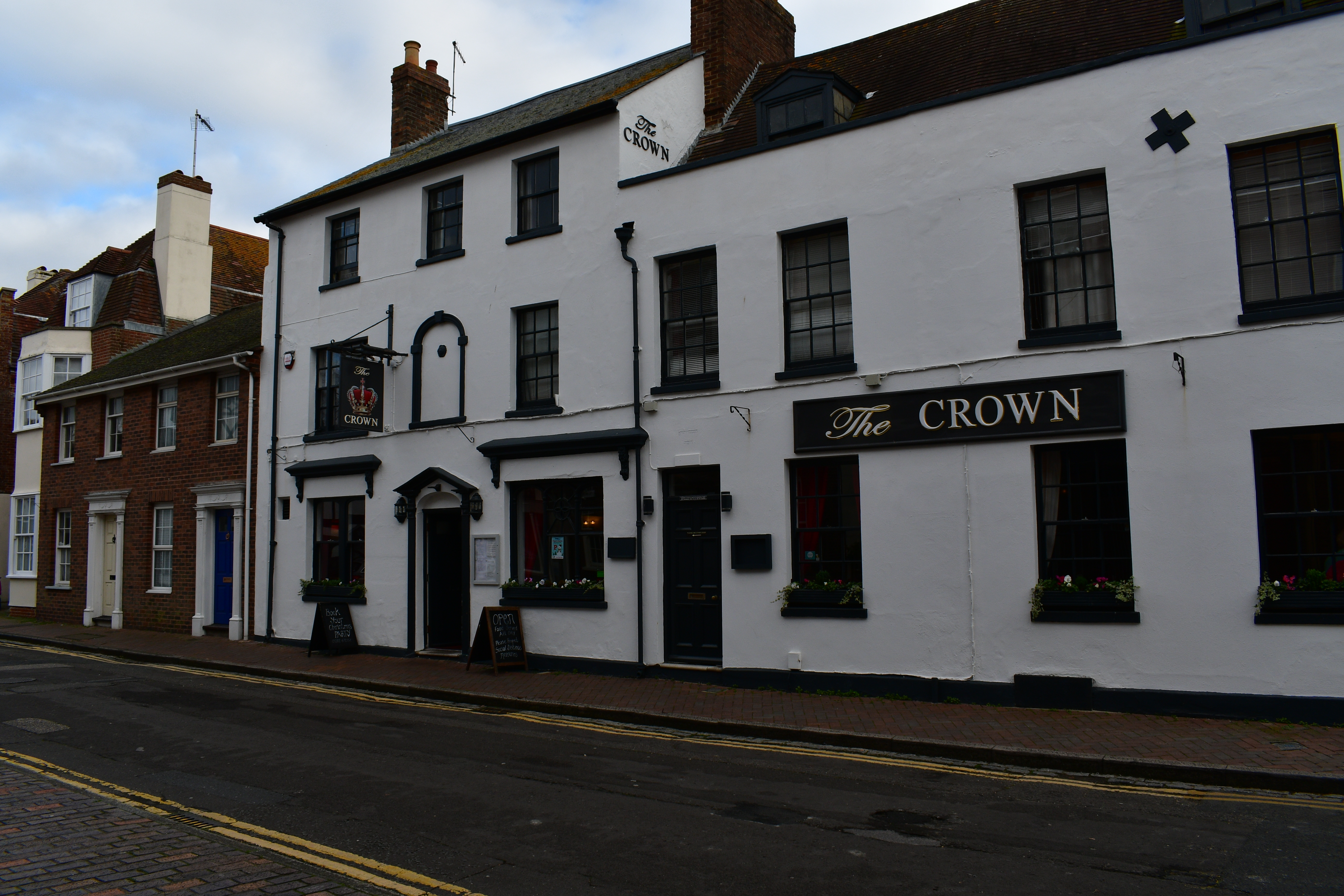

- Location within Dorset

General information
- Location: 21–23 Market Street, Poole, Dorset, England
- Coordinates: 50°42′51″N 1°59′15″W

Website
- https://www.thecrownhotelpoole.com

The Crown Hotel is a hotel and pub in Poole, Dorset, England. It is a traditional pub/inn with a cream painted exterior and red placard.

It became a Grade II listed building in 1974.
