= Keith Crown =

American painter

Keith Crown (May 27, 1918 – January 31, 2010) was an American abstract painter and Professor of Art at the University of Southern California, best known for his vibrant, expressive watercolors of the American southwest.

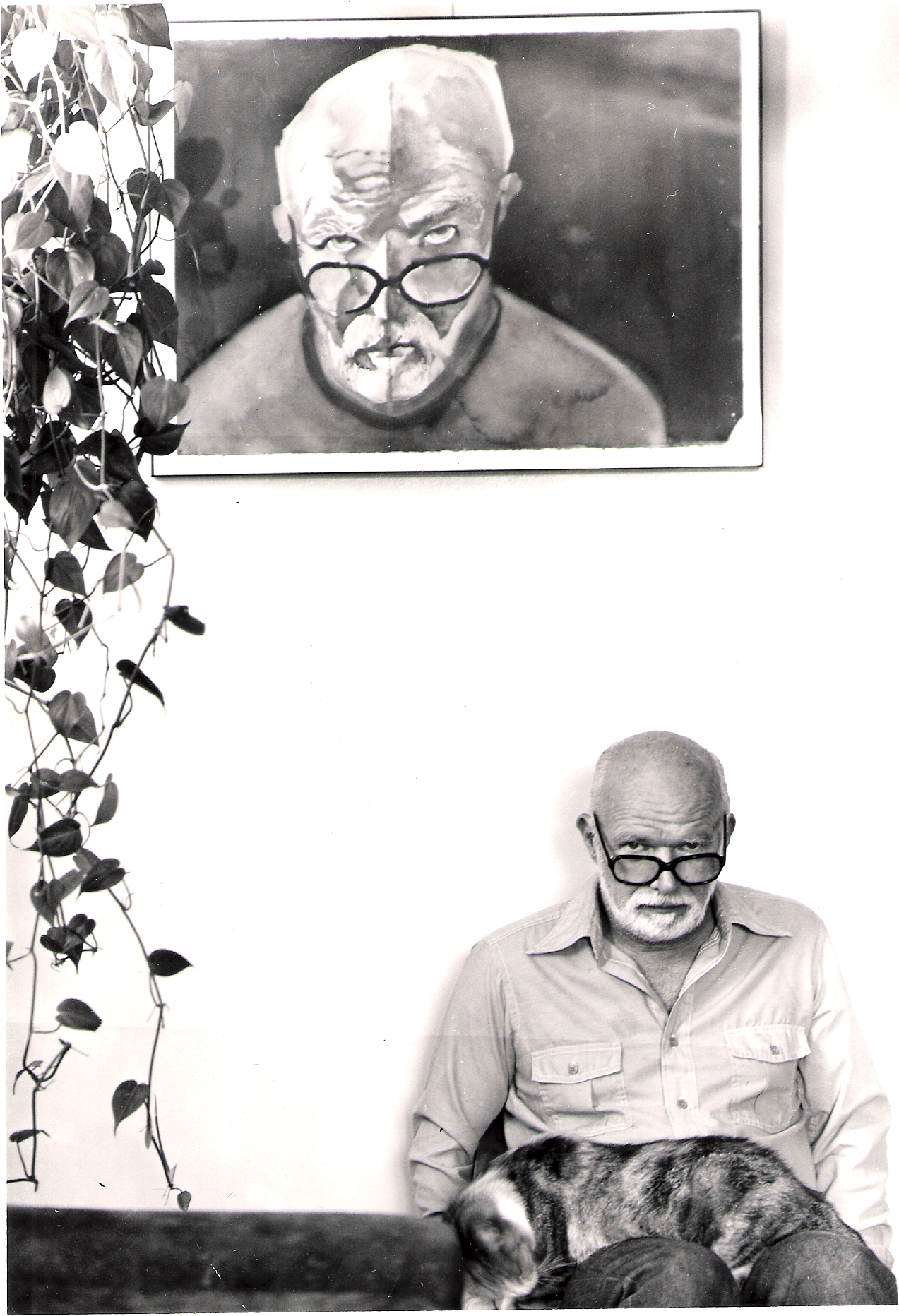
Keith Crown

== Biography ==
Keith Crown was born in Keokuk, Iowa and grew up in Gary, Indiana. He attended the Art Institute of Chicago from 1936–40 and from 1945–46, earning a bachelor's degree in fine art. He served as Staff Sergeant and Infantry Artist in the South Pacific during World War II, where he was a field correspondent providing combat-area illustrations to Yank, the Army Weekly. He was awarded the Bronze Star Medal.

From 1946 to 1983, Crown taught painting and drawing at the University of Southern California Roski School of Fine Art. During his early years in Los Angeles, he painted abstract seascapes, cityscapes and still lifes in oil, casein and watercolor. Like John Marin and Charles Burchfield, Crown wanted to paint invisible elements of nature: wind, moisture, temperature, odors and sounds that were specific to a particular place and time. Other artists who were principal influences in his development include Cézanne, Van Gogh, and Matisse as well as the contemporary painters Milton Avery, Jackson Pollock, and Mark Rothko.

In 1956, he took his first sabbatical leave to Taos, New Mexico, which "was to become an important source of new subject matter." This period of the late 50s and early 60s marks the beginning of the shift to watercolor as his primary medium, and when he first describes himself as an abstract impressionist. Throughout his career Crown was particularly drawn to the landscape of the American southwest and eventually built a home near Taos, but he also spent summers and sabbaticals painting in the states of Wisconsin, Massachusetts, Illinois, Missouri, and as far away as England and the Netherlands.

In 1959 Crown served as president of the National Watercolor Society (NWS, formerly the California Watercolor Society) and was awarded its Lifetime Achievement Award in 2009. He was one of the Founding Board of Directors, Los Angeles chapter of Artist's Equity. In 2003 he received a Lifetime Achievement Award from the Watercolor Honor Society. He retired from teaching in 1983 and moved to Columbia, Missouri with his wife, a professor of Art History at the University of Missouri, Columbia. His paintings have appeared in more than 200 juried and solo exhibitions. He died on January 31, 2010, and is buried in Palos Verdes, California.

== Collections ==
Crown's work is represented in many public and private museums and collections including:

- The Phillips Collection, Washington DC
- Anne S. K. Brown Military Collection, Brown University, Providence, RI
- The Ackland Museum, Chapel Hill, NC
- Los Angeles County Museum, Los Angeles
- Harwood Museum of Art, Taos, NM
- Springfield Art Museum, Springfield, MO
- The Gene Crain Collection of California Watercolors, Laguna Beach, CA
- Museum of Art and Archaeology, University of Missouri, Columbia, MO
- Missouri Student Unions Public Arts Collection, University of Missouri, Columbia, MO
