= Crown (1793 ship) =

History

Great Britain
- Name: Crown
- Owner: 1795: J. Lyall; 1805: J.Mills; 1810: J.Dopkin
- Builder: William Rowe, St Peter's, Newcastle-upon-Tyne
- Launched: 1793
- Fate: Foundered 24 September 1810

General characteristics
- Tons burthen: 423 (bm)
- Complement: 34
- Armament: 14 × 6-pounder guns
- Notes: Teak

Crown was launched at Newcastle upon Tyne in 1793. She essentially sailed as a West Indiaman, but between 1797 and 1799 she made one voyage as an "extra ship", i.e., under charter, for the British East India Company (EIC). She foundered in 1810 on a voyage to Canada.

== Career ==
Crown does not actually appear in Lloyd's Register until 1795. At that time her master is Stranach, her owner Lyall, and her trade London–Jamaica. On 1 March 1796 Lloyd's List reported that Crown, Stranack, master, and Susannah, Skelton, master, both bound for the West Indies, had had to return to Portsmouth after they had run afoul of each other.

EIC voyage: Captain James Stranack acquired a letter of marque on 24 December 1796. He then sailed from Falmouth on 9 Feb 1797, bound for Madras and Bengal. Crown reached Madras on 29 June.

The British government chartered her to serve as a transport in a planned attack on Manila.

She was at Pondicherry on 14 August, and then sailed to Penang, where she arrived on 5 September. However, the British Government cancelled the invasion following a peace treaty with Spain and the British government released the vessels it had engaged. It paid Crown's owners £6753 18s 3d for her services.

Crown arrived at Madras again on 12 December and at Calcutta on 27 January 1798. Homeward bound, she was at Kedgeree on 11 March, and the Cape of Good Hope on 27 June. She had had to put into the Cape because she was dismasted and had sustained other damage. She left the Cape on 4 November, reached Saint Helena on 18 November, and arrived on 6 February 1799 at Long Reach.

Year	Master	Owner	Trade	Notes & Source
1800	Craige; A. Griege	J. Lyall	London transport Newcastle–Jamaica	Register of Shipping (RS)
1805	T. Caffrey	J. Mills	London–Demerara	RS
1810	J. Irvin	J. Dopkin	Plymouth–Quebec	Thorough repair 1807, and damage repaired 1808; RS

While under Caffrey's command, Crown was among the vessels that Lloyd's List reported on 27 December 1803 to have put into Ramsgate with the loss of anchors, cables, and other damage. Crown had been on her way to Demerara. Then on 3 February 1804 Lloyd's List reported that she had had to interrupt her voyage to Demerara and put back into Portsmouth.

== Loss ==
Crown, Simpson, master, foundered on 24 September 1810 on the Grand Banks of Newfoundland. Isabella and Dorothy rescued her crew. Crown was on a voyage from Portsmouth, Hampshire, England, to Halifax, Nova Scotia. The Register of Shipping for 1811 still carried her master as Irwin and her trade as Plymouth-Quebec, but had the notation "LOST" by her name.
