= Johnny Crown =

- Born: Johnny Crown Omolade; 21 January 1997 (age 29); Brooklyn, New York, US
- Origin: Lagos State, Nigeria
- Genres: Afrobeats; hip-hop; RnB
- Occupations: Singer, songwriter
- Years active: 2018–present

Johnny Crown Omolade (born 21 January 1997) professionally known as Johnny Crown is a Nigerian-American Afrobeats and hiphop singer and rapper. His music has been described as a "blend of traditional culture and the American culture."

== Early life and education ==
Johnny Crown Omolade originally from Lagos was born on 21 January 1997, in Brooklyn, New York. Crown began his primary education at Chrisland Schools, Ikeja. He then proceeded to Beach Channel High School and Far Rockaway High School for his secondary education and attended New York University, where he graduated with a bachelor's degree ih media, culture and communication in 2020.

== Career ==
Crown released his debut extended play, Drunk in 2018, and his debut album, The Coolest Prince in the Jungle in 2021.

His music has been described as a "blend of traditional culture and the American culture."

== Bibliography ==
EP

- Drunk

Album

- The Coolest Prince in the Jungle

Singles

- "Cleopatra",
- "Incredible"
- "Bread Winners"
- "The Lord's Prayer"
- "Let My People Go"
- "Oh my god"
