= The Crown, Houghton Regis =

Pub in Houghton Regis, Bedfordshire, England

Coordinates: 51°54′19″N 0°30′55″W

The Crown is a Grade II listed pub in Houghton Regis, Bedfordshire, England.

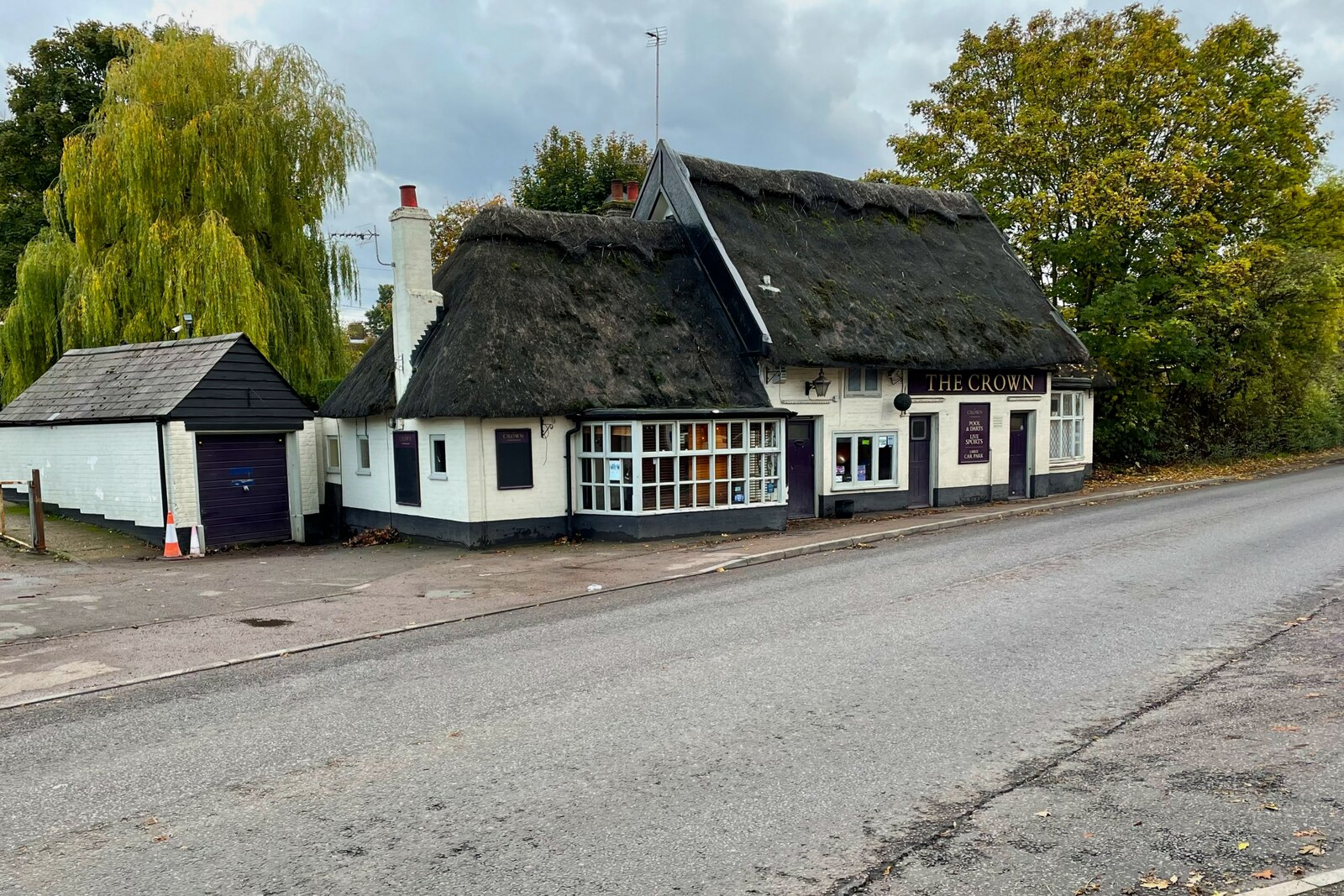
The Crown in 2022

It is a thatched pub built in the 17th century, and largely unaltered since being refitted in the 1930s. It is on the Regional Inventory of Historic Pub Interiors for East Anglia.
