= The Crown, Bristol =

Pub in Bristol, England

The Crown
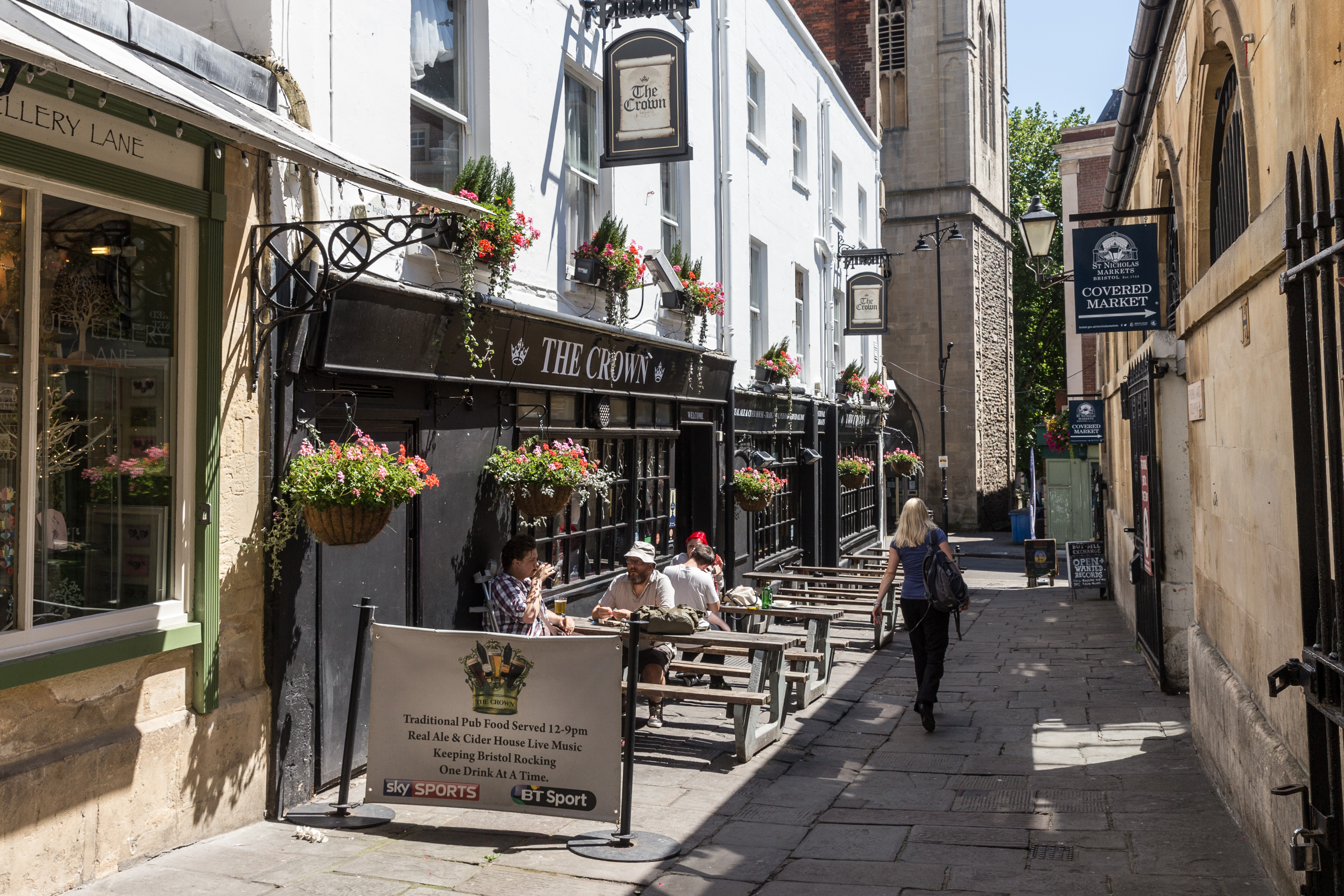

- Location within Bristol

General information
- Location: Bristol, England
- Coordinates: 51.4542°N 2.5928°W

The Crown is a historic pub in Bristol, England, near to St Nicholas Market, an area known as "the Old City". The Crown was built in the 18th century and is a Grade II listed building.

It was built on the medieval Bristol Tolzey Court. This court had been a meeting place for Bristol's merchants, and had jurisdiction over a wide range of cases involving damage claims or disputed debts. The Crown has occupied this site since 1741. Originally it was the vaulted cellars that formed the original trading area. These were initially known as The Trap, but subsequently became known as The Crown Tap Cellar.

Since the closure of the Eclipse in July 2006, the Crown now rivals the Hatchet as an alternative pub, which is popular with goths, punks, rockers, metalheads and emos.

There are regular alternative clubs in the old cellar (known as the Trap) of the Crown. The cellar is also said to be haunted by a ghost of a gentleman from the 17th century wearing a periwig, who only appears to women.
