= Owl and Pussycat, Shoreditch =

Pub in Shoreditch, London

Coordinates: 51.524267°N 0.0754392°W

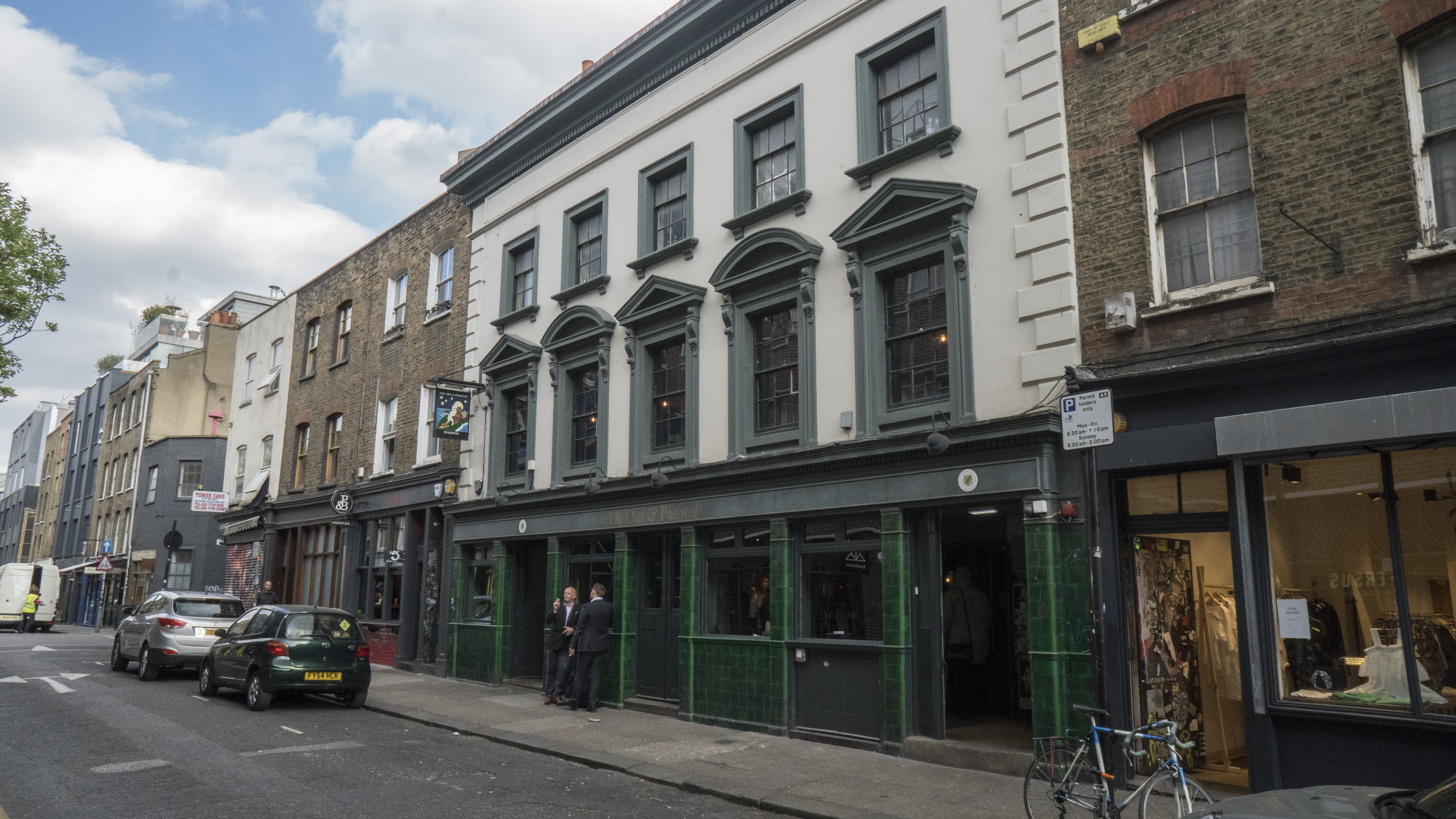
The Owl and Pussycat pub on Redchurch Street

The Owl and Pussycat is a pub at 34 Redchurch Street in the Shoreditch area of London.

It is a Grade II listed building, under its original name, The Crown, dating back to the 18th century.

From 1983 to 1987 it was run as "The Alternative", London's first 7 night/week Lesbian pub.

It is part of the Geronimo Inns pub chain.
