= Crowne =

Crowne is an English surname. Notable people with the surname include:

- John Crowne (1641–1712), British dramatist, son of William
- William Crowne (1617–1682), English officer of arms, politician, and colonel

== See also ==
- Crown (surname)
- Crowne Plaza
