= The Crown, Twickenham =

Pub in Twickenham, London

Coordinates: 51.451173°N 0.318565°W

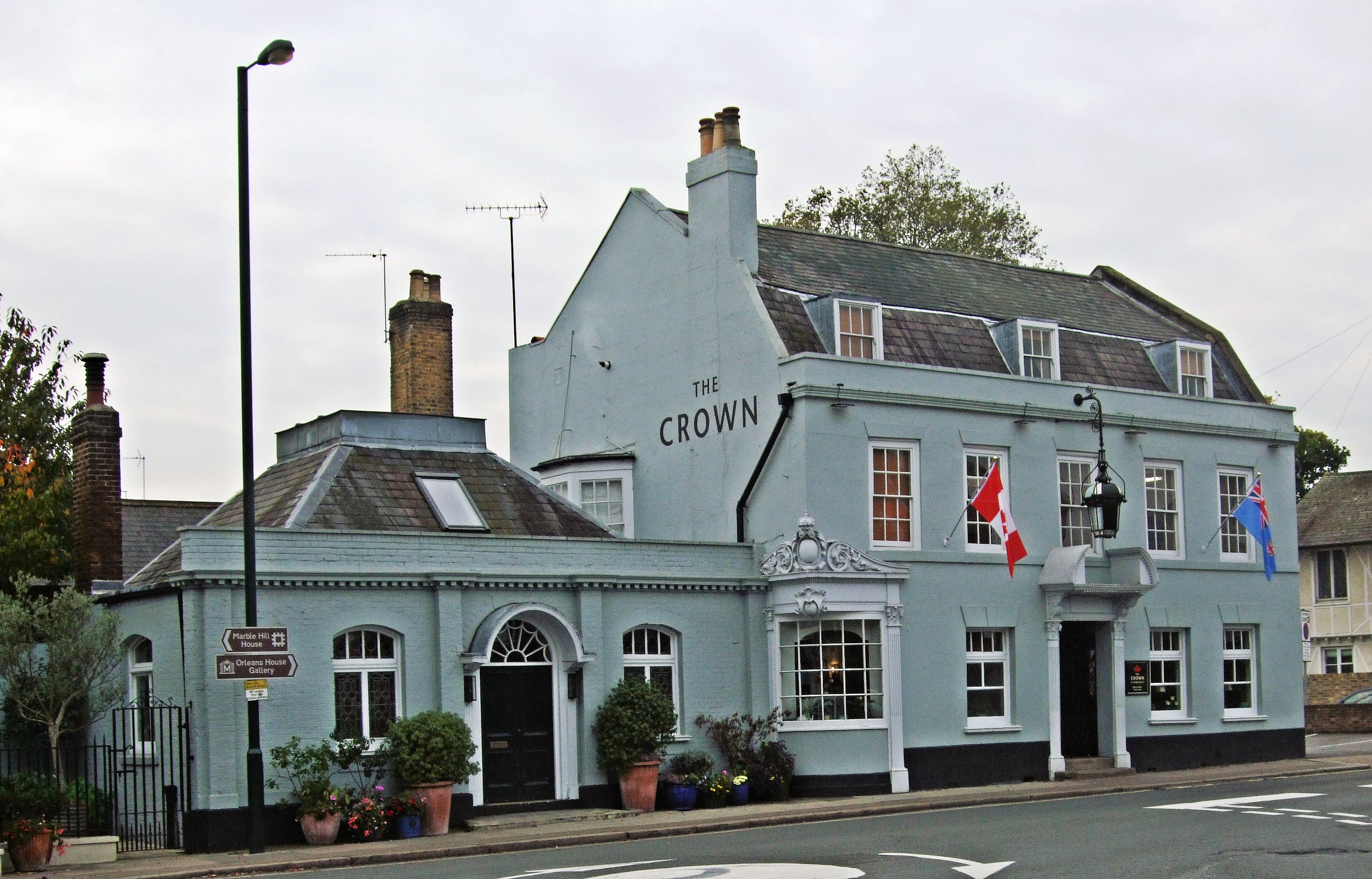

- Location within London Borough of Richmond upon Thames

General information
- Type: Public house
- Location: 174 Richmond Road, Twickenham, London TW1 (in the London Borough of Richmond upon Thames)

Listed Building – Grade II
- Official name: The Crown Public House
- Designated: 25 May 1983
- Reference no.: 1250208

The Crown is a pub at 174 Richmond Road, Twickenham, London TW1. It is a Grade II listed building, dating back to the late 18th century.
