= Crown Hotel, Sydney =

Heritage-listed hotel in Sydney, Australia

Crown Hotel
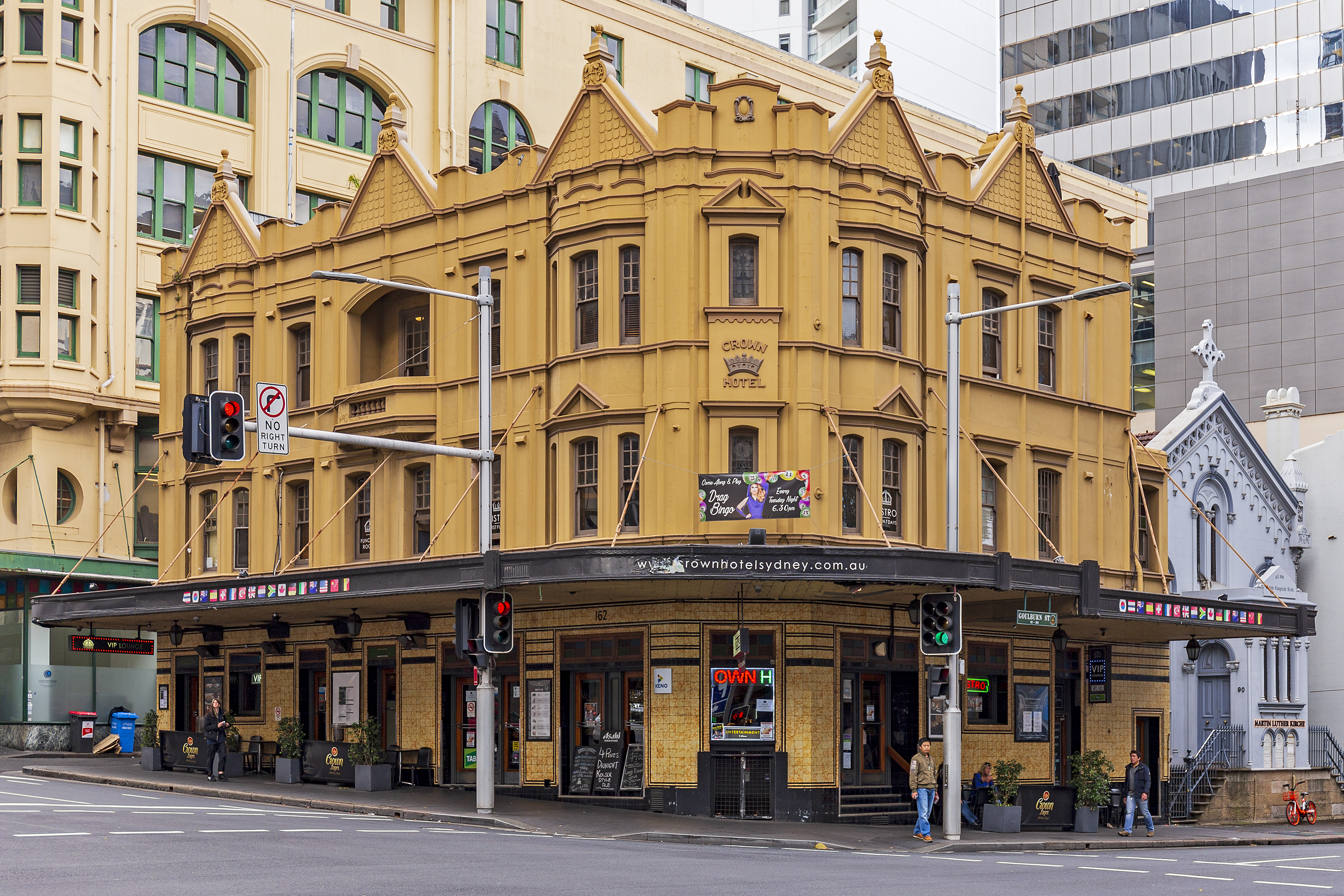

- Location within Sydney Location within Australia
- 33.8782°S 151.2095°E
- Location: 160–162 Elizabeth Street, Sydney, New South Wales, Australia

Site notes
- Owner: Crown Hotel

New South Wales Heritage Register
- Official name: Crown Hotel
- Type: state heritage (built)
- Designated: 2 April 1999
- Reference no.: 733
- Type: Hotel
- Category: Commercial

The Crown Hotel is a heritage-listed hotel at 160–162 Elizabeth Street, Sydney, New South Wales, Australia.

== History ==
The coastal Aboriginal people around Sydney are known as the Eora. Central Sydney is therefore often referred to as "Eora Country". Within the City of Sydney local government area, the traditional owners are the Cadigal and Wangal bands of the Eora.

Following white colonisation from 1788, land grants in the 1790s saw much of Surry Hills come under private ownership. Captain Joseph Foveaux was the first Surry Hills landowner. Samuel Terry, an ex-convict controlled 19,000 acres of pastoral land at the southern end of the city in the area now known as Surry Hills. The Crown Hotel is located on the corner of Elizabeth and Goulburn streets, just outside the area of Donaldson's Farm and on land originally known as Sheriff's Garden.

The site of the hotel was part of the original grant to John Wilde dated 1823. The earliest record of a Crown hotel on the site is in the Sands Directory and occurs in 1882 when a Mrs. Sarah Walsh is recorded as occupant (licensee) of the Crown Hotel. In 1883, the Crown Hotel is recorded as No. 160 with licensee John Bell. Charles Hones became licensee in 1888.

The present building is said to have been constructed as a guesthouse in the early 1900s and licensed in c. 1909. The land appears to have been resumed by the Municipal Council of Sydney in 1910 and the hotel was leased to John Rundle in 1921. Tooth & Co purchased the property from the council in 1936. Tooth then leased the hotel. Licensees included John Edward Hennessy (1937–1954), Louis John Liddle (1954–1958), Paul John Berry (1957–1960), Ronald Moroni Samuel (1960—unknown).

== Description ==
The Crown Hotel is a three-storey rendered brick building in the Federation Anglo Dutch style located on a prominent corner site on the corner of Elizabeth Street and Goulburn Street. The building features rendered detailing and Dutch gables typical of the style, with ceramic wall tiling below its awning. The building remains largely intact with original doors and windows. A large satellite dish is located on the roof and a steel frame structure can be seen from the street. A rendered brick laundry and store takes up much of the roofspace and the remainder is tiled and used as an outdoor deck. The original layout and planning remains on the upper floors. Early striped ceramic wall tiling has been retained on most of the walls of the public bar. The bar counter and fittings do not appear original, dating from the early 1930s, but may be located in the original position. The interior retains original joinery and the Saloon bar has timber panelling over the original tiling.

== Significance ==
The Crown Hotel is significant as a fine and largely intact example of the style used in Australian corner hotels. The existing hotel continues the tradition of an earlier hotel of the same name on the site. The building is also significant for the strong contribution it makes to the character of the immediate area and for the aesthetic relationship it has with the Victorian buildings in Goulburn Street. It is one of only three hotels in the style located within the city; the others are the Forbes Hotel on the corner of York and King streets and the Chamberlain Hotel on the corner of Pitt and Campbell streets. The building has significance as part of the network of small purpose built hotels providing a social / recreational venue and budget accommodation located within a short distance from Central station and reflects the social character of the area during the early years of the 20th century.

== Heritage listing ==
Crown Hotel was listed on the New South Wales State Heritage Register on 2 April 1999.
