= Crown Point, Oregon =

Crown Point may refer to one of these Oregon locations:

- Crown Point (Oregon), a summit in Multnomah County
- Crown Point, a populated place in Coos County, Oregon
- Crown Point, a summit in Baker County, Oregon
