= Engineer (name) =

Engineer is an occupational surname or a nickname for an engineer that may refer to the following people:

Nickname

- Engineer Rashid (born 1967), Indian politician

Surname

- Aryana Engineer (born 2001), Canadian actress
- Asghar Ali Engineer (1939–2013), Indian Islamic scholar and leader of the Progressive Dawoodi Bohra
- Aspy Engineer (1912–2002), Indian air marshal and ambassador to Iran
- Farokh Engineer (born 1938), Indian cricketer
- Gopal Singh Engineer, Indian politician
- Minoo Merwan Engineer, Indian Air Force officer
- Navin Engineer (born 1951), British billionaire
