= Crown Inn, Glossop =

Pub in Derbyshire, England

Crown Inn
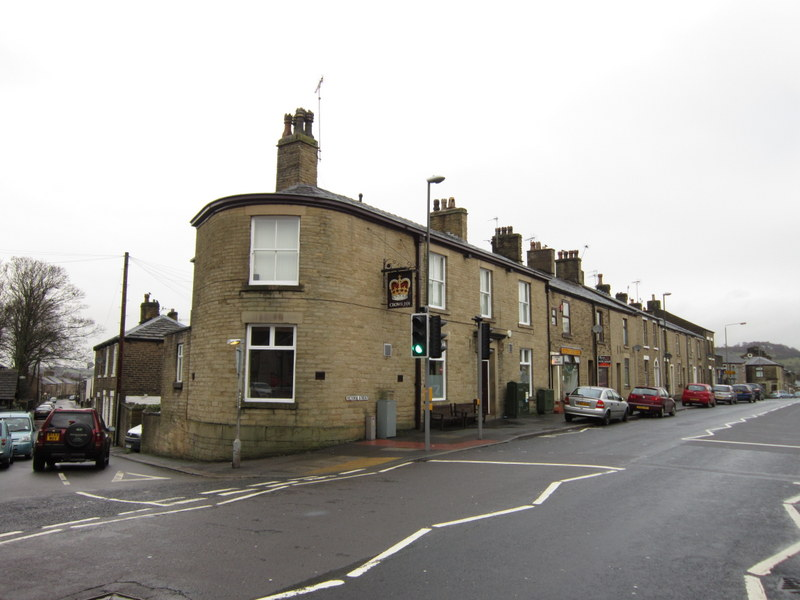
- The pub in 2012

General information
- Type: Public house
- Location: 142 Victoria Street, Glossop, Derbyshire, England
- Coordinates: 53.439256°N 1.952422°W
- Year built: 1846; 180 years ago
- Owner: Samuel Smith's

The Crown Inn is a public house on Victoria Street in Glossop, a town in Derbyshire, England. Built in 1846, it has been owned by Samuel Smith's since 1977. The pub is noted for its well-preserved historic interior and is included on CAMRA's National Inventory of Historic Pub Interiors, where it is awarded three stars and described as being of "outstanding national historic importance".

== History ==
The public house was built in 1846 by John Hampson, whose application for a licence was initially refused. A licence was granted in 1848 to his son, George Hampson, who remained landlord for the next 15 years. By 1851 he was recorded as an innkeeper of the Crown Inn.

The Crown Perpetual Money Society was based at the pub in 1860, and the following years saw a succession of licensees including Hannah Hampson, Samuel Pickford and William Nelson. Richard Russell later purchased the property before selling it in 1878 to George Farley, who sold it to Chester's Brewery in 1890.

During the early 20th century the pub hosted meetings of local friendly societies, including the Grand United Order of Oddfellows and the Royal Ancient Order of Buffaloes. In 1928 its licence was reviewed as part of proposals to reduce the number of licensed premises in Glossop, but it was subsequently renewed. Eric Redfern was landlord from 1939 to 1956, except during periods of military service in the Second World War, when his wife Betsy Redfern managed the pub.

The pub has been part of Samuel Smith's estate since 1977. According to the Campaign for Real Ale (CAMRA), local tradition maintains that the name of a former brewery survives in a mosaic beneath the carpet in the entrance porch.

It was included on CAMRA's National Inventory of Historic Pub Interiors before the inventory's grading system was revised. Under the revised scheme, it is rated three stars and its interior is regarded as being "of outstanding national historic importance". As of June 2026, the freehold was owned by Samuel Smith's.

== Architecture ==
=== Interior ===
The pub retains a lobby bar and three separate drinking rooms, one of which was later brought into pub use. Elements of an inter-war refurbishment also survive. A full-height glazed screen separates the entrance porch from the lobby bar. Behind it is the servery, which retains a mahogany bar counter likely dating from the Victorian period, together with a three-part bar-back of similar character. Although some later alterations have been made, much of the historic serving area remains intact.

The principal room on the left has retained its Victorian proportions and includes fixed perimeter seating, a pair of simple entrance screens, decorative ceiling roses and a raised area formerly associated with darts. Three original ventilation grilles also survive.

Two snugs are located on the opposite side of the pub. The front snug retains inter-war fixed seating, a doorway screen and a tiled fireplace with a marble-effect overmantel. The rear snug, which has been used as part of the pub since at least the mid-20th century, contains fixed seating and a later cast-iron fireplace.

A short passage leads to the toilets at the rear. Etched and frosted glass door panels bearing the painted inscriptions "Ladies" and "Gents", probably dating from the mid-20th century, survive, although the toilet facilities have since been modernised.
