= Gordon Crown =

British chess player

Gordon Thomas Crown
Personal information
- Born: Gordon Thomas Crown; 20 June 1929 Liverpool, England
- Died: 17 November 1947 (aged 18)

Chess career
- Country: United Kingdom

Gordon Thomas Crown (20 June 1929 – 17 November 1947) was a promising British chess player who died of appendicitis at the age of eighteen. He is best known for his win against the Russian Grandmaster Alexander Kotov shortly before his death.

== Biography ==
Crown was born in Liverpool in 1929. He finished second in the British under 18 championship in 1946 and improved rapidly, winning the Premier Reserve section of the 1946/7 Hastings International Chess Congress. This led to his being placed on the reserve list for the 1947 British Chess Championship. Following the withdrawal of the defending champion Robert Forbes Combe, he was allowed to play in the championship, where he finished third (Harry Golombek won).

Consequently, he was selected to play for the British team in the 1947 Britain-USSR match, where he caused a sensation by defeating the Soviet Grandmaster Alexander Kotov, though he lost the return game. He also defeated Max Gellis in a Britain-Australia radio match.

On 17 November 1947 he was admitted to hospital, complaining of a stomach upset. Diagnosed too late with appendicitis, complicated by his diabetes, he died in the operating theatre.

His friend (and former British champion) Leonard Barden speculates that had he lived, Crown would have become at least a strong Grandmaster, further noting that he was " ... open, friendly and modest as well as a clear and enthusiastic explainer of his chess ideas; I think he would have been like Keres or Gligoric in their countries, a model for our young players."

Harry Golombek was similarly impressed with Crown's play, stating that "In his short life, he had already shown himself to be of master strength and was potentially a very great player."
