= Crown North =

- Location within Gauteng Location within South Africa
- Coordinates: 26°12′38″S 28°0′54″E
- Country: South Africa
- Province: Gauteng
- Municipality: City of Johannesburg
- Time zone: UTC+2 (SAST)
- Postal code (street): 2092

Crown North is a suburb of Johannesburg, South Africa. It is located in Region F of the City of Johannesburg Metropolitan Municipality.
