= Laurie Crown =

English footballer

Personal information
- Full name: Lawrence Crown
- Date of birth: 25 February 1898
- Place of birth: Fulwell, Sunderland, England
- Date of death: 1984 (aged 85–86)
- Position: Full back

Senior career*
Years	Team	Apps	(Gls)
1914–1918	Sunderland All Saints		
1918–1919	The Venerable Bede's FC		
1919–1920	Furness Athletic		
1920–1921	Sunderland	0	(0)
1921–1922	Darlington	0	(0)
1922	Redcar		
1922–1926	South Shields	86	(3)
1926–1927	Newcastle United	2	(0)
1927–1928	Bury	17	(0)
1928–1931	Coventry City	112	(0)
Total		217	(3)
- * Club domestic league appearances and goals

Lawrence Crown (25 February 1898 – 1984) was an English footballer who played in the Football League for Bury, Coventry City, Newcastle United and South Shields.
