= Crown Gardens =

- Location within Gauteng Location within South Africa
- Coordinates: 26°15′04″S 28°00′20″E
- Country: South Africa
- Province: Gauteng
- Municipality: City of Johannesburg
- Main Place: Johannesburg
- Established: 1950

Area
  - Total: 0.80 km^{2} (0.31 sq mi)

Population (2011)
  - Total: 4,110
  - Density: 5,100/km^{2} (13,000/sq mi)

Racial makeup (2011)
  - Black African: 25.4%
  - Coloured: 16.9%
  - Indian/Asian: 21.8%
  - White: 28.9%
  - Other: 7.0%

First languages (2011)
  - English: 45.2%
  - Afrikaans: 22.6%
  - Zulu: 7.6%
  - Sotho: 3.3%
  - Other: 21.3%
- Time zone: UTC+2 (SAST)
- Postal code (street): 2091

Crown Gardens is a suburb of Johannesburg, South Africa. It is located in Region F of the City of Johannesburg Metropolitan Municipality.

== History ==
The suburb is situated on part of two old Witwatersrand farms called Ormonde and Vierfontein. It was established on 2 March 1950 and takes its name from Crown Mines.
