= The Crown, Islington =

Pub in Islington, London

Coordinates: 51°32′14″N 0°06′34″W

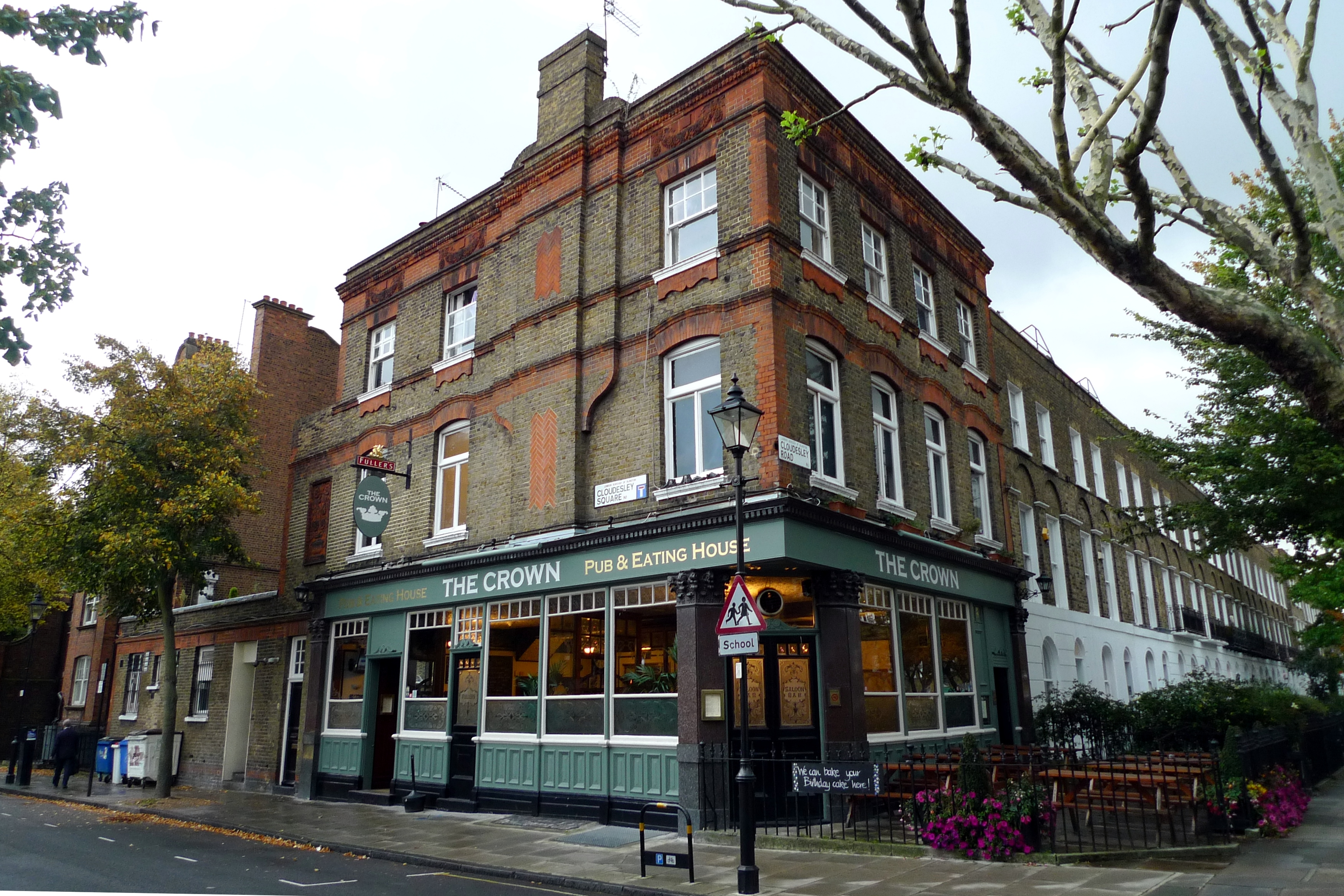
The Crown

The Crown is a Grade II listed public house at 116 Cloudesley Road, Islington, London.

It was built in the late 19th century.
