= The Thomas Crown Affair =

The Thomas Crown Affair is one of three films:

- The Thomas Crown Affair (1968 film), a film starring Steve McQueen and Faye Dunaway
- The Thomas Crown Affair (1999 film), a remake of the 1968 film, starring Pierce Brosnan and Rene Russo
- The Thomas Crown Affair (2027 film), a remake starring Michael B. Jordan and Adria Arjona
