= USS Crown Point =

Multiple United States Navy ships have been named USS Crown Point, for the Battle of Crown Point, but all have been renamed before entering service:

- USS Crown Point (CV-27) was an Independence-class aircraft carrier, originally planned as the light cruiser USS Fargo (CL-85), but renamed USS Langley (CVL-27) before being launched
- USS Crown Point (CV-32) was an Essex-class aircraft carrier, renamed USS Leyte (CV-32) before being launched
