= Crown Hotel (Siloam Springs, Arkansas) =

- Lakeside Hotel
- U.S. National Register of Historic Places
- U.S. Historic district – Contributing property
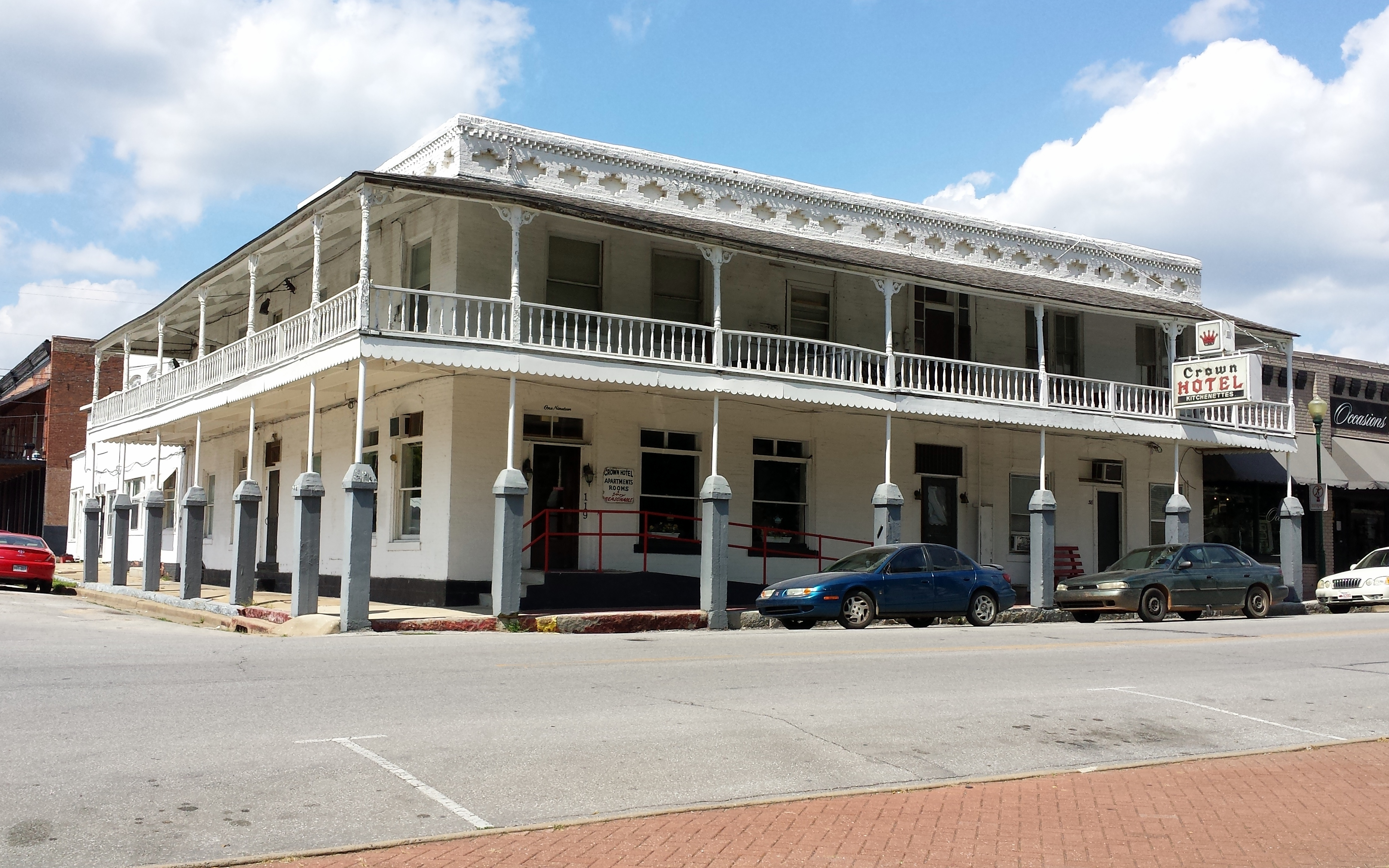

- Location within Arkansas Location within the United States
- Location: 119 W. University St, Siloam Springs, Arkansas
- Coordinates: 36°11′10″N 94°32′30″W
- Area: less than one acre
- Built: 1881
- Part of: Siloam Springs Downtown Historic District (ID94001338)
- NRHP reference No.: 79000432

Significant dates
- Added to NRHP: November 15, 1979
- Designated CP: May 26, 1995

The Crown Hotel, formerly the Lakeside Hotel is a historic hotel building at 119 West University Street in Siloam Springs, Arkansas. It is a two-story brick building in an L shape, with a hip roof topped by a low cupola. It is distinguished by the brickwork at the roofline, and by the delicately spindled two-story porch that wraps around two sides of the building. Built in 1881, just one year after the city's founding, it is one of the city's oldest commercial buildings, and may have been its first brick hotel.

The building was listed on the National Register of Historic Places in 1979.

== See also ==
- National Register of Historic Places listings in Benton County, Arkansas
