= The Flying Pig =

Public house in Cambridge, England

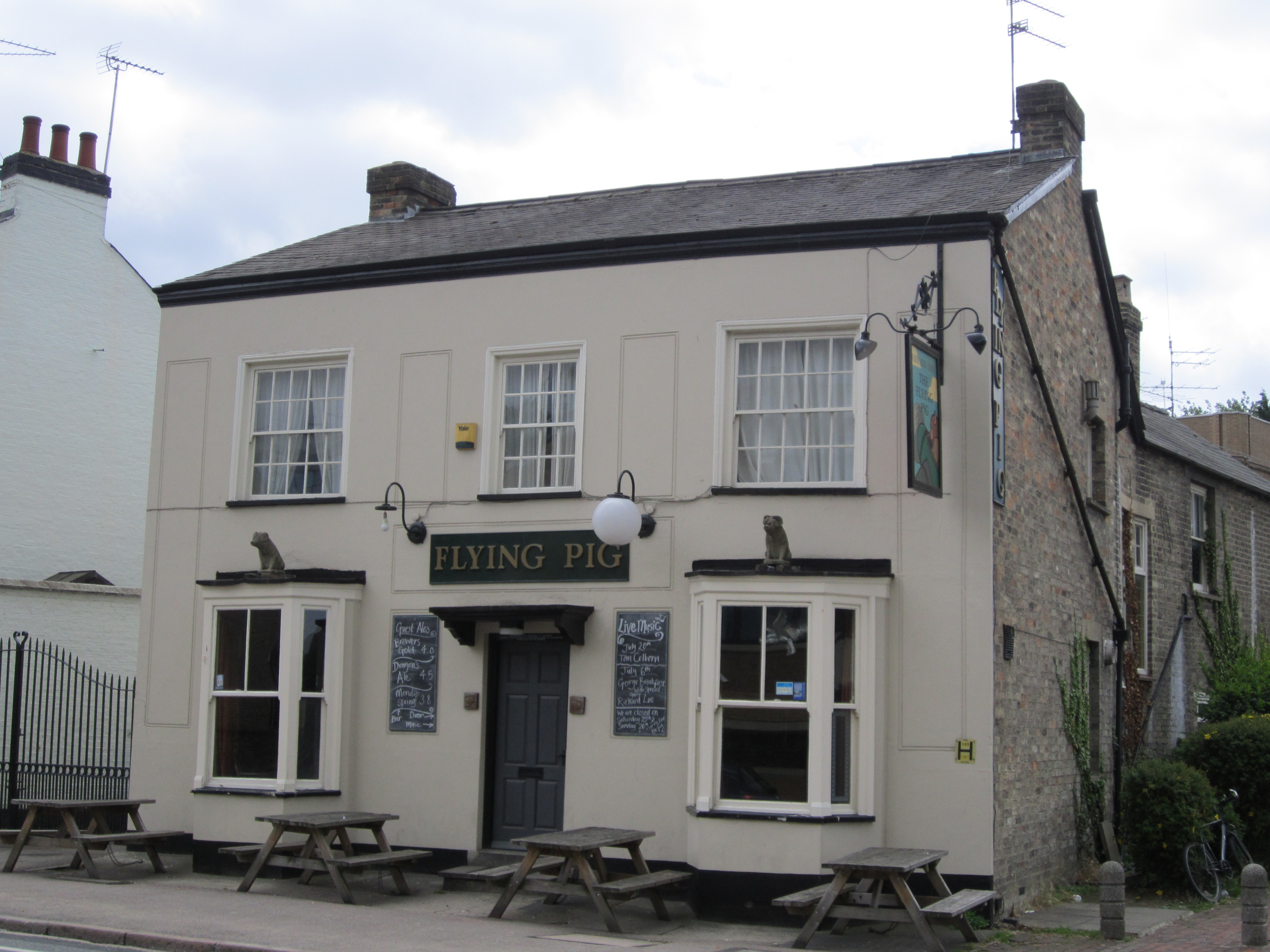
- In 2011
- Interactive map of the The Flying Pig area
- Former names: The Engineer, The Crown Inn

General information
- Location: 106 Hills Road, Cambridge
- Coordinates: 52.19447°N 0.13175°E

Website
- www.facebook.com/FlyingPigCambridge/

The Flying Pig was a public house in Hills Road, Cambridge.

It was first recorded as The Engineer in 1844 and then renamed The Crown Inn in 1860. It was renamed "The Flying Pig" by landlord Mick Clelford in the 1980s as he was a pilot and nicknamed "The Pig".

Customers have included Pink Floyd members Syd Barrett and David Gilmour, who met there, and mathematician Michael Guy.

In 2008, the local council approved plans to demolish The Flying Pig, but petitions and protests kept the pub open until October 2021, when The Pig closed its doors.

Since its closure in 2021, the Flying Pig pub in Cambridge has been the focus of significant planning activity. Initially, Pace Ltd's proposal to build new office blocks behind the pub was refused by Cambridge City Council, but this decision was overturned on appeal. Railway Pension Nominees Limited, with Socius as development manager, later amended the plans, reducing car parking spaces and increasing office space, which were approved by the city council in 2023. Developers have assured the pub's return, with messages like "pigs do fly, the flying pig pub will be back" displayed on site hoardings.

== See also ==
- Pigs on the Wing
