= Crown Point, Norwich =

Area in Norwich, England

Crown Point was originally the name given to an area in Trowse just to the south of the city of Norwich in England. It is most notable for Crown Point TMD.
