= Siloam Springs Downtown Historic District =

Historic district in Arkansas, United States

- U.S. National Register of Historic Places
- U.S. Historic district
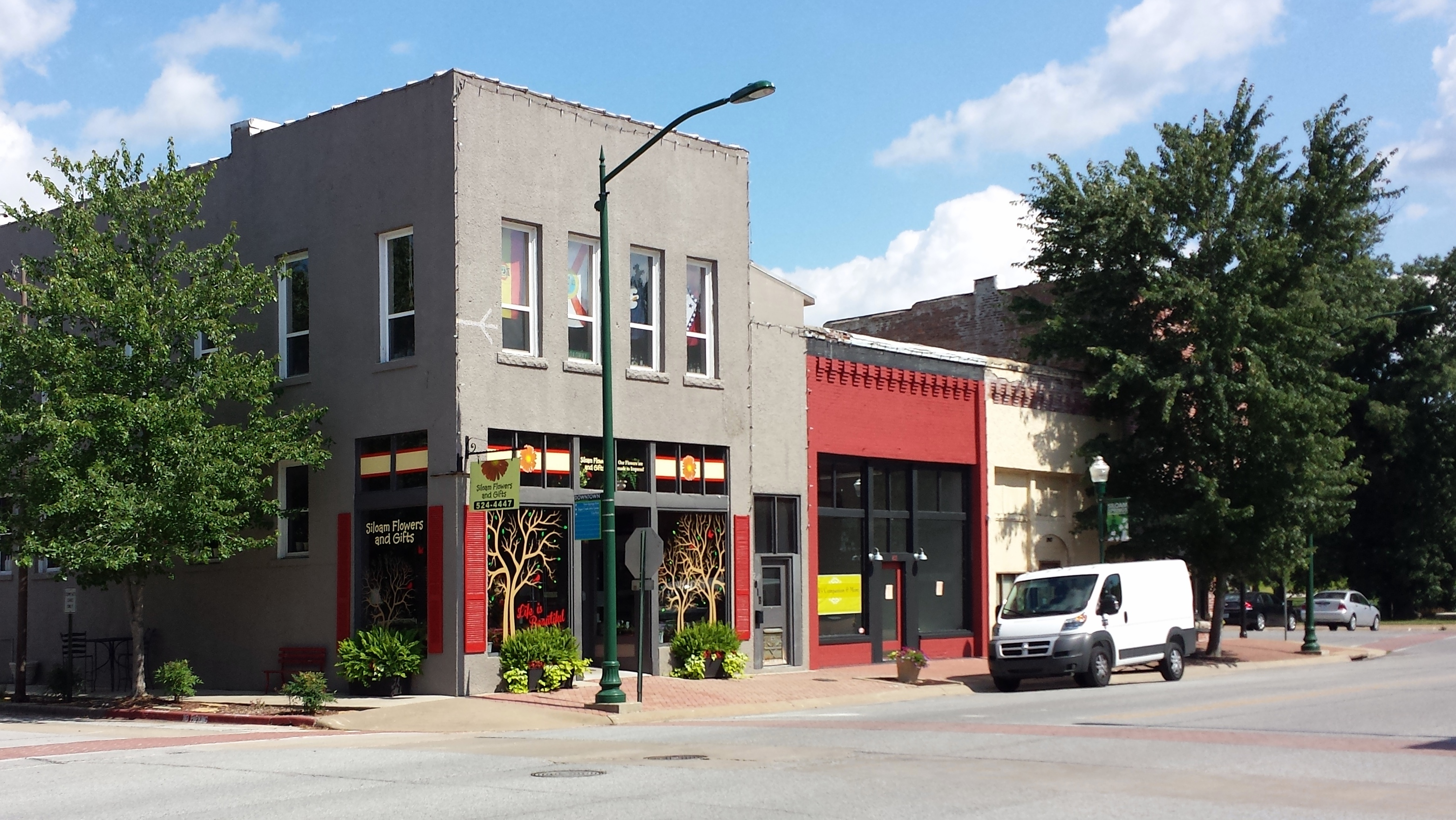

- Location within Arkansas Location within the United States
- Location: Roughly bounded by Sager Cr., Ashley St., Madison Ave. and Twin Springs St., Siloam Springs, Arkansas
- Area: 40 acres (16 ha)
- Architectural style: Classical Revival, Beaux Arts, Art Deco
- MPS: Benton County MRA
- NRHP reference No.: 94001338
- Added to NRHP: May 26, 1995

The Siloam Springs Downtown Historic District encompasses the historic downtown area of Siloam Springs, Arkansas. The district is roughly bounded by University Street, Broadway, and Sager Creek, with a few buildings on adjacent streets outside this triangular area. This business district was developed mainly between about 1896, when the railroad arrived, and 1940, and contains a significant number of buildings dating to that period. It also includes Siloam Springs City Park, the location of the springs that gave the city its name. Notable buildings include the First National Bank building, a c. 1890 Romanesque Revival building, and the c. 1881 Lakeside Hotel, which is one of the city's oldest commercial buildings.

The district was listed on the National Register of Historic Places in 1995.

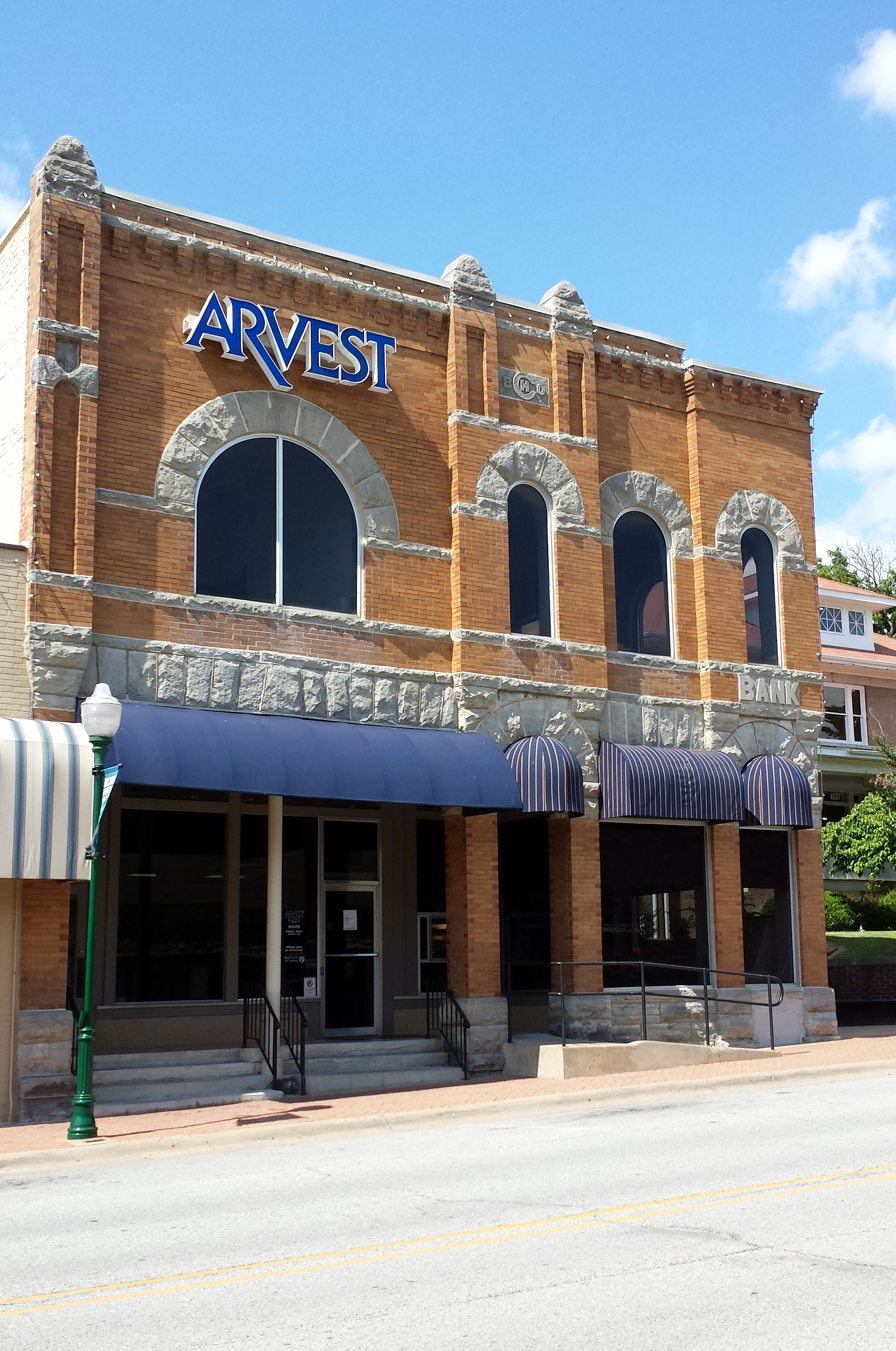
109 E. University, ca. 1890 Romanesque Revival structure

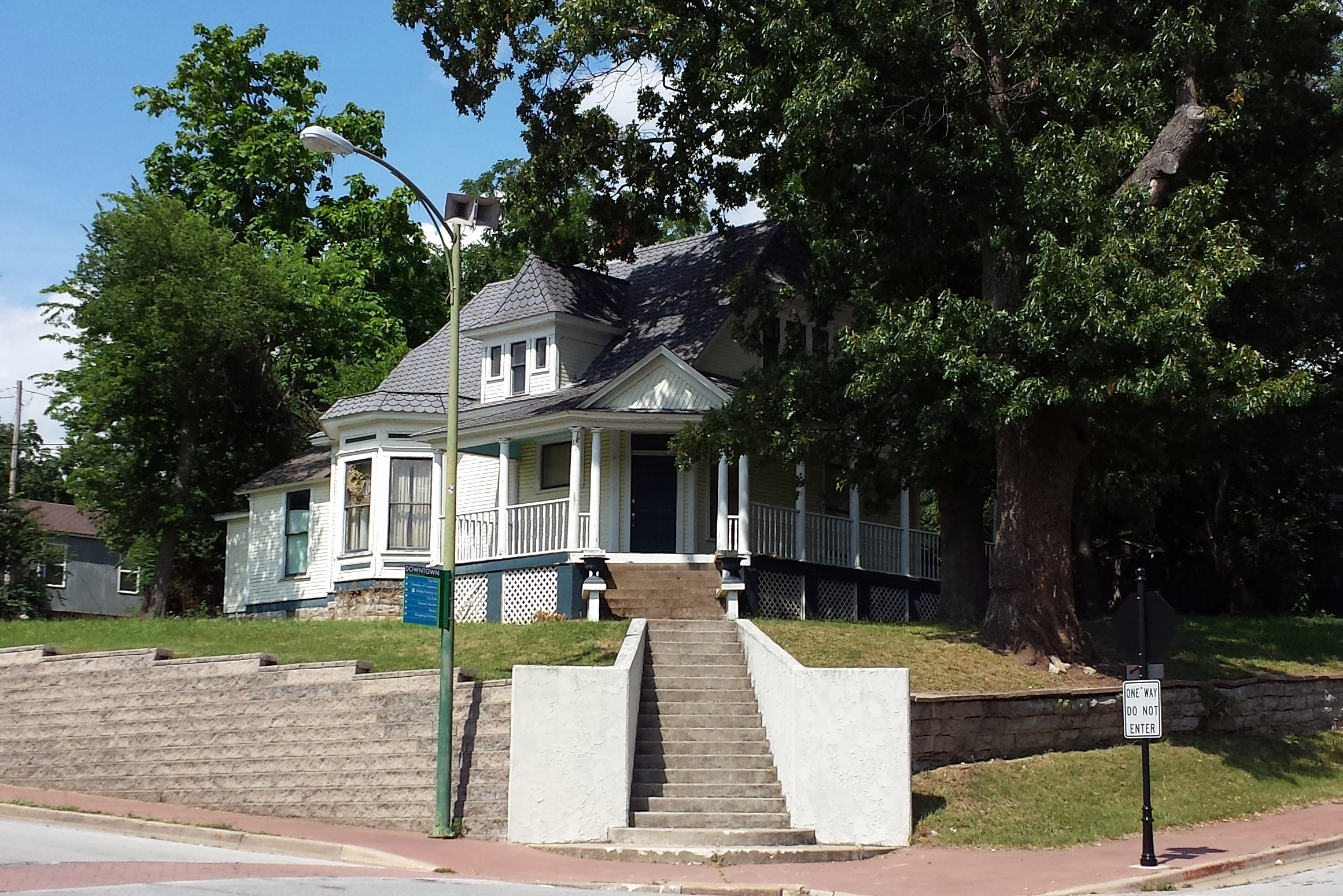
University & Broadway ca. 1900 residence with Queen Anne and Colonial Revival details

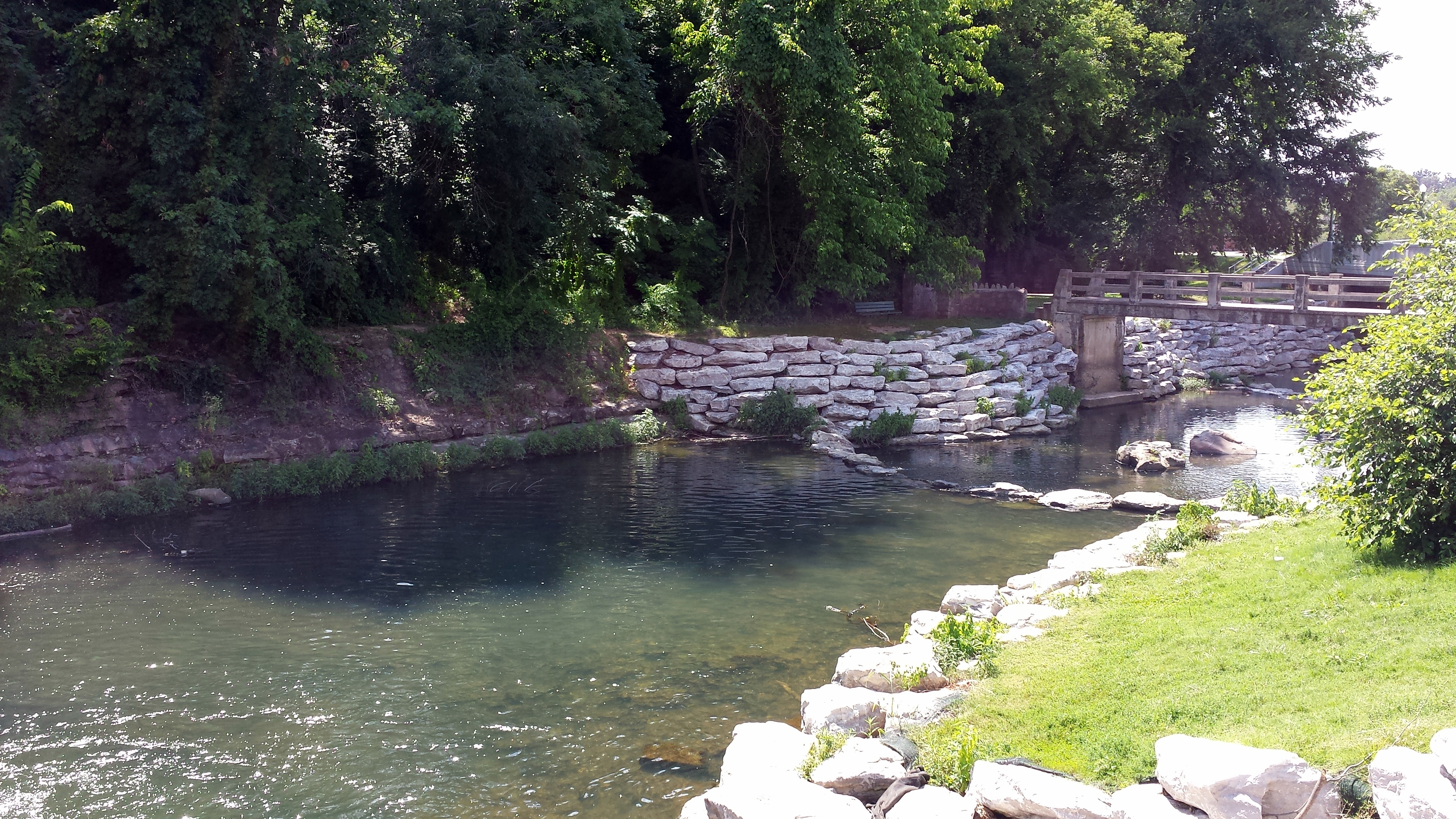
W. University & Mt. Olive ca. 1890 city park

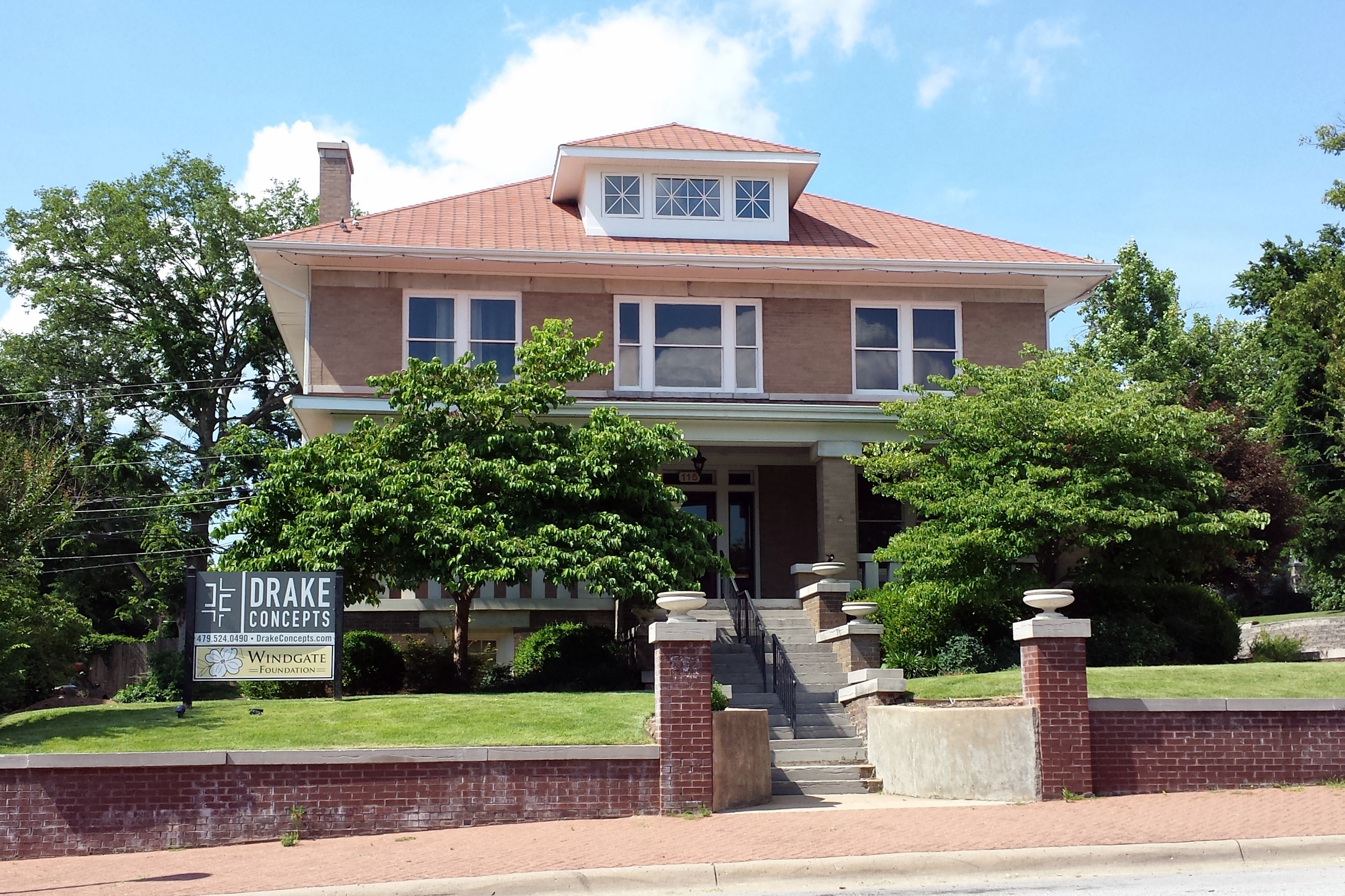
115 E. University ca. 1913 house with elements of Prairie, Craftsman, and Classical styles

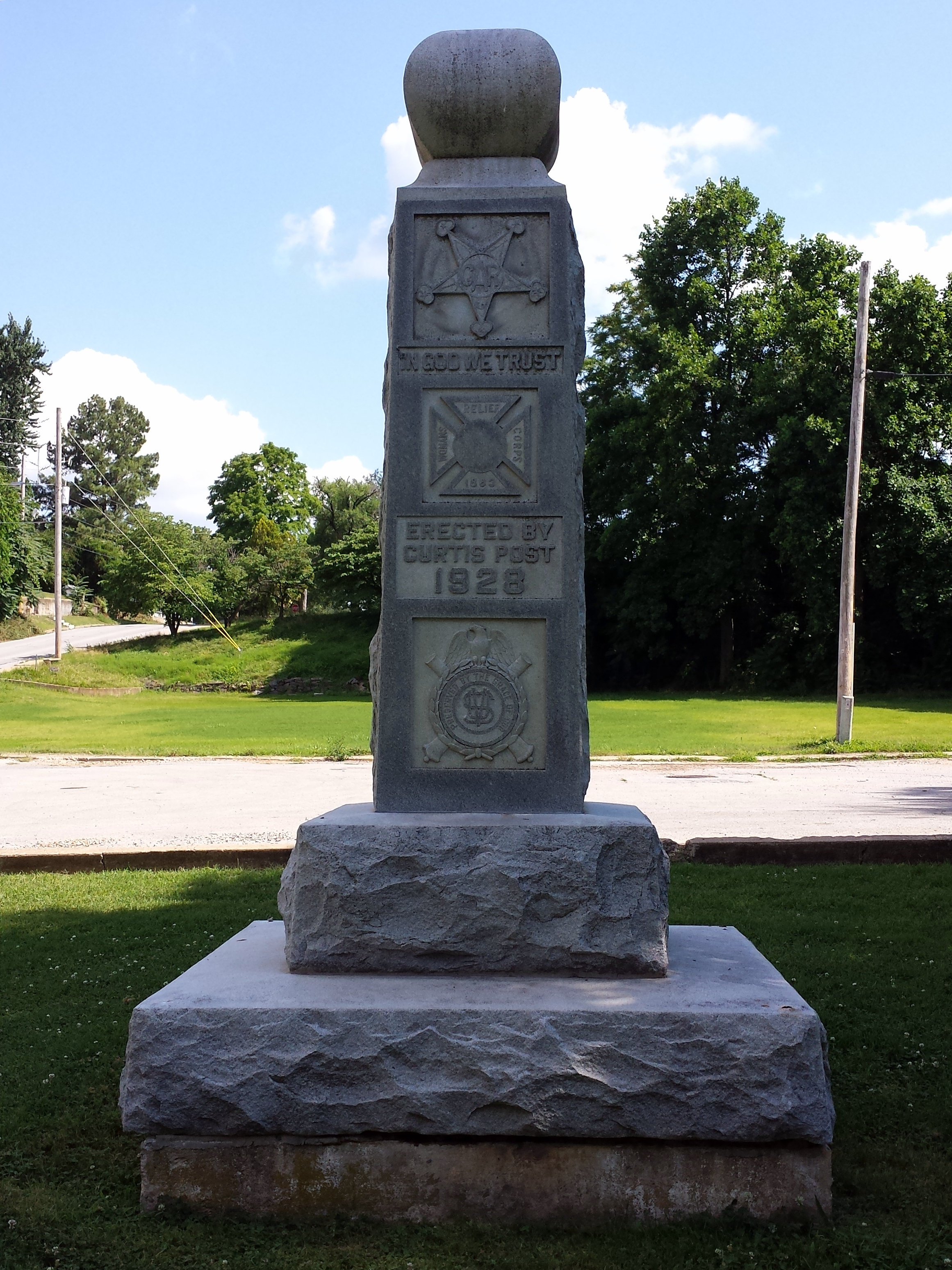
S end of Twin Springs Park 1928 commemorative monument

== See also ==
- National Register of Historic Places listings in Benton County, Arkansas
