= Country House Rescue =

British TV series

- Starring: Ruth Watson (2008–2011); Simon Davis (2012)
- Narrated by: Hugh Bonneville
- Country of origin: United Kingdom
- Original language: English
- No. of episodes: 40

Production
- Running time: 46 minutes
- Production company: Betty TV

Original release
- Network: Channel 4
- Release: 9 December 2008 – 20 July 2012

Country House Rescue is an observational documentary series which airs on British terrestrial television channel, Channel 4. The series has also aired on BBC Canada, ABC1 in Australia and Living in New Zealand and in South Africa.

In each episode, an expert visits a struggling country house and tries to turn its fortunes by giving advice and suggestions to the owner/s. The first three series saw Ruth Watson in this role. The fourth series, airing from June 2012, saw Simon Davis take the role.

The series premiered on 9 December 2008, and gained audiences of up to 2.7 million on its first run. In March 2009, it was reported that a second series of Country House Rescue featuring Ruth Watson had been commissioned by Channel 4, to be filmed in HD. The second series was originally planned to return for an extended 14-episode run, in early 2010, however three episodes (all revisits of houses previously featured) were brought forward, and aired during November and December 2009 as a mini-series. The second series of new episodes aired throughout Spring 2010, and the third series aired throughout Spring 2011. From August 2011, a further series of revisits of houses previously featured aired, though the series began with a previously unaired episode from series two. However, Watson stated on her own website that she would not present any more series of Country House Rescue in the future. In November 2011, Channel 4 announced that Simon Davis would present the 4th series to be broadcast in Spring 2012.

The series is narrated by Hugh Bonneville.

== Episodes ==
=== Series 1 (2008–09) ===
Episode #	Country House	First broadcast	Synopsis
1.	Cothay Manor	9 December 2008	Cothay Manor is a grade I listed medieval country house and gardens, located in Stawley, Somerset. In 1993 Mary-Anne and Alastair Robb bought the house as an empty shell and have spent all their time and funds restoring Cothay. However, as a business, the manor is losing a serious amount of money, and a question mark remains over who will take over the estate in the future. With the situation at a breaking point, can Ruth Watson turn the estate's fortunes round, and help secure Cothay's long-term future?
2.	Elmore Court	16 December 2008	Elmore Court is a grade II listed mansion, located in Elmore, Gloucestershire. The house has been the family seat of the Guise baronets for nearly 800 years. The current owner, dance DJ Anselm Guise, inherited the estate in 2007 from his uncle (who had often disapproved of his nephew's lifestyle), with the baronetcy going to Anselm's 77-year-old father. Now, Anselm's laid-back approach has led to the property's slow deterioration, so Ruth must inspire a sense of determination in the owner to save the mansion from falling even further into disrepair.
3.	Chesters	23 December 2008	Chesters is a grade I listed 17th-century country house and estate, located on the banks of the River Teviot in the Scottish Borders. The estate includes 1,500 acres (6.1 km^{2}) and 14 estate cottages, as well as a mile of the River Teviot. John and Ellie Henderson would like to leave their jobs in London and take up permanent residence at Chesters (John's ancestral home), but they are unable to afford to. Can Ruth help the couple make the estate profitable enough to achieve their dream?
4.	Albury Park	30 December 2008	Albury Park is a grade II listed country house with parkland, located in Albury, Surrey. Nigel and Jennifer Whalley bought the mansion in 2004, initially sharing the property with a number of elderly residents. However, the other residents soon moved on, forcing the Whalleys to buy their shares in the property, and leaving the couple £4 million in debt. Ruth devises a plan for a show flat to entice new investors to the estate to save the couple from financial ruin.
5.	Black Clauchrie House	6 January 2009	Black Clauchrie House is an Arts and Crafts style former hunting lodge, set in 14 acres (57,000 m^{2}) of grounds near Barrhill in South Ayrshire. Adrian and Caroline Goodall bought the property in 2004, but have yet to capitalise on their investment. Ruth tries to help the pair take advantage of their home's heritage, but will other professional commitments help destroy the couple's relationship, and put the future of Black Clauchrie House at risk?
6.	Pentillie	13 January 2009	Pentillie is a 17th-century castle and estate, located on the River Tamar, near St Mellion village in Cornwall. Pentillie has been the Coryton family seat since 1698, but current owners Ted and Sarah Coryton (who inherited the estate in 2007) were determined to sell it after various family disputes. However, Ted and Sarah have fallen in love with the castle and its grounds, and seek Ruth's professional advice to turn the estates fortunes around.

=== Country House Rescue Revisited (2009) ===
Episode #	Country House	First broadcast	Synopsis
1.	Cothay Manor	11 November 2009	Ruth Watson returns to Cothay Manor in Stawley, Somerset, and meets up with its owners, Mary-Anne and Alastair Robb. A year on, have the couple implemented Ruth's ideas for Cothay, including improved refreshment facilities and a 'Calendar of Events', and is the manor turning a profit? Ruth is also keen to find out if the difficult issue has been settled of who will run Cothay in the future.
2.	Albury Park	18 November 2009	A year after her visits to Albury Park, Ruth Watson returns to the country house in Albury, Surrey, and catches up with owners, Nigel and Jennifer Whalley. Ruth wants to know if any new investors have been attracted to the estate since her last visit, and are the couple more financially secure? Ruth also discovers that Albury Park is now promoted as a wedding venue.
3.	Black Clauchrie House	1 December 2009	Ruth Watson catches up with Adrian and Caroline Goodall, owners of Black Clauchrie House in Barhill, South Ayrshire. A year after her last visit, have the couple followed Ruth's suggestions and revitalised the house as a business? Ruth also hopes that the couple have come through their previous troubles for the good of their relationship, as well as Black Clauchrie.

=== Series 2 (2010) ===
Episode #	Country House	First broadcast	Synopsis
1.	Plas Teg	4 March 2010	Plas Teg is a grade I listed Jacobean mansion, located near Pontblyddyn in Flintshire. For most of the 20th Century the house lay derelict. In 1986 Cornelia Bayley purchased Plas Teg, and poured her life and finances into the house. But the constant maintenance of the old building and estate has isolated Cornelia, and funds are at an all-time low. Ruth Watson advises her to offer out the house as a location for film and photo shoots, but Cornelia is worried about strangers harming her beautiful home.
2.	Riverhill House	11 March 2010	Riverhill House is a grade II listed rag-stone manor house, located in Sevenoaks, Kent. The house and estate were first developed in 1714, but were taken over by John Rogers in 1814. Today, four generations of the Rogers family live at Riverhill House, but the once treasured property has fallen into disrepair and needs a cash injection fast. Can Ruth persuade current heir Ed and his wife Sarah, as well as owner and director Jane Margaret Rogers to agree on a way forward for the historic estate?
3.	Carnfield Hall	18 March 2010	Carnfield Hall is a country house with 90 acres (360,000 m^{2}) of parkland, located between Alfreton and South Normanton in Derbyshire. A hotchpotch of Elizabethan, Jacobean and Victorian architecture, the hall was abandoned in 1960 due to mining subsidence. James Cartland bought Carnfield in 1987 and has restored the house single-handed. However, with the gardens and woodland still in need of restoration, Ruth's guidance is needed to help James make Carnfield more profitable.
4.	The Heath House	26 March 2010	The Heath House is a Gothic Revival mansion and estate located in Tean, Staffordshire. Despite the estate being owned by the Philips family for generations, current owners John and Flavia Phillips are in their seventies and want to sell up, as the property is becoming a financial and physical drain. Eldest son Ben wants to keep the estate in the Philips family, so can Ruth come up with some ideas to make The Heath House financially viable in the long term?
5.	Kelly House	1 April 2010	Kelly House is a grade I listed manor house and estate located in the village of Kelly, Devon, overlooking Bodmin Moor. Members of the Kelly family have lived in the house for nearly one thousand years, but today their historic home is crumbling around them. Ruth suggests a plan that enables some conservation and reconstruction of the building to be done quickly, while also looking at revenue opportunities for the family to maintain Kelly House into the future.
6.	Whitbourne Hall	8 April 2010	Whitbourne Hall is a grade II* listed neo-Palladian country house located in the village of Whitbourne, Herefordshire. The hall was converted into 23 flats in the 1970s, but has fallen into disrepair, and residents cannot agree on how to raise cash for repairs. Ruth suggests creating a luxury campsite in the surrounding gardens of the hall, as well as maximising its use as a wedding venue. But with so many residents having to agree to Ruth's ideas, will a plan of action for the crumbling house ever be acted upon?
7.	Abbey Dore Court	15 April 2010	Abbey Dore Court is a Victorian country house and gardens located in the village of Abbey Dore, Herefordshire. Constructed in the late 19th century on the site of the former public house, Charis Ward bought the property in 1967, and converted the grounds into a plantsman's garden. Though the gardens are a popular attraction, the house has recently fallen into disrepair, and Charis's granddaughter Clare is determined to turn the formerly happy home around, with a little help from Ruth Watson.

=== Series 3 (2011) ===
Episode #	Country House	First broadcast	Synopsis
1.	Wyresdale Hall	6 March 2011	Wyresdale Hall is a grade II listed country house, situated in an estate of 1,000 acres near the village of Scorton in Lancashire, England. James Whewell has been building up the estate since 1967 and has been continuing the farming, shooting and fishing traditions on the estate, but needs Ruth's help to stop his son Jim seeing it as a money pit. Can she help integrate James's traditional views with Jim's modern outlook?
2.	Tapeley Park	13 March 2011	Tapeley Park is a mansion located near Westleigh, Devon, that has been in the Christie family for 300 odd years. Current owner, Hector Christie was running Tapeley as a quasi-commune, but has now called on Ruth Watson to help turn the crumbling mansion's destiny around. Tapley has one of the largest collections of William Morris furniture in existence, and Ruth suggests that Hector should capitalise on this as well as the gardens of Tapley to secure the future of the mansion.
3.	Monreith House	20 March 2011	Monreith House is a category A listed Georgian mansion located near Port William in Dumfries and Galloway. Sir Michael Maxwell inherited Monreith in the early 1980s from his uncle, who had taken the view that it would be cheaper for the grand property to fall down rather than to pay to have it demolished. Ruth finds Sir Michael's inability to do things to a high standard infuriating, and believes the answer to Monreith's problems may lie in a much needed feminine touch. Has Ruth taken on the challenge to find Sir Michael a wife as well as trying to keep Monreith standing?
4.	Trereife House	27 March 2011	Trereife House is a grade II listed Manor house located near Penzance in Cornwall. Tim Le Grice inherited the house in 1986, and has struggled to keep his family home from falling apart ever since. His children, Peter and Georgina, are keen to take over the running of Trereife, but Tim is reluctant to pass on the burden. Ruth sees Trereife's potential for becoming a B & B and a site for literary and poetry events, but has to persuade Tim to relinquish control and give his children a chance to make to house a success.
5.	Kentchurch Court	3 April 2011	Kentchurch Court is a grade I listed Stately home located near Kentchurch in Herefordshire, and has been handed down through the Scudamore family since 1058. Current owner Jan Lucas-Scudamore is finding Kentchurch increasingly difficult to run, and her son Joss wants to gain life and business skills before he takes over. Kentchurch Court is one of the most historically important houses Ruth has ever worked with, and she believes that opening up the house more to the public will save it for the family. However, can Ruth persuade Jan of this, and get Joss to play a more active part in the running of the house?
6.	Garston Manor aka High Elms Manor	10 April 2011	Garston Manor is a grade II listed Georgian country house located near Abbots Langley in Hertfordshire. Sheila O'Neill bought the house as a wreck from the local council and turned Garston Manor into a Montessori school. Thirteen years later the house is just about breaking even. Ruth encourages Sheila and her four daughters to take separate responsibility for different tasks and schemes to improve the manor, including a new terrace, improved gardens, a woodland treasure hunt and a UFO academy. However, will these new ventures make any money?
7.	Hill Place	17 April 2011	Hill Place is a grade II listed Georgian country villa located near Swanmore in Hampshire. Since inheriting Hill Place, Will and Rebecca Dobson have given up their home and their jobs to concentrate on the expensive and urgent repairs needed, as well trying to make the estate work as a commercial business. Ruth encourages them to relocate and leave the whole of Hill Place open for money-making schemes, including special weekends for upmarket brides. However, Ruth also has to contend with Will's mother and her siblings who are critical of the plans.
8.	Pen-Y-Lan Hall	24 April 2011	Pen-Y-Lan Hall is a grade II listed Regency Gothic mansion located in Ruabon near Wrexham in Wales. It was built in 1690 by the founder of Lloyds Bank and was bought by the Holloway family in 1849, since when the house has passed down five generations of the family. The current owner, Emma Holloway, has lived in the house all her life and raised her four children there. Ruth Watson suggests using the house's stables and land for equestrian events, and the dining room as a pop-up restaurant – but Emma Holloway is not happy with having strangers in the house. Instead she comes up with her own alternative idea – residential art classes for six weeks of the year. But will this be enough to save Pen-Y-Lan?

=== Country House Rescue Revisited (2011) ===
Episode #	Country House	First broadcast	Synopsis
1.	Gissing Hall	18 August 2011	Gissing Hall is a listed 19th century mansion, situated in fife acres of woodland and gardens in the village of Gissing in Norfolk, England. After falling into disrepair after years of neglect, William and Ann Brennan bought the property in 1986, with the intention of restoring it as a family home. However, finincial constraints forced the Brennans to open the hall as a hotel. The hotel is struggling however, and Ruth Watson suggests new interior designs and a renewed focus on weddings and events at Gissing Hall to bring in revenue. Ruth also suggests that an experienced general manager should be recruited to help run the hall as a successful business.
2.	Chesters	25 August 2011	Ruth Watson returns to Chesters in the Scottish Borders and meets up with its owners, John and Ellie Henderson. When Ruth was last at Chesters, the house was in a parlous state, and needed huge amounts of money to be spent on it to save it for the future. Have the Hendersons taken Ruth's advice in order make Chesters a viable proposition? And have they managed to move from London to live at the estate permanently?
3.	Pentillie	1 September 2011	When Ruth Watson first visited Pentillie in Cornwall, Ted and Sarah Coryton (who inherited the estate in 2007) were encouraged to renovate the interior of the property for a bed and breakfast business and exclusive hire. Ruth also suggested that the couple open up the estate's gardens for guided tours. Now Ruth has returned to Pentillie, she is keen to find out if her suggestions have been put into practice, and have they been a success?
4.	Elmore Court	8 September 2011	Ruth Watson catches up with Anselm Guise, owner of Elmore Court in Elmore, Gloucestershire. On Ruth's first visit, she encouraged Anselm's idea of starting a cookery school at Elmore Court to bring in some much needed revenue to the crumbling estate. Has Anselm taken Ruth's advice, and made the cookery school a success? Ruth is also keen to find out if Anselm has taken a more responsible and urgent approach to saving his ancestral home from ruin?
5.	Abbey Dore Court	15 September 2011	Ruth Watson returns to Abbey Dore Court in Abbey Dore, Herefordshire and catches up with owner Charis Ward. Although the court's gardens were already a popular attraction, Ruth initially suggested Charis and his granddaughter Clare that they start up a bed and breakfast business to fund repairs and restoration of Abbey Dore. However, Charis and Clare rejected this idea, and are keen to show Ruth the self-catering holiday business which they have started instead.
6.	The Heath House	22 September 2011	When Ruth Watson first visited The Heath House in Tean, Staffordshire, Ben, the eldest son of John and Flavia Phillips was trying to persuade his parents against selling their ancestral home. Ruth wants to know if plans to turn the estate into a wedding venue have been a success, and whether Ben's work has managed to make Heath House turn a profit for the family instead of being a financial burden?
7.	Plas Teg	29 September 2011	Ruth Watson catches up with Cornelia Bayley, owner of Plas Teg in Pontblyddyn, Flintshire. On Ruth's first visit, she suggested that Cornelia rent Plas Teg out as a location for film and photo shoots, which would pay for the maintenance of the mansion. However, Cornelia was nervous that strangers would damage her home. Now Ruth returns to see if Cornelia has allowed the public to enjoy Plas Teg, and bring in much needed money to the property.
8.	Riverhill House	6 October 2011	Ruth Watson returns to Riverhill House in Sevenoaks, Kent, and catches up with owners Ed, Sarah and Jane Margaret Rogers. When Ruth first visited, the family were struggling to come to agreement on how to fund repairs to house and estate. Ruth wants to see if Ed and Sarah's schemes for a maze, a 'Himalayan Hideout' and a new souvenir shop have proved successful, and how does Jane Margaret feel about the new developments?
9.	Hill Place	13 October 2011	When Ruth Watson first visited Hill Place near Swanmore in Hampshire, owners Will and Rebecca Dobson were struggling to deal with expensive and urgent repairs at the house, as well as criticism of their plans from Will's mother and her siblings. Now Ruth wants to see if schemes to turn Hill Place into an up-market wedding venue have been a success, and to see if the peace deal that she brokered with the family has held.

=== Series 4 (2012) ===
Episode #	Country house	First broadcast	Synopsis
1.	Colebrooke Park	14 June 2012	Colebrooke House is a B+ listed neo-classical country house, built in 1820, and situated in an estate of 1,000 acres near the village of Brookeborough in County Fermanagh, Northern Ireland. Alan and Janet, Viscount and Viscountess Brookeborough, have lived in the mansion for over 30 years, having rescued the property from near ruin, and devoting their lives to maintaining the house, raising the funds they need by hosting exclusive shooting parties. But their work isn't sustainable. Simon Davis believes the answer lies in the conversion of the house and grounds into a health and well-being business that includes a spa in the former stable. Yet Alan and Janet are reluctant to open their home to strangers.
2.	Chapel Cleeve Manor	21 June 2012	Chapel Cleeve is a Grade II listed manor house in West Somerset, dating back to the 15th century. Over the centuries, the house has passed through many families as well as serving as a refuge for pilgrims, and more recently as a hotel. In 1998, Jeannie Wilkins and her partner bought Chapel Cleeve for £360,000. They enlisted the help of friends to renovate it, but after 33 years together they parted ways, and now 63-year-old Jeannie lives on her own in this 15-bedroom house and survives on £100 per week. On the verge of bankruptcy but desperate to safeguard this important part of Britain's heritage, Jeannie calls on the expertise of businessman Simon Davis. Can he find the radical solutions that will help Jeannie continue to live in her beloved home, and will she be willing to share the house with others if it's the only way to ensure its survival?
3.	Bantry House	5 July 2012	Bantry House is a historic house in Bantry, County Cork, Ireland constructed in about 1700. The house has been in the Shelswell-White family for over 300 years. Egerton and Brigitte Shelswell-White came to live here more than 30 years ago. Turning the semi-derelict Bantry into a family home and a viable business has been their life's work. But now their eldest daughter Sophie and her partner Josh have given up their life in Australia to come back and take over running the whole estate. The house currently brings in a seasonal income from bed and breakfast, a tea room and house tours, but it's not enough. With emotions running high and very little money to spend, Simon Davis must call on all his powers of negotiation to come up with a solution.
4.	Great Fulford	6 July 2012	Great Fulford is a Grade I listed manor house near Exeter in Devon. Set in 3000 acres, Great Fulford is home to Francis and Kishanda Fulford, previously seen on Channel 4 in The F***ing Fulfords in 2004. The future of Great Fulford is hanging in the balance. Parts of the house haven't been touched for decades and other parts are starting to crumble. With the income from the estate and tenanted farms going towards paying off borrowings, the house must start to pay its own way. Simon believes that the huge formal rooms and recently renovated bedrooms mean that the couple are sitting on a goldmine. But will they listen to Simon's advice, or will the couple's forceful personalities leave them at loggerheads?
5.	Meldon Park	13 July 2012	Meldon Park is a Grade II listed building in Northumberland. Simon visits the Cookson family and tries to persuade them to make a go of running a money-making café in the estate's walled garden. Five miles from Morpeth in Northumberland, Meldon Park has been a home to the Cooksons since 1832. Successive generations have seen the family's fortunes wax and wane, and with it the size of the estate. Income is no longer keeping up with the escalating running costs, parts of the house are starting to crumble, and time is running out. It has fallen to James Cookson and his wife Emily to try to turn it around. Can Simon Davis help?
6.	Craufurdland Castle	20 July 2012	Craufurdland is a castle in Kilmarnock, Ayrshire dating back over eight centuries. It's been home to the Craufurd family since 1245, but constant maintenance of the fragile property has become a huge financial drain. Having rented it out for the last few years, Simon Craufurd and his wife Adity have just moved in, hoping to reclaim the family home for them and their children. But with only enough money to sustain them for six months, they must quickly make it earn its keep. Simon Davis is keen to discover a way of sharing the castle's fascinating and important history with a public, who have no idea that it exists. Can he convince the Craufurds to support his business plan?
