= Whitbourne =

Whitbourne may refer to:

== Places ==
- Whitbourne, Herefordshire, England
- Whitbourne, Newfoundland and Labrador, Canada
- Whitbourne Moor, Wiltshire, England

== People with the surname ==
- Bill Whitbourne (1902–1970), Australian rules footballer
- Richard Whitbourne (1561–1635), English colonist, mariner and author

== Other uses ==
- Whitbourne Hall, country house in Whitbourne, Herefordshire, England
