= Black Clauchrie House =

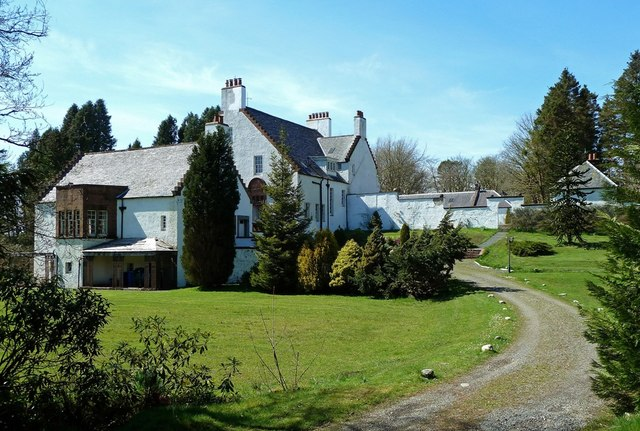
- Black Clauchrie House
- Interactive map of the Black Clauchrie House area

General information
- Type: Manor house
- Architectural style: Arts and Crafts
- Location: Barrhill, South Ayrshire, Scotland, United Kingdom
- Coordinates: 55.1232°N 4.6704°W
- Construction started: 1898
- Completed: 1901
- Owner: unknown

Design and construction
- Architect: James K. Hunter

Black Clauchrie House is a late Victorian manor house, located on the outskirts of the village of Barrhill in South Ayrshire, Scotland, adjacent to the Galloway Forest Park. It is protected as a category C(s) listed building.

It was originally built as a hunting lodge between 1898 and 1901 in the Arts and Crafts style for Robert David Jardine Mein-Austin (1864–1910) and his wife Flora. The house was designed by the Ayrshire-based architect James K. Hunter (1863–1929). Some of its features include a wood-beamed glass house, a ballroom and a minstrels' gallery. Some of the house was taken down by owners Richard Akerman and Yvonne Hawker before 2003. Originally part of a 7,500-acre (30 km^{2}) estate, it is now set in 14 acres (57,000 m^{2}) of land.

In 2009, Black Clauchrie House was the subject of a Channel 4 television documentary presented by hotelier Ruth Watson as part of the Country House Rescue series.

== Sources ==
- Davis, Michael C (1991). The Castles and Mansions of Ayrshire. Ardrishaig, Argyll.
