= List of The Hotel Inspector episodes =

The Hotel Inspector is an observational documentary television series which is broadcast on the British terrestrial television station, Channel 5, and by other networks around the world. Since 2008, each episode sees celebrated hotelier and businesswoman Alex Polizzi visit a struggling British hotel and try to turn its fortunes by giving advice and suggestions to the owner. Between 2005 and 2008, Ruth Watson was featured in this role.

== Series overview ==
Series	Episodes	Originally released	
Series	Episodes	First released	Last released
1	3	29 September 2005	13 October 2005
2	8	6 July 2006	24 August 2006
3	10	6 September 2007	8 November 2007
Revisited	5	21 May 2008	18 June 2008
4	6	10 June 2008	15 July 2008
5	8	6 July 2009	24 August 2009
6	6	22 July 2010	26 August 2010
7	8	18 April 2011	6 June 2011
8	8	3 October 2011	21 November 2011
9	10	5 July 2012	6 September 2012
Returns	4	18 July 2013	8 August 2013
10	8	6 February 2014	27 March 2014
Returns	4	25 June 2014	16 July 2014
11	8	9 April 2015	28 May 2015
Returns	4	1 September 2015	22 September 2015
12	8	1 June 2016	20 July 2016
Returns	2	30 August 2016	6 September 2016
13	5	27 June 2017	25 July 2017
CI, CO	4	5 September 2017	17 December 2017
14	7	5 June 2018	17 July 2018
15	8	6 June 2019	10 December 2019
16	8	10 June 2021	5 August 2021
17	8	16 June 2022	11 August 2022
18	4	10 October 2023	31 October 2023
19	12	28 March 2024	27 June 2024
20	8	17 July 2025	11 September 2025
21	8	26 February 2026	21 May 2026

== Episodes ==
=== Series 1 (2005) ===
No. overall	No. in series	Establishment	Original release date	UK viewers (millions)
1	1	"Nandos / Forget-Me-Not Guest House"	29 September 2005	1.320
Hotelier Ruth Watson meets a married couple who sold their family home and poured all their savings into Nando's, a six-room B and B in upmarket Stratford-on-Avon. However, things are not going well: Kate and John face fierce competition and despite them working "24/7", Nando's is the only B and B in the street not to have an RAC diamond rating.
2	2	"Hanmer Arms"	5 October 2005	1.350
Ruth Watson meets Keith and Val Morris, who three and a half years ago bought the Hanmer Arms, a classy 23-bed hotel/pub/restaurant/conference centre in Wrexham County Borough. Family members have invested £1 million of their money in the business, and now they want to see a return.
3	3	"Worlington Hall Hotel"	13 October 2005	1.600
Ruth Watson meets sisters Sharon and Joy, who have bought Worlington Hall, a Grade II-listed 16th-century hotel in the Suffolk countryside. However, their lack of previous experience has been cruelly exposed and the place they call the 'money pit' is suffering major losses. It is not just their money on the line – their mum has no pension and has invested most of her life savings in the project.

=== Series 2 (2006) ===
No. overall	No. in series	Establishment	Original release date	UK viewers (millions)
4	1	"Saxonia Guest House"	6 July 2006	1.480
Ruth Watson visits a three-diamond, eight-bed guesthouse in Weston-super-Mare run by hoteliers Jon and Sandie Harrap. The hotel is stuck in a time warp with tired décor, a cluttered lounge and tasteless bric-a-brac on every surface. They've called in Ruth because they've run out of ideas but her firm approach takes them both by surprise.
5	2	"Langtry Manor Hotel"	13 July 2006	1.630
Ruth visits Langtry Manor, a three-star hotel in Bournemouth. Originally built by King Edward VII for his mistress, actress Lillie Langtry, it was bought by Pamela Howard 30 years ago and has been run as a hotel by her and her family ever since. The fact that it's a family business is a strength, but it could also be the reason for some of the challenges it faces.
6	3	"Key West Hotel"	20 July 2006	1.600
Ruth visits Key West, which is owned by Brian and Gill Scott. The couple decided to retire to Newquay in Cornwall to live out their twilight years running a small hotel together. Sadly their dream has turned into a nightmare – they're overrun by rowdy stags and hens that destroy the rooms.
7	4	"Sparkles Hotel"	27 July 2006	1.590
Ruth takes a trip to a children's themed hotel in Blackpool. It's the brainchild of owner and manager Sue Ryan, AKA Mrs Sparkle, a former teacher who has spent seven years and more than £1m turning a rundown terraced house into her fantasy hotel. It now boasts a Narnia suite, a 101 Dalmatians suite and a Lost City of Atlantis breakfast room but, despite its prime location near the Pleasure Beach, it is distinctly lacking in guests. "If can't make a profit this year, I'd better throw in the towel," admits the larger-than-life Sue.
8	5	"Blossoms Guest House"	3 August 2006	1.860
Guesthouse owner Richard Nunns can't understand why he repeatedly gets complaints from outraged customers. It doesn't take Ruth long to identify Richard's first problem – the unsightly anaglypta wallpaper inside fails to match up to the lovely exterior.
9	6	"Tasburgh House Hotel"	10 August 2006	2.010
Ruth Watson visits the award-winning Tasburgh Hotel in Bath in a bid to discover why the establishment has a distinct lack of guests. She meets the B&B's owner Sue, and tries to convince her that no amount of classy decor can make up for the cramped bedrooms full of soft toys, dingy bathrooms, poor presentation and a steep starting price of £110 per night.
10	7	"Hanmer Arms (Revisited)"	17 August 2006	2.120
The Hotel Inspector revisits married couple Keith and Val Morris, who she first met during the first series.
11	8	"Worlington Hall Hotel (Revisited)"	24 August 2006	N/A
The Hotel Inspector revisits sisters Joy and Sharon, who bought a Grade II-listed 16th-century hotel in the Suffolk countryside.

=== Series 3 (2007) ===
No. overall	No. in series	Establishment	Original release date	UK viewers (millions)
12	1	"Grand Hotel"	6 September 2007	1.430
Ruth travels to Hastings to try and transform the Grand Hotel.
13	2	"Beech House"	13 September 2007	1.390
Ruth travels to Reading to try and transform the Beech House.
14	3	"Safari Hotel"	20 September 2007	N/A
Ruth travels to Bournemouth to try and transform the Safari Hotel.
15	4	"Butley Priory"	27 September 2007	1.490
Ruth travels to Suffolk to try and transform the Butley Priory.
16	5	"Weyanoke / East Beach Hotel"	4 October 2007	N/A
Ruth travels to Eastbourne to try and transform the Weyanoke / East Beach Hotel.
17	6	"St Alfeges / Number 16 B&B"	11 October 2007	1.440
Ruth travels to Greenwich to try and transform the St Alfeges / Number 16 B&B.
18	7	"Haven Hotel / No.78 B&B"	18 October 2007	1.530
Ruth travels to Great Yarmouth to try and transform the Haven Hotel / No.78 B&B.
19	8	"Woodlands Lodge Hotel"	25 October 2007	N/A
Ruth travels to New Forest to try and transform the Woodlands Lodge Hotel.
20	9	"Key West Hotel (Revisited)"	1 November 2007	1.810
Ruth revisits Newquay to see how Key West Hotel is getting on since her visit.
21	10	"Tasburgh House Hotel (Revisited)"	8 November 2007	N/A
Ruth revisits Bath to see how Tasburgh House Hotel is getting on since her visit.

=== The Hotel Inspector: Revisited (2008) ===
This is a miniseries consisting entirely of revisits to hotels featured in the previous three series.

No. overall	No. in series	Establishment	Original release date	UK viewers (millions)
22	1	"Langtry Manor Hotel (Revisited)"	21 May 2008	N/A
Ruth revisits Bournemouth to see how Langtry Manor Hotel is getting after 2 years since her last visit.
23	2	"St Alfeges / Number 16 B&B (Revisited)"	28 May 2008	N/A
Ruth revisits Greenwich to see how St Alfeges / Number 16 B&B is getting on since her last visit.
24	3	"Grand Hotel (Revisited)"	4 June 2008	N/A
Ruth revisits Hastings to see how Grand Hotel is getting on since her last visit.
25	4	"Haven Hotel / No.78 B&B (Revisited)"	11 June 2008	N/A
Ruth revisits Great Yarmouth to see how Haven Hotel / No.78 B&B is getting on since her last visit.
26	5	"Weyanoke / East Beach Hotel (Revisited)"	18 June 2008	1.040
Ruth revisits Eastbourne to see how Weyanoke / East Beach Hotel is getting on since her last visit.

=== Series 4 (2008) ===
Series 4 premiered on 10 July 2008 at 9 pm on Five, with the spin-off series, The Hotel Inspector Unseen following on Fiver at 10 pm. Series 4 saw Alex Polizzi replace Ruth Watson as The Hotel Inspector.

No. overall	No. in series	Establishment	Original release date	UK viewers (millions)
27	1	"Brecon Castle Hotel"	10 July 2008	1.290
Alex travels to Brecon to try and transform the Brecon Castle, what is reputed to be the oldest hotel in Wales.
28	2	"The Lenchford Inn"	17 July 2008	1.090
Alex travels to Worcester to try and transform The Lenchford Inn where their poor quality restaurant and ill-defined management roles are the problems.
29	3	"Jessop House Hotel"	24 July 2008	1.260
Alex travels to Tewkesbury to try and transform the Jessop House Hotel.
30	4	"West Usk Lighthouse B&B"	31 July 2008	1.660
Alex travels to Newport to try and transform the West Usk Lighthouse, which was once voted Britain's most romantic B&B.
31	5	"Number Nine B&B"	7 August 2008	1.640
Alex travels to Torquay to try and transform the Number Nine by relaunching the establishment as a 1950s-style B&B.
32	6	"Garden Lodge Guest house"	14 August 2008	1.230
Alex travels to Kent to try and transform the Garden Lodge Guest house.

=== Series 5 (2009) ===
No. overall	No. in series	Establishment	Original release date	UK viewers (millions)
33	1	"The Crown Inn"	6 July 2009	1.769
No-nonsense hotelier Alex Polizzi comes face to face with one of the worst establishments she has ever visited – the Crown Inn in Lewes. After a string of terrible internet reviews and the loss of a precious star in the Visit England ratings, Alex aims to restore this filthy guesthouse to its former glory.
34	2	"The Walpole Bay Hotel"	13 July 2009	1.584
Alex visits the Walpole Bay, an Edwardian hotel in Margate that is rapidly reaching crisis point. She tries to talk some sense into the feuding family owners and give this fading venture a brighter future.
35	3	"Sunnyside Hotel / Langtrys Blackpool"	20 July 2009	1.922
Alex Polizzi attempts to help the struggling Sunnyside Hotel in Blackpool. In a bid to boost the B&B's pitiful occupancy rate, the owners plan a huge refurbishment – but refuse to take on Alex's suggestions.
36	4	"The Rose and Crown"	27 July 2009	2.108
Alex visits the market town of Wisbech, where the 300-year-old Rose and Crown is in crisis. Alex aims to eliminate the mountains of paperwork strangling their business by giving Jonathan and Jacquie a master class in how a well-run hotel is managed.
37	5	"The Swan"	3 August 2009	2.312
Alex visits the 14th-century Swan Hotel in Norfolk. With 15 empty bedrooms and a deserted restaurant, the Swan is struggling to stay afloat. Her first impressions of the rest of the Swan are distinctly underwhelming. Inside she finds an unmanned reception, no guest lounge, threadbare carpets and urine stains on the bathroom floors. At breakfast in the pub-style restaurant, Alex quickly discovers the reason few customers are willing to eat there – with 30 dishes on the menu there is no way the food can be fresh.
38	6	"The African Queen"	10 August 2009	2.260
Alex climbs aboard floating hotel the African Queen. With the boat running at just 30 per cent occupancy, owners Bonny and Andy are at breaking point. The eight-bedroom floating hotel is failing to turn a profit – and even when the couple have guests, the heavy workload of running the boat is taking its toll.
39	7	"Glangrwyney Court"	17 August 2009	2.123
Alex Polizzi checks into Glangrwyney Court in the Black Mountains. Despite a five-star rating and a reasonable occupancy rate, the guesthouse is bleeding cash at an alarming rate. The hotel inspector is taken aback by the low prices Christina is charging for the rooms, Alex checks into the bridal suite, but is not impressed by the plastic doll in a cot – nor by the vast amount of clutter in the bedroom and bathroom. But the clutter is not the only problem – Alex is also astonished by the number of erotic paintings and ornaments Christina has on display.
40	8	"Hotel du Repos"	24 August 2009	2.574
Alex Polizzi checks into Liz and Michael's guesthouse in the Swiss Alps. The British couple emigrated a year ago – but their hopes of a restful retirement have been destroyed by an avalanche of work. When Alex arrives, a look at one of the bedrooms leaves her feeling positive. However, her experience at dinner is not so encouraging, Alex is not impressed by the unprofessional appearance of the staff, nor by the largely unused formal dining room.

=== Series 6 (2010) ===
Alex Polizzi returned as the show's host in this series.

No. overall	No. in series	Establishment	Original release date	UK viewers (millions)
41	1	"The Astor Hotel"	22 July 2010	2.033
Alex Polizzi strives to transform the fortunes of struggling guesthouses across Britain. In the opening instalment, she visits the Astor Hotel in Plymouth, but finds herself in conflict with the establishment's headstrong owner.
42	2	"Artist Residence B&B"	29 July 2010	1.733
Alex's latest challenge is the Artist Residence in Brighton, a nine-bedroom B&B run by 21-year-old student Justin. Decorated and staffed by up-andcoming artists, the establishment is designed to be a unique cross between art gallery and hotel, but it is currently failing miserably on both fronts.
43	3	"Rutland Arms Hotel"	5 August 2010	2.067
Alex turns her attention to the Rutland Arms Hotel in Bakewell, Derbyshire. Set on the edge of the Peak District, the hotel enjoys high occupancy rates during the summer months, but poor organisation, bad reviews and an absence of visitors in the winter have pushed 68-year-old owner David to the brink of financial ruin.
44	4	"Sandygate Hotel"	12 August 2010	2.327
Alex visit the Sandygate Hotel in South Yorkshire. Despite showing promise, a lack of marketing savvy and sloppy pricing have left the hotel in peril. When Alex arrives at the hotel, her first impression is not encouraging, she is met by an empty noticeboard, poor signage, shabby hanging baskets, and a reception confusingly located behind the bar. However, the rooms Alex inspects turn out to be of a fairly high quality. She soon realises why nobody is using the hotel – she can find no website information, reviews or pictures of it. In fact, it seems to have no online presence whatsoever.
45	5	"Windsors Hotel B&B"	19 August 2010	2.169
Alex heads to the Windsors Hotel, a hostelry in Chertsey plagued by poor decor, dated furnishings and an unenthusiastic owner.
46	6	"The Kingston Estate B&B"	26 August 2010	2.370
Alex visits a couple who own a historical house hotel in rural Devon. Although the building and country setting are beautiful, poor marketing and cluttered decor have brought the hostelry to the brink of collapse.

=== Series 7 (2011) ===
Series 7 started on 18 April 2011 on Channel 5. This was believed to be Polizzi's final series, according to a tweet she made on her official Twitter page, thus putting the future of the show in jeopardy. However, it was revealed in September 2011, that The Hotel Inspector would return on 3 October 2011.

The same graphics had been used as in previous series but a reworked new theme tune was adopted. This was the first time in the show history that the theme tune was altered. The show also had a competition advertised during the show breaks. Prizes included trips to the Maldives, a Holiday in a castle in Ireland & a luxury break in Mauritius.

In the table below the viewing figures have been supplied via BARB.

No. overall	No. in series	Establishment	Original release date	UK viewers (millions)
47	1	"First In Last Out inn + B&B"	18 April 2011	1.803
Alex Polizzi starts the series with the First In Last Out, a 17th-century B&B with a pub in Winchester, following a number of negative reviews. She refuses to sleep there after a run-in with a shower room, tries to help owner Jon Sweeney realise how budget accommodation should not mean low quality, and demonstrates the importance of cleaning.
48	2	"Hill House B&B"	25 April 2011	1.635
Alex Polizzi continues her quest to rectify the nation's reputation for poorly run establishments. In this edition, she helps a couple turn around the fortunes of their B&B in Ross-on-Wye, which has been subjected to numerous DIY experiments.
49	3	"Welcome Traveller inn + B&B"	2 May 2011	1.496
Alex Polizzi comes to the rescue of the Welcome Traveller Inn, located in west Wales. Despite its excellent location, this family-run business is struggling. Can any of Alex's bright ideas turn the hotel's fortunes around? The family's future is completely tied up in this business and Babs, who pays the bills, thinks she has six, maybe 12 months left to turn things around. If the business fails, Babs and her clan will lose both the business and the family home.
50	4	"Brendan Chase B&B"	9 May 2011	1.984
Alex Polizzi visits the Lake District to help 63-year-old David Maloney, a very well respected individual, with his dated B&B. The 11-bedroom Brendan Chase has a strict set of rules and has largely bypassed the internet age, making it unpopular with some guests. Alex tries to break through the owner's defences to improve his chances of making more profit.
51	5	"Merlin Court Hotel + B&B"	16 May 2011	1.818
Alex Polizzi tries to reverse the fortunes of the family-owned Merlin Court Hotel in Ilfracombe, Devon. The themed establishment's future is under threat from rising debts and dwindling occupancy rates, and one of Alex's priorities is to get the Shears, who run the business, working together.
52	6	"The Hollybush Inn + B&B"	23 May 2011	1.997
57-year-old healer Barbara Lewthwaite dreams of creating a laid-back, ethical, nature-friendly holiday retreat at the 18th-century Hollybush Inn in Hay-on-Wye. Her estate boasts tepees, a camping and caravan site, a five-bedroom B&B, and a bar and restaurant. Unhappy guests have complained about both the facilities and the barefooted owner. The dire reviews, coupled with poor winter trade, have left Barbara burdened with debt and fighting a constant battle for survival.
53	7	"The Grosvenor Hotel + inn"	30 May 2011	1.609
Alex Polizzi tries to turn around the fortunes of the Grosvenor Hotel in Rugby, Warwickshire, which has suffered from a downturn in bookings despite £600 being invested in its renovation. Owner Raman Bal hoped the business would be the foundation of an empire, but he has instead encountered debt and a struggle for survival.
54	8	"The White Horse inn + B&B"	6 June 2011	1.625
Alex Polizzi has been called into a picturesque inn in Suffolk, by owners Ann and her husband Paul. The couple have sunk their life savings into the building, but they have not made a profit in years. The inn has eight ensuite bedrooms, a restaurant, bar, cocktail bar, large beer garden... and reputedly several ghosts. Ann and Paul love the business but feel it runs them rather than the other way round, and they have run out of ideas about how to move forward. Alex must get them back on track before it is too late. She has plenty of ideas to help them, but when the hotel manager threatens to quit, she is left banging her head against the antique walls.

=== Series 8 (2011) ===
Series 8 started on 3 October 2011 on Channel 5. Alex Polizzi returned with the new series. The same graphics and theme tune adopted for series 7 remained for this series. The viewer competition remained with holidays for spa breaks in the New Forest being just one of the competition prizes.

The opening episode opened with just over 1 million viewers, lower than the opening episode of the previous series.

In the table below the viewing figures have been supplied via BARB.

No. overall	No. in series	Establishment	Original release date	UK viewers (millions)
55	1	"Milton Lodge House Hotel + B&B"	3 October 2011	1.290
Alex Polizzi visits a hotel located in six acres of Dorset countryside, complete with stables, an outdoor pool and a cricket pitch. The owners of the lodge have seen a steady decline in bookings since they put an end to letting it for profitable functions, causing concern that the house may not be able to support them in the future. Alex believes, however, their long-serving assistant could help guide the venue to prosperity.
56	2	"Bonnington Beach Hotel + inn + B&B"	10 October 2011	1.270
Alex Polizzi helps a couple in Bournemouth whose hotel near the beach is struggling to break even. Despite frequently reaching full capacity – with 57 beds in 21 rooms – the pair cannot seem to turn a profit, so the expert hotelier advises them to strip back their facilities and begin charging for extra amenities. She also suggests they build on the success of their Army-style boot camp by offering other self-improvement courses to their guests.
57	3	"Madonna Halley Hotel + inn + B&B"	17 October 2011	1.659
Alex Polizzi turns her well-shod toes towards Edgware in north London and the Madonna Halley hotel. She arrives to find a chic, charming, extremely efficient little business that's raking in enviable profits, so she goes home for a cup of tea. Of course not! The hotel is shoddy and badly finished. Its owners, the cheery Florides family, are well-meaning but the place is losing money at an alarming rate. Alex takes a quick inventory of its myriad failings, including a truly stomach-turningly horrible carpet in her ensuite bathroom, before cracking the whip at the Florides and bringing in her own design team to spruce the place up.
58	4	"The Crown Inn Hotel + B&B"	24 October 2011	1.420
Alex Polizzi heads for Derbyshire's Peak District to help the owner of a 15th-century inn deal with a stream of problems. The two-star venue has 10 en-suite bedrooms, a bar and a 50-seat restaurant, but struggles to attract customers at the weekends. With a wage bill of £10 a month, the business is estimated to have made a loss of £600 over the years, and the expert hotelier sets out to improve the dated decor and turn around the hotel's fortunes.
59	5	"Grimscote Manor Hotel + B&B"	31 October 2011	1.310
Jill and Steve own and run a smart 14-bedroom, two-star manor hotel on the outskirts of Birmingham. It boasts a restaurant, swimming pool, gardens, and a marquee fully equipped for the hotel's wedding service. Jill loves to play bridal fairy godmother, but life at the hotel is far from a fairytale. The couple has invested time and savings in the manor, but the bottom line doesn't match their input. The business has never made a profit; they are losing £700-£1 a week; and now their relationship, as well as the hotel, is floundering.
60	6	"Who'd A Thought It Guest House + inn"	7 November 2011	1.642
In Kent, self-styled showman Joe has been popping champagne corks in the family-owned, eight-bedroom 'champagne and oyster bar with rooms' for the past 23 years. After leaving his London casino job to manage the business, Joe's aim has been to bring a taste of the four-star city luxury to the quiet Kent countryside. But his 'unique' tastes in décor haven't been to everyone's liking. Alex has her hands full, trying to convince Joe to embrace some changes to make his hotel a little more 'female friendly'. But when she is asked to spend the night in the 'Champagne and Shoes' room with mirrored ceilings and a dance pole, it is clear that Joe's naked ambition may have gone one step too far.
61	7	"The New Lyngarth Hotel + inn + B&B"	14 November 2011	1.518
The owner of The New Lyngarth, Blackpool, took over the derelict 15-bedroom building in 2009 and has grand plans for his seaside hotel, hoping to pull in an upmarket, select clientele more in keeping with a private members' club. When water drips onto Alex's head during breakfast, the full extent of the problems begin to unfold and, after her attempts to inject some new life into the hostelry are met with scepticism, she wonders if the hotel will ever make the grade. Alex hopes to turn things around by bringing the hotel up to scratch and getting the establishment an accreditation from the tourist board, Visit England.
62	8	"Bodkin House B&B"	21 November 2011	N/A
In Badminton, Gloucestershire, Dom and his wife Eileen ask Alex for help with their former coaching inn

=== Series 9 (2012) ===
No. overall	No. in series	Establishment	Original release date	UK viewers (millions)
63	1	"The Clover Hotel + B&B"	5 July 2012	1.915
Alex Polizzi comes to the rescue of more struggling hotels, beginning with Birmingham naturist retreat the Clover, whose owner Tim Higgs insists Alex has to strip off before she can start work. She soon discovers this strict no-clothes rule, while not surprising for a naturist hotel, applies at all times throughout the entire establishment - even in the lounge and restaurant – a policy she believes will put off more customers than it attracts. But despite rising debts, Tim refuses to budge on his naturist principles.
64	2	"The Oakland Hotel + inn + B&B"	12 July 2012	1.897
Alex visits a hotel and nightclub in Essex, run by a family who are simply not dancing to the same beat.
65	3	"The Caspian Hotel + B&B"	19 July 2012	1.697
Alex travels to a hotel in Ealing, owned and run by former beautician Nousha and her son.
66	4	"The Bellingham Hotel + B&B + Restaurant"	26 July 2012	1.864
Alex is asked to inject some Northern Soul into a struggling hotel in Wigan and restore it to its former glory.
67	5	"Mansion Lions Hotel"	2 August 2012	1.589
Alex walks into the lion's den when she helps a struggling establishment in Eastbourne.
68	6	"Meudon Country House Hotel + Restaurant"	9 August 2012	1.685
Alex travels to Falmouth to help father-and-son team Harry and Mark with their 29 bedroom country house hotel that has been struggling with low occupancy and low profits.
69	7	"The White Hart Hotel + inn"	16 August 2012	1.767
Alex visits a 15th-century haunted hotel in St Albans, where guests often get more than they bargain for.
70	8	"Godolphin "Arms" Hotel + B&B"	23 August 2012	2.122
In Newquay, Alex tries to persuade 71-year-old hotelier Margaret to change her ways.
71	9	"Walpole Bay Hotel + B&B (Revisited)"	30 August 2012	1.969
Alex revisits a hotelier she advised in Margate, but is not met with a warm welcome.
72	10	"African Queen Boat Hotel + B&B (Revisited)"	6 September 2012	1.579
Alex returns to the eight bedroom floating hotel on the River Thames, to check whether the business is still afloat.

=== The Hotel Inspector Returns (2013) ===
This series consists of four episodes returning to previous locations was announced in June 2013 and started airing 18 July 2013 on channel 5.

No. overall	No. in series	Establishment	Original release date	UK viewers (millions)
73	1	"The Artist Residence"	18 July 2013	1.340
Alex revisits Brighton to see how The Artist Residence is getting on since her visit in series 6.
74	2	"First in Last Out"	25 July 2013	1.671
Alex revisits Winchester to see how First in Last Out is getting on since her visit in series 7.
75	3	"Who'd a Thought It"	1 August 2013	1.210
Alex revisits Kent to see how Who'd a Thought It is getting on since her visit in series 8.
76	4	"The Caspian"	8 August 2013	1.530
Alex revisits Kent to see how The Caspian is getting on since her visit in series 9.

=== Series 10 (2014) ===
No. overall	No. in series	Establishment	Original release date	UK viewers (millions)
77	1	"Epstein House Hotel, Bar & B&B"	6 February 2014	1.279
Alex Polizzi visits a hotel in Liverpool that used to be Beatles manager Brian Epstein's house, where the owner of the hotel has memorabilia of The Beatles all around the hotel.
78	2	"The Vidella Hotel, Bar & Restaurant"	13 February 2014	1.174
Alex Polizzi visits the Blackpool hotel where she meets owners Neil and John who were best friends when they took over the hotel over a decade ago. They both love a joke and guests were greeted by bangers in the wardrobes, fake insects in the breakfasts and a pound coin stuck to the floor in reception.
79	3	"Eden Lodge B&B"	20 February 2014	1.751
Alex visits an ancient bed and breakfast in the seaside town of Falmouth in Cornwall that is in danger of going under.
80	4	"Alexandra Hotel, Cafe' Bar, & Restaurant"	27 February 2014	1.441
Church minister John Humberstone has been welcoming guests to the Grade-II listed building Alexandra Hotel in Llandudno Conwy County Borough for the past couple of years, but the business is in deep trouble
81	5	"Paramount Hotel & Restaurant"	6 March 2014	1.366
The owners of Paramount Hotel in Nottingham push Alex Polizzi to the edge and she comes close to walking out for the first time ever.
82	6	"The Gungate Hotel, Bar & B&B"	13 March 2014	1.578
Sue Tipton bought the Gungate Hotel in Tamworth, on impulse because she was looking for a challenge, but the last few years have become a constant struggle and she has been forced to run the business virtually single-handed.
83	7	"The Green Man Bar & Hotel"	20 March 2014	1.600
The Green Man Pub and Hotel is in Wembley near Wembley Stadium, but bad reviews and old-fashioned bedrooms are putting off guests and forcing owner Mel Preedy to rely on the establishment's pub to support the hotel side of the business. This Episode is the second time in the history of the show that Alex refused to stay the night.
84	8	"Waterhall Country Hotel, Restaurant & B&B"	27 March 2014	1.481
Alex Polizzi heads to Crawley in West Sussex to try to help out a family-run concern just five miles away from Gatwick Airport. Despite its proximity to the busy airport, the Waterhall Country Hotel is struggling and owners Anne and Andy Marsh desperately need a change in fortunes if it is to become profitable

=== The Hotel Inspector Returns (2014) ===
A series consisting of four episodes returning to previous locations commenced on 26 June 2014. Viewing figures are from BARB and include Channel 5+1.

No. overall	No. in series	Establishment	Original release date	UK viewers (millions)
85	1	"The Meudon"	25 June 2014	1.522
Alex revisits Falmouth to see how The Meudon is getting on since her visit in series 9.
86	2	"The Oakland Hotel"	2 July 2014	1.370
Alex revisits Essex to see how The Oakland Hotel is getting on since her visit in series 9.
87	3	"Godoplhin Arms Hotel"	9 July 2014	1.263
Alex revisits Newquay to see how Godoplhin Arms Hotel is getting on since her visit in series 9.
88	4	"The White Hart"	16 July 2014	1.530
Alex revisits St Albans to see how The White Hart is getting on since her visit in series 9.

=== Series 11 (2015) ===
The viewing figures in the table below are supplied via BARB, they include Channel 5+1.

No. overall	No. in series	Establishment	Original release date	UK viewers (millions)
89	1	"The Fieldhead Hotel, B&B & Restaurant"	9 April 2015	1.451
Alex travels to Looe to try and transform the Fieldhead, a 16-bedroom hotel where the staff are struggling with the complex booking system.
90	2	"Harmony B&B & Hotel"	16 April 2015	1.365
Alex travels to Torquay, Devon to try and transform a music-themed bed and breakfast.
91	3	"Albion House Hotel, Restaurant & B&B"	23 April 2015	1.216
Alex travels to Ramsgate to try and transform and revive what once was a summer retreat for Queen Victoria.
92	4	"Hotel Celebrity Bar, Restaurant & B&B"	30 April 2015	1.247
Alex travels to Bournemouth to try and transform Hotel Celebrity, a 55-bedroom hotel where each of the rooms have been named after movie stars and famous musicians.
93	5	"Mountain View / renamed to Mountain View Self Catering, B&B"	7 May 2015	N/A
Alex travels to Port Talbot, Wales to try and transform Mountain View.
94	6	"The Grant Arms Hotel, Bar & B&B"	14 May 2015	N/A
Alex travels to Ramsbottom, Greater Manchester to try and transform The Grant Arms Hotel, a 14-bedroom 19th-century listed building.
95	7	"The Little Thatch Inn & Restaurant"	21 May 2015	N/A
Alex travels to Gloucester to try and transform The Little Thatch Inn, a 14th-century hotel.
96	8	"La Casa Hotel"	28 May 2015	N/A
Alex travels to Torrox in southern Spain to try and transform the La Casa Hotel.

=== The Hotel Inspector Returns (2015) ===
A series consisting of four episodes returning to previous locations commenced on 1 September 2015. Viewing figures are from BARB and include Channel 5+1.

No. overall	No. in series	Establishment	Original release date
97	1	"The Paramount Hotel"	1 September 2015
Alex revisits Nottingham to see how The Paramount Hotel is getting on since her visit in series 10.
98	2	"Glangrwyney Court"	8 September 2015
Alex revisits South Wales to see how Glangrywney Court is getting on since her visit in series 5.
99	3	"Eden Lodge"	15 September 2015
Alex revisits Falmouth to see how Eden Lodge is getting on since her visit in series 10.
100	4	"The Caspian"	22 September 2015
Alex revisits Ealing to see how The Caspian is getting on since her visits in series 10 and "Returns" 2013.

=== Series 12 (2016) ===
The twelfth series of The Hotel Inspector started airing 8 June 2016 on Channel 5. The viewing figures in the table below are the Channel 5 total weekly viewers supplied via BARB.

No. overall	No. in series	Establishment	Original release date	UK viewers (millions)
101	2	"Harrogate Motel / Harrogate Country B&B & Bar"	8 June 2016	1.79
Alex visits the Harrogate Motel in Harrogate, North Yorkshire, where the owners are deliberately not telling their guests that the establishment is situated in the middle of a muddy equine centre.
102	3	"Hotel Continental"	15 June 2016	1.63
Alex visits The Hotel Continental in Harwich, Essex, a quirky 14-bedroom hotel that overlooks the beach and boasts unique, individually designed rooms.
103	4	"The Black Bear Hotel, Bar & Restaurant"	22 June 2016	1.83
Alex Polizzi visits The Black Bear Hotel, a coaching inn in Wareham, Dorset, run by first-time hotelier Lynda Maytum and her family.
104	5	"The Gyreum, Lodge"	29 June 2016	1.84
Alex Polizzi visits The Gyreum, an eco-lodge in County Sligo, ireland, which is run by Colum Stapleton and his daughter Finn.
105	6	"The Richmoor Hotel, Bar & Restaurant"	6 July 2016	1.62
Alex Polizzi visits The Richmoor Hotel in Weymouth, Dorset where mother and manager Loraine employs several of her seven children.
106	7	"Atlantic House, Bude"	13 July 2016	1.59
In the seaside resort of Bude in Cornwall, Alex Polizzi tries to help a shy and retiring hotelier who has a reputation for hiding away from his guests.
107	8	"The Bulstone Hotel"	20 July 2016	1.49
Husband and wife Judith and Kevin have run their hotel for 20 years, but their once busy establishment has fallen out of favour with Britain's family staycation set in Branscombe, East Devon

=== The Hotel Inspector Returns (2016) ===
A series consisting of three episodes returning to previous locations commenced on 30 August 2016. Viewing figures are from BARB and include Channel 5+1.

No. overall	No. in series	Establishment	Original release date
109	1	"The Fieldhead"	30 August 2016
Alex revisits Looe to see how The Fieldhead is getting on since her visit in series 11.
110	2	"Albion House"	6 September 2016
Alex revisits Ramsgate to see how Albion House is getting on since her visit in series 11.
111	3	"Hotel Celebrity"	13 September 2016
Alex revisits Bournemouth to see how Hotel Celebrity is getting on since her visit in series 11.

=== Series 13 (2017) ===
Viewing figures are from BARB and include Channel 5+1.

No. overall	No. in series	Establishment	Original release date	UK viewers (millions)
112	1	"The Regency Rooms / Peaky Blinders BeerMongers Bar & Hotel"	27 June 2017	1.69
Alex Polizzi helps a couple with their beachfront business in the Merseyside resort of Southport. The pair have grand plans, but will The Hotel Inspector bring them down to earth with a bump? who are converting the rooms above their craft-beer bar into a hotel, as well as wanting to add a tapas bar and a chicken shop!
113	2	"The House"	4 July 2017	1.5
Alex steps in to try to convince a generous hotelier to pass on the price of luxury to her customers. Near the historic city of Bath, Somerset, business partners Rowena and Mike are running a boutique hotel that is on the brink of going under.
114	3	"Colliter's Brook Farm"	11 July 2017	1.35
The Hotel Inspector heads to Colliters Brook Farm near Bristol, to try to make sense of owner Richard's struggling business which was derailed after a planning application was turned down.
115	4	"Churston Court"	18 July 2017	1.62
Chris and Jonathan bought this crumbling historic building with their hearts rather than their heads, and are now starting to realise the mammoth task before them. Can Alex reverse decades of ugly decor, teach her hosts to clear the clutter, erase the oppressive red and herald a more glamorous, curated look?
116	5	"Forest Park"	25 July 2017	1.41
After saying goodbye to numerous managers, Sean has decided to run his hotel himself, but a string of bad reviews has left him floundering. Can Alex convince him to take his builder's hat off and start running the place like a business?

=== Hotel Inspector: Checking in, Checking Out (2017) ===
A series consisting of four episodes returning to previous locations commenced on 8 September 2017. Noticeably within the episodes produced, normal 'The Hotel Inspector Returns' title cards were used, not the 'Checking In, Checking Out' title as used in programme listings. Viewing figures are from BARB and include Channel 5+1. There was a small hiatus within the series, with the last two episodes being shown at 3am and 4am on 17 December respectively.

No. overall	No. in series	Establishment	Original release date
117	6	"The Blue Inn"	8 September 2017
Alex returns to Redditch where, 18 months before, Donna was struggling to channel her energy away from the front line and into transforming her hotel's concept.
118	7	"Atlantic House Hotel"	15 September 2017
Alex Polizzi returns to Bude in Cornwall to see if Trevor, the previously shy owner of the Atlantic House Hotel, has taken her advice to step out of the shadows, and to see whether the tide of customers has started flowing in the right direction.
119	8	"Harrogate Country B&B"	17 December 2017
Alex Polizzi returns to discover how life at the Harrogate Country B&B has been going since her last visit. She is keen to see if the changes that were made have helped turn around its fortunes and she also has another idea to boost income.
120	9	"Waterhall Country Hotel"	17 December 2017
Hotel inspector Alex Polizzi checks into hotels and guest houses that she has previously visited to check how their fortunes have fared. She heads back to the Waterhall Country Hotel near Gatwick airport. Will the hotel finally be flying high?

=== Series 14 (2018) ===
No. overall	No. in series	Establishment	Original release date
121	1	"The Crown Inn, Aldbourne"	5 June 2018
Alex Polizzi drops in to help 69-year-old Alan, who hoped that the Crown would set him up for retirement, but has left him working all hours for no profit. Shocked by what she finds, Alex refuses to check herself in.
122	2	"Yeoldon House Hotel, Bideford"	12 June 2018
Retired couple John and Ilona spent thousands on this ten-bed hotel, but occupancy is below 10%. Alex has a plan.
123	3	"Horse & Hound Country Inn; / Tenison Towers Guest House"	19 June 2018
For the first time, Alex tackles two hotels at once.
124	4	"Westward Ho! Hotel, Folkestone"	26 June 2018
Alex must mediate a fall-out to get everyone back onboard.
125	5	"Warwick Hall"	3 July 2018
Retirees Val and Nick need to rebrand and rejuvenate.
126	6	"The Grove Arms, Ludwell"	10 July 2018
Alex Polizzi guides a pub that has gone off the rails.
127	7	"The Sheldon, Eastbourne"	17 July 2018
Alex rebrands a featureless hotel as a family B&B.

=== Series 15 (2019) ===
No. overall	No. in series	Establishment	Original release date	UK viewers (millions)
128	1	"Rosehill House Hotel"	6 June 2019	1.18
129	2	"The Sea Croft"	13 June 2019	1.19
130	3	"The Lawn Guest House, Horley"	20 June 2019	1.29
131	4	"Gipsy Hill Hotel, Exeter"	27 June 2019	1.18
132	5	"Zero Neuf, Gaudies"	4 July 2019	1.32
133	6	"Devon Bay Hotel, Ilfracombe"	11 July 2019	1.32
134	7	"The George Hotel, Henfield"	18 July 2019	1.56
135	8	"The Crown Inn, Wiltshire (Revisit)"	10 December 2019	N/A
Series had a 5 month hiatus but returned on 5 Select to show this final episode. Alex Polizzi returns to the Wiltshire village of Aldbourne to see if the 70-year-old landlord of the Crown Inn has cleaned up his act.

=== Series 16 (2021) ===
No. overall	No. in series	Establishment	Original release date
136	1	"Coach & Horses"	10 June 2021
In Dorset, Alex Polizzi helps James and Yvonne, the owners of the Coach and Horses. They are struggling to attract business, despite it being the only pub in the village. Alex is instantly shocked at the first impression of the Coach, its rooms and also its owners, but can she get their business back on track?
137	2	"The Dukes"	17 June 2021
Alex Polizzi heads to the Dukes in the Bedfordshire village of Heath and Reach to help mum-of-two Sarah to improve the pub she bought three years ago. After a successful first year, a personal setback turned Sarah's dream into a nightmare. With a knock to her confidence and her eye off the ball, occupancy took a nosedive and the business has bombed. Alex arrives to find Sarah hiding from customers in the kitchen, staff kicking their heels and the place looking more like a youth club than a character country pub.
138	3	"Grenfell Arms"	24 June 2021
Berkshire beckons as Alex Polizzi is called to the Grenfell Arms in Maidenhead, a pub with eight bedrooms and a restaurant, all run by 31-year-old Jamie. He cannot find staff, so he is doing all the jobs with the help of his mum, Sandy. She brings a lot of experience and advice to the table, but the two have trouble working harmoniously together, which isn't helping Jamie's business succeed.
139	4	"Northshore, Bude"	1 July 2021
Alex Polizzi visits Cornwall to tackle saving a hostel that was bought by two travellers.
140	5	"Michelangelo's"	8 July 2021
Alex Polizzi is enlisted to rescue Michelangelo's, a hotel and restaurant owned by Paolo Pieri and operated with the help of his brother, Giacomo in the North East of England.
141	6	"Spanhoe"	22 July 2021
Alex finds her way to Spanhoe Lodge in Northamptonshire, where an unexplained crash in guests has forced them to turn to The Hotel Inspector for help.
142	7	"Warwick Hall (Revisit)"	29 July 2021
Alex returns to one of her grandest hotels yet, Warwick Hall. In the 10 bedroom Cumbrian country house, the lifestyle may have been idyllic, but business was dire.
143	8	"West Usk (Revisit)"	5 August 2021
Alex tackles a small bed and breakfast in a lighthouse near the Bristol Channel. Can Alex convince the reluctant owners to heed her advice?

=== Series 17 (2022) ===
No. overall	No. in series	Establishment	Original release date
144	1	"LG Thai Derm Spa and Guest House"	16 June 2022
Alex Polizzi is at the LG Thai Derm Spa and Guest House, run by first-time hoteliers.
145	2	"Gracellie Hotel"	23 June 2022
Alex Polizzi heads to the famous seaside town of Shanklin on the Isle of Wight.
146	3	"Caer Beris Manor"	30 June 2022
The Inspector visits Caer Beris Manor, run by former real estate agent Omar and his wife.
147	4	"The Pack O' Cards"	7 July 2022
This time, Alex visits The Pack O' Cards, an Inn with rooms in Combe Martin on the north Devon Coast.
148	5	"The Lamp Post Villa B&B"	14 July 2022
Alex meets fellow Italian and first-time hotelier Carmine, who runs The Lamp Post Villa B&B in the centre of the historic spa city of Bath.
149	6	"The Falcon Hotel"	28 July 2022
Alex Polizzi visits The Falcon Hotel in Cambridgeshire. Run by hotelier Colin and his daughter Jean, the duo took on the lease of this sixteenth century coaching inn 11 years ago.
150	7	"Michelangelo's (Revisit)"	4 August 2022
Alex returns to Michelangelo's near Newcastle, a 10-bedroom hotel, bar and Italian restaurant set in four acres.
151	8	"The Rosehill House (Revisit)"	11 August 2022
The Hotel Inspector returns to Rosehill House, a 30-bedroom hotel in Burnley. When Alex first arrived two and a half years ago, she met a dad with a deadline and a daughter in despair.

=== Series 18 (2023) ===
No. overall	No. in series	Establishment	Original release date
152	1	"Believe Bar and Bedrooms"	10 October 2023
153	2	"The Kings Arms"	17 October 2023
154	3	"Stump Cross Caverns"	24 October 2023
155	4	"York Hotel"	31 October 2023

=== Series 19 (2024) ===
No. overall	No. in series	Establishment	Original release date
156	1	"Riders Rest"	28 March 2024
157	2	"Sea Air Bed & Breakfast"	4 April 2024
158	3	"Chiltern's View Lodges"	18 April 2024
159	4	"The Royal George"	25 April 2024
160	5	"East Sussex Shepherds Huts"	2 May 2024
161	6	"Billy Andy's"	9 May 2024
162	7	"Lantern Theatre and Cafe"	16 May 2024
163	8	"Frazer's"	23 May 2024
164	9	"Westward Ho! Revisit"	30 May 2024
165	10	"Hotel Celebrity Revisit"	6 June 2024
166	11	"Loughborough Grange Revisit"	13 June 2024
167	12	"The Dukes Revisit"	27 June 2024

=== Series 20 (2025) ===
No. overall	No. in series	Establishment	Original release date
168	1	"The Ramblers' Rest"	17 July 2025
169	2	"Westbrook Lodge"	24 July 2025
170	3	"St Mary's Gate Inn"	31 July 2025
171	4	"By the Red Phone Box"	7 August 2025
172	5	"St Ann's House"	14 August 2025
173	6	"Metro Cafe"	28 August 2025
174	7	"The Farmers Boy Inn"	4 September 2025
175	8	"Old Hall House"	11 September 2025

=== Series 21 (2026) ===
The Twenty-first series of The Hotel Inspector began airing on 26 February 2026 at 9.00pm on Channel 5.

No. overall	No. in series	Establishment	Original release date
176	1	"Appalachian Spring"	26 February 2026
177	2	"The Navigator"	5 March 2026
178	3	"The Swan"	12 March 2026
179	4	"Gatwick Turrent"	19 March 2026
180	5	"The Castle Inn"	26 March 2026
181	6	"Plume of Feathers"	23 April 2026
182	7	"Platform Tavern"	30 April 2026
183	8	"Breaks Fold Farm"	21 May 2026
