= Ruth Watson's Hotel Rescue =

- Starring: Ruth Watson
- Country of origin: United Kingdom
- Original language: English
- No. of episodes: 6

Production
- Running time: 46 Minutes

Original release
- Network: Channel 4
- Release: 30 September – 4 November 2009

Ruth Watson's Hotel Rescue is an observational documentary television series which aired on British terrestrial television channel, Channel 4 in 2009.

In each episode, the celebrated hotelier Ruth Watson visits and assesses the site of a planned hotel, guest house or bed and breakfast, and offers advice and support to the new owner/s. Watson identifies weaknesses in the preparations of the new establishments, and then sends the new owners to various hotels in the UK to improve their skills. Each episode usually culminates in the new hotel being secretly inspected and assessed by a tourism agency or travel writer.

Premiering in September 2009, Hotel Rescue was the second Channel 4 series to star Ruth Watson, as part of her exclusive deal with the channel to front a number of series. Watson also fronts Country House Rescue for Channel 4, which sees her turn her attention to struggling country houses and their owners. Watson has previously starred in The Hotel Inspector, a documentary series for Five of a very similar format to Ruth Watson's Hotel Rescue, but with existing struggling hotels, rather than new start-ups. Watson herself has described the show as "Grand Designs meets The Hotel Inspector".

Although calls to take part in the programme were placed at the end of each episode, in a statement on her personal website announcing a halt to her presenting career, Watson mentioned that Hotel Rescue was never recommissioned for any further series.

== Episode guide ==
=== Series One - 2009 ===
Series One premiered on Thursday 30 September 2009 on Channel 4.

- Creeting House, Creeting St Mary, Suffolk
- Stubton Hall, Stubton, Lincolnshire
- Kenbarry Hotel/The Blackpool, Blackpool, Lancashire
- Icon Hotel, Luton, Bedfordshire
- The Reading Rooms, Margate, Kent
- The Royal Hotel, Clacton-on-Sea, Essex
