= Pen-y-Lan Hall =

Country house near Ruabon, Wales

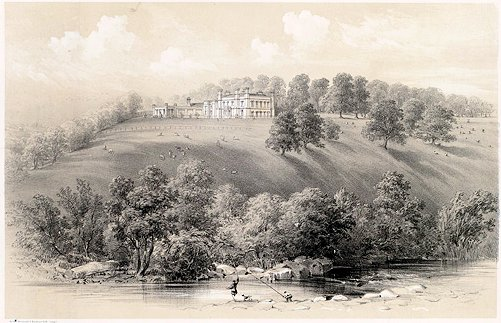
- 1840-1860
- Interactive map of the Pen-y-Lan Hall area

General information
- Architectural style: Regency gothic
- Location: Ruabon, Wrexham County Borough, Wales
- Coordinates: 52.962822°N 3.000351°W
- Inaugurated: 1690

Website
- http://www.pen-y-lan.co.uk

Pen-y-Lan Hall is a Grade II-listed Tudor-Gothic Revival country house located near the village of Ruabon in Wrexham County Borough, Wales. The building may have been built in the late seventeenth century, but was remodelled in the mid-nineteenth.

== History ==
The house is said to date from around 1690, but it was remodelled in 1830. It was purchased in 1854 by Thomas Hardcastle of the cotton manufacturing firm of Ormrod and Hardcastle. It was enlarged and altered later in the century, although most of these additions were demolished during the 1950s. The Ormrod family have owned Pen-y-Lan Hall since the nineteenth century, and to this day sits in a 1,000-acre (400 ha) estate. On the edge of the estate James Ormrod built All Saints church in 1889. The dark red sandstone was quarried from his land near the River Dee and the wood furnishings were made from oak felled on the estate. Ormrod, addressing guests at the opening of the church only two months before his death, said "My dear friends, I wish to thank you all for your presence here today and to remind you that the church I have been privileged to see opened is a memorial to my dear wife. I trust you will make good use of it, and that it will be a great spiritual benefit to you and your families."

The hall was Grade II listed on 22 February 1995. In 2011, Pen-y-Lan Hall was the subject of a Channel 4 television documentary presented by hotelier Ruth Watson as part of her Country House Rescue series. It is routinely visited by ghost hunting groups; on one visit in 2012 a recording over six hours of a visit included children's voices, music being played, and footsteps. Howard Hughes of the Spirit Quest UK group in Wrexham described the property as being one of the most haunted places in Britain.

The parks and gardens are listed as Grade II in the Cadw/ICOMOS Register of Parks and Gardens of Special Historic Interest in Wales.

== Description ==
Pen-y-Lan Hall is a two-storey, stuccoed and castellated Tudor-Gothic Revival-style building. The front of the house has an attic behind a parapet with symmetrical castellated chimney stacks at the ends of the building. The crenellated two-storey front porch projects from the facade and is two bays wide. The rear side of the hall is much the same as the front, albeit four bays wide with three castellated chimney stacks.
