= Hill Place =

- Location within Hampshire

General information
- Type: Country House
- Architectural style: Georgian
- Location: Swanmore, Hampshire, England
- Coordinates: 50.944584°N 1.165323°W
- Inaugurated: 1753

Website
- http://www.hillplace.co.uk

Hill Place is a grade II listed Georgian country villa located near the village of Swanmore in Hampshire, England.

Today, Hill Place is set within 20 acres (81,000 m^{2}) of well-tended parkland, beyond which is an apple farm and further afield the Meon Valley. It is hired out as a venue for weddings, private receptions and corporate events.

In 2011, Hill Place was the subject of a Channel 4 television documentary presented by hotelier Ruth Watson as part of her Country House Rescue series.

== Richard Goodlad ==
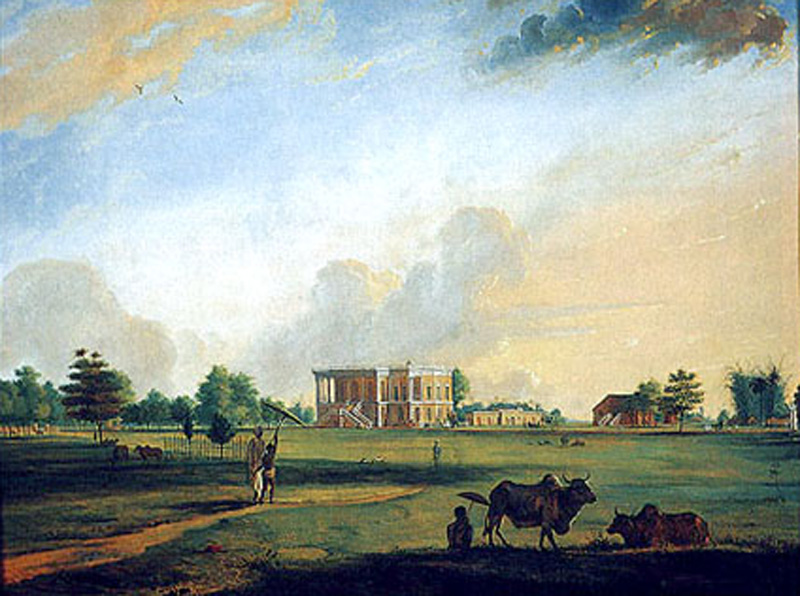
The residence of Richard Goodlad in India when he worked for the East India Company. The painting was made by the Flemish painter Frans Balthazar Solvyns in 1793

Richard Goodlad built Hill Place in about 1790. It is thought that Sir John Soane was the architect as the house is very similar to some of his well-known buildings and he did have connections to the Goodlad family.

Richard Goodlad was born in 1755 in London. His father was Richard Goodlad and his mother was Elizabeth Martin. At this time according to the baptismal records the family lived in Old Mile End Town in London. Richard had two elder brothers William Martin Goodlad (1746–1773) and Anthony Bennett Goodlad (1749–1783). Both of them worked for the East India Company and in 1771 when Richard was sixteen he joined his brothers in India. Some detail of the three brothers in India is given in the Manuscripts of Sir Robert Palk who was the Governor of Madras and a close friend of William Martin Goodlad. Richard worked as a merchant for the East India Company in Bengal from 1771 until 1801. In the later part of his career he lived in a large house in Baruipur in West Bengal. The artist François Balthazar Solvyns painted a picture of Richard’s house in 1793.

In 1784, Richard married Martha Redfearn in Bengal. Unfortunately, she died the following year in 1785 at the age of only 23. Richard erected a memorial to her and composed a verse in her honour. The memorial exists today and is shown online.

Richard retired from the East India Company in 1801 and lived at Hill Place. In 1803, he married Frances Leonora White and they had four children Frances Elizabeth Goodlad (later Daubeny) (1804–1878), Elizabeth Goodlad (1806–1890), Leonora Goodlad (1808–1895) and Richard Redfearn Goodlad (1809–1880).

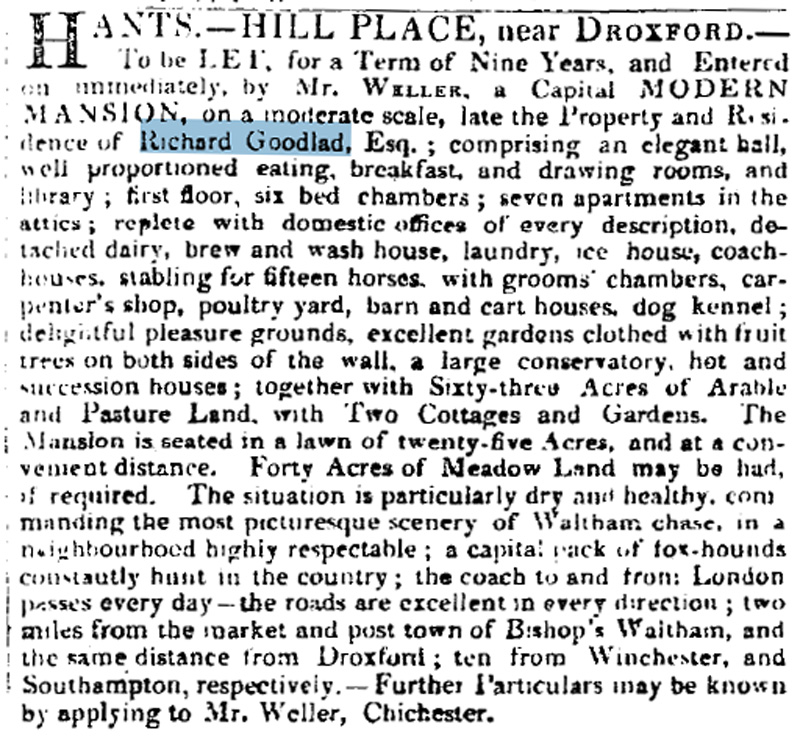
Advertisement for the rental of Hill Place in 1822.

== From 1821 ==
Richard died in 1821 and in the following year a notice was placed in a newspaper advertising the rental of the property (see photo at right). The house remained in the ownership of the Goodlad family until 1916 when it was sold.
