= Abbey Dore Court =

Country house in Abbey Dore, England

Coordinates: 51.972697°N 2.893398°W

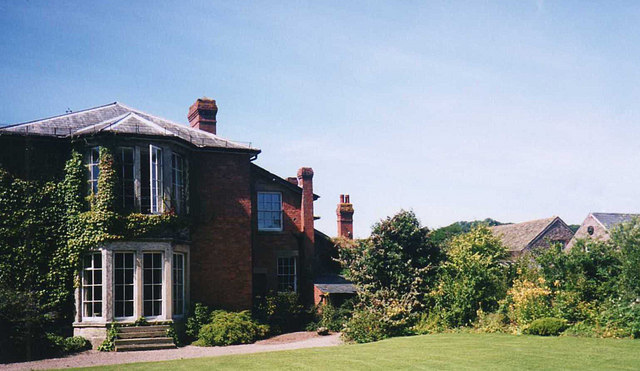
Abbey Dore Court.

Abbey Dore Court is a country house in Abbey Dore, Herefordshire, England.

It was built in the Golden Valley in 1861 for Thomas Freke Lewis. It includes the former public house, the Red Lion Inn which was built in the early 1800s. The property was owned by the Partridge family and then later by the Prothero family of Malpas Court. The house is now surrounded by a significant plantsman's garden created by the previous owner, Charis Ward, since 1976. These, and the Stables Tearooms, were open to the public but are no longer.

In 2010, the house underwent significant renovation and internal modernisation in order to be let for holiday rentals.

Dore Abbey, the 1147 Cistercian abbey, which is still used as the village place of worship, is nearby.

In April 2010 and September 2011, Abbey Dore Court was the subject of a Channel 4 television documentary presented by hotelier Ruth Watson as part of her Country House Rescue series.

The property was sold in 2018 and is now privately owned.

== Owners of Abbey Dore Court ==
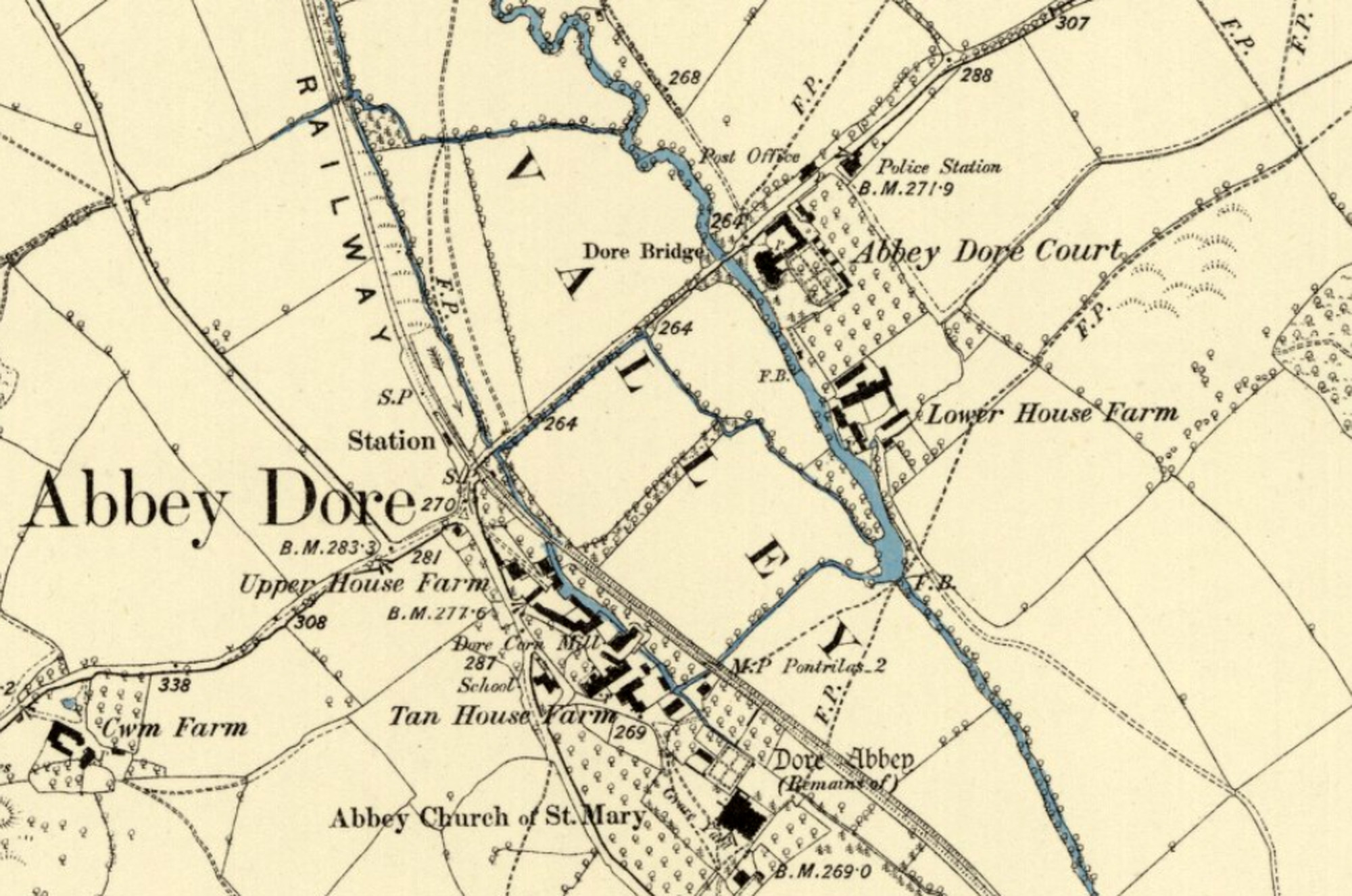
Map of Abbey Dore 1886.

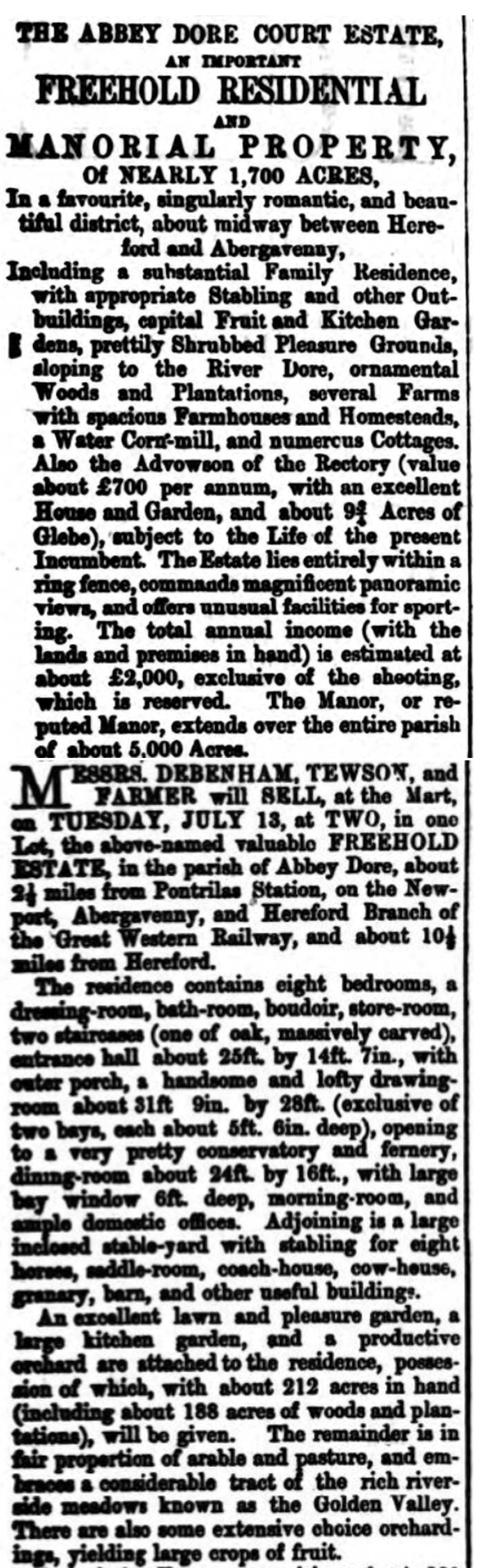
Ad for sale of Abbey Dore Court 1875

The Red Lion Inn which still forms part of Abbey Dore Court dates back to the early 1800s. In 1821 it was inherited by John Higford (1771-1852) as part of an estate in Abbey Dore consisting of 1434 acres. He had been born John Parsons but had changed his name to Higford at the time of his inheritance. In 1852 he died and in his will the property was left to his cousin Captain Thomas Freke Lewis.

Captain Thomas Freke Lewis (1831-1908) in about 1861 added a Victorian Wing as well as Italian mosaic floors, moulded ceilings, a ballroom, a Jacobean staircase and a 1621 fireplace, all of which survive today. He was born in 1831 in Wales. His father was the Reverend Francis Lewis. He joined the Royal Monmouth Militia and then in 1855 was promoted to Lieutenant in the 23rd Foot Royal Welch Fusiliers. He subsequently became a Captain.

In 1858 he married Jane Anne Harris (1838-1899) but the couple had no children. Thomas was regarded as a fine sportsman and at one time was Master of the Herefordshire Hounds. In 1875 he advertised the property for sale but subsequently decided not to sell it. The advertisement is shown.

His wife Jane died in 1899 and it was thought that he continued to be a widower. It was expected that as he had no children that his nephew Archer George Prothero would inherit his estates. However when he died in 1908 his Will revealed that he had a wife whom he had married in 1904 and two children. They inherited the property and in 1909 it was sold. The purchaser was William Bailey Partridge of Bacton, Herefordshire. He died shortly after this and his younger son Captain Richard Partridge became the owner of the property.

Captain Richard Crawshay Bailey Partridge (1876-1918) who was unmarried was killed in France in 1918. He was awarded the Military Cross and the Croix de Guerre. There is a memorial window in St Mary’s Church in Abbey Dore with an inscription.

In 1919 the house was advertised for sale and was sold to Lewis’s nephew (mentioned above) Lieutenant Colonel Archer George Prothero (1869-1929) who had frequently visited the estate when he was a child to see his uncle. He lived there with his wife Lavinia for ten years and in 1929 he died. His obituary was in “The Times” and can be read at this reference. As he had no children the estate was inherited by his eldest sister Evelyn Mary Frances Wiseman-Clarke. When she died in 1958 she left it to her son Freke William Wiseman-Clarke.

In 1967, it was sold to the Ward family before selling it in 2018.
