= Gissing Hall =

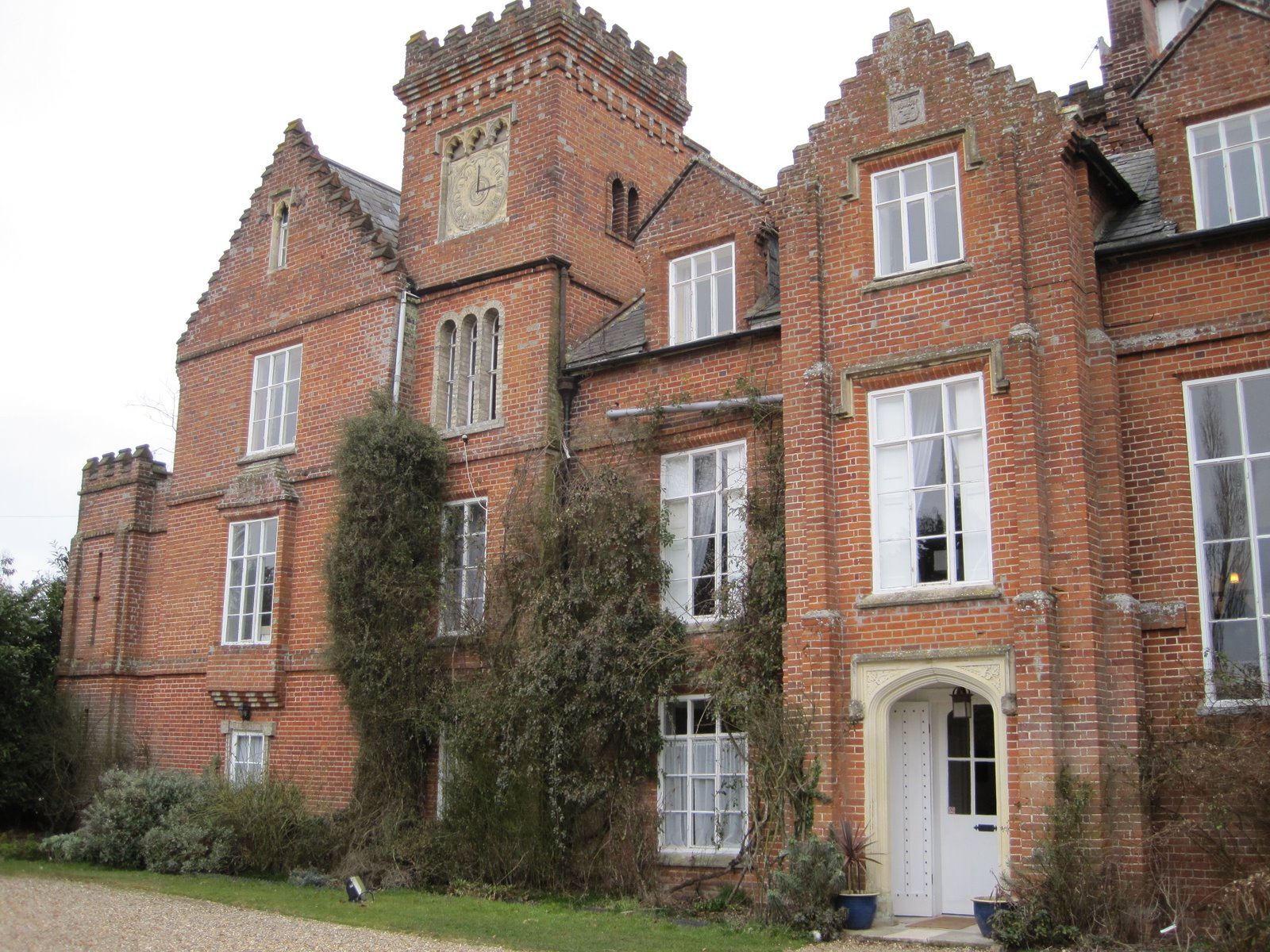
- Interactive map of the Gissing Hall area

General information
- Type: Country house hotel
- Location: Gissing, Norfolk, England
- Coordinates: 52.425573°N 1.150567°E

Website
- http://www.gissinghall.co.uk

Gissing Hall is a listed fifteenth century mansion, situated in five acres of woodland and gardens in the village of Gissing in Norfolk, England. The hall is operated as a hotel and restaurant.

The Gissing estate dates back to the 15th century when it was first owned by the Kemp family. The present Hall was mostly built in the 1820s by the Reverend Sir William Robert Kemp. He graduated from Cambridge in 1813 and in 1816 became the Rector of Gissing. He was then in the interesting position of being both Lord of the Manor and spiritual leader so decided to combine the rectory with his new residence thus creating the present Gissing Hall.

Gissing Hall is a privately owned and run family home, as well as being open to the public. The hotel includes 22 en suite bedrooms for guests, as well as function rooms for weddings, private receptions and corporate events. There is also a restaurant for guests and locals from the surrounding area.

In 2010, Gissing Hall was the subject of a Channel 4 television documentary presented by hotelier Ruth Watson as part of her Country House Rescue series. However, the episode featuring Gissing Hall was not broadcast until 2011.
