= Trereife House =

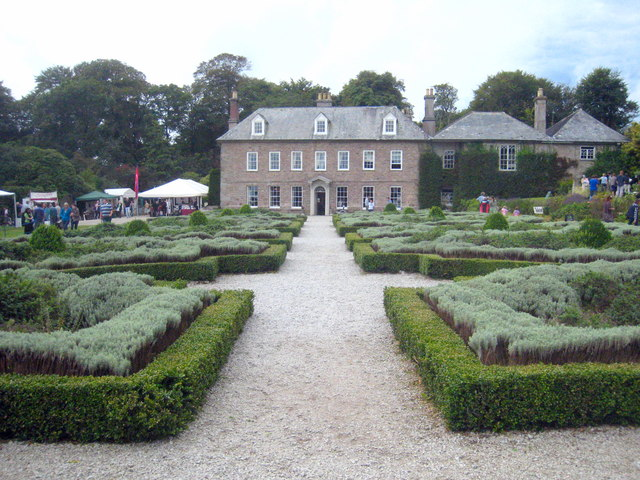
- The house and formal garden in 2011

- Location within Cornwall
- 50.111519°N 5.56509°W
- Type: Country House
- Location: Stable Hobba, Penzance, Cornwall, England

Site notes
- Architectural style: Queen Anne
- Website: trereife.co.uk

Listed Building – Grade II*
- Official name: Trereife Manor
- Designated: 29 July 1950
- Reference no.: 1210364

Trereife House (pronounced Treeve) is a grade II* listed manor house located west of the town of Penzance in Cornwall, England, UK. The house was built in the 18th century and has two storeys and a hipped roof with dormer windows.

== History ==
The first occupants of Trereife were the Nicholls family. Originally a farming family living in the farmhouse at Trereife, they assumed the role of minor gentry after gradually increasing the amount of land they owned over a period of time. John Nicholls, after working as a barrister at the Court of Chancery in London, arranged for a Queen Anne style facade to be added to the original farmhouse. This was completed in 1708.

The house eventually came into the hands of the Le Grice family. Charles Valentine Le Grice (14 February 1773 – 24 December 1858) became the first member of the family to live there when he came to Cornwall in 1796 as the tutor to William John Godolphin (died 1815). William was the son of Mary Nicholls (née Usticke) a wealthy widow and John William Nicholls (deceased). In 1799 Le Grice married Mary Nicholls and they had a son Day Perry (1800 – 19 March 1881). On the death of his wife in 1846, Charles Valentine Le Grice inherited the estate and became a wealthy man.

Day Perry Le Grice was educated at Eton and Oriel College, Oxford and had two children. His first was a daughter, and second born, a son Charles Day Nicholls Le Grice who inherited the estate in 1881. Day Perry was a Deputy Lieutenant and in 1864 High Sheriff of Cornwall.

In 1890 the house was advertised for letting. It had four reception rooms, twelve bedrooms and dressing rooms, a bath room, butler’s room, house-keeper’s room, kitchens and the necessary offices. The property also had a lodge, flower and walled gardens, greenhouse (heated throughout with hot water pipes), kitchen gardens, coach house with coach-men’s rooms, six stalled stables, loose box, harness rooms, loft, laundry and dairy. The lodge was occupied by A C Cuffe Adams Esq.

In 2011, Trereife House was the subject of a Channel 4 television documentary presented by hotelier Ruth Watson as part of her Country House Rescue series. A string of failed business attempts at the house had left it with debts of £100,000, but the situation was turned around by the programme. Its single B&B room prior to the arrival of the film crew was criticised for being poorly maintained and having dated decor. This was upgraded and further rooms were added, and the house began hosting weddings and public events.
