= Chesters (estate) =

Country estate in Scotland

Coordinates: 55.4948°N 2.6210°W

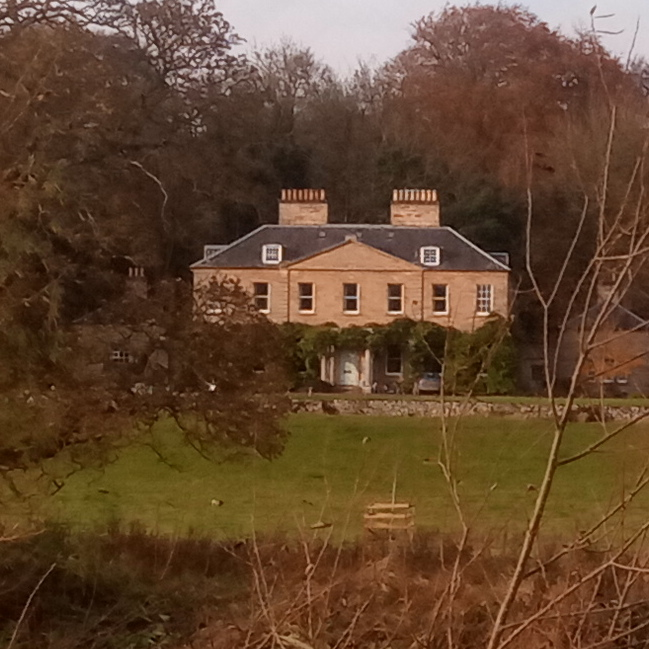
Chesters - a star of Country House Rescue

Chesters is a 1,565-acre (633 ha) country estate near Ancrum, located on the banks of the River Teviot in the Scottish Borders area of Scotland. The estate includes a listed house, workers houses, gardens and extensive grounds. National Grid Reference NT 60842 22512.

== History ==
The house was built for Thomas Elliot Ogilvie who purchased the estate in 1787 with money he obtained while working for the Madras Civil Service. Five years before he had married Hannah Pasley (born Dashwood). By 1790 it had been re- designed by local Borders architect William Eliot for Thomas and Hannah Ogilvie.

Emily Gerard, a writer who inspired Bram Stoker's Dracula, was born here in 1849.

In 2008 and 2011, the house appeared in episodes of the Channel 4 television series Country House Rescue, starring Ruth Watson.

== See also ==
- List of places in the Scottish Borders
- List of places in Scotland
