= To Fortune =

Poem written by Samuel Taylor Coleridge

To Fortune was composed by Samuel Taylor Coleridge in 1793 when he played the lottery in the hope of getting out of debt. The poem was the first work of his to be printed in a major publication.

== Background ==
While Coleridge attended Jesus College, Cambridge, he began to contract debt and was soon overwhelmed by the amount that he owed. With his debts, he decided to travel to London during November 1793 and purchased an Irish Lottery ticket during that time. The occasion prompted him to write the poem To Fortune, on Buying a Ticket in the Irish Lottery, which was published by the Morning Chronicle on 7 November 1793; this was his first printed work. He returned to Cambridge, after buying the lottery ticket, in order to fulfill obligations to meet with some of his schoolmates; he was part of a literary society created by himself along with his friend Charles Le Grice. They first met on 5 November and discussed literature and poetry. On the 13th, he read some of his poems to his fellows.

After a week, he returned to London and began despair to the point that he contemplate suicide. During this time, he stayed in a place that Coleridge was to deem of ill-repute. Of this series of going back and forth between London and Cambridge, he told his brother:

When I returned to Cambridge a multitude of petty Embarrassments buzzed round me, like a Nest of Hornets ... My agitations were delirium — I formed a Party, dashed to London at eleven o'clock at night, and for three days lived in all the tempest of Pleasure — resolved on my return — but I will not shock your religious feelings — I again return to Cambridge — staid a week — such a week! Where Vice has not annihilated Sensibility, there is little need of a Hell! On Sunday night I packed up a few things, — went off in the mail — staid about a week in a strange way, still looking forwards with a kind of recklessness to the dernier resort of misery...

The drawing started 12 November 1793 with a conclusion on 28 November; Coleridge did not win any money, and he began resenting gambling and the lottery system more and more as time went on. Without money and still despairing, Coleridge allowed himself to be pressed into enlistment with the Royal Dragoons in early December 1793.

== Poem ==
The poem reflects on Coleridge's feelings of despair during November 1793 and combines these feelings with those that arise from unrequited love:

Let the little bosom cold
Melt only at the sunbeam ray of gold—
My pale cheeks glow—the big drops start—
The rebel Feeling riots at my heart!

— lines 11–14

The poem ends on a note of hope:

But thou, O Fortune! canst relume
Its deaden'd tints—and thou with hardier bloom
May'st haply tinge its beauties pale,
And yield the unsunn'd stranger to the western gale!

— lines 29–32

== Themes ==
The poem incorporates aspects of Coleridge's feelings of despair, especially about his debt. During this time of despair, he was able to compose poems and managed to become published for the first time. To Lottery, in particular, incorporates a discussion of his debts but also combines it with the effects of unrequited love. The poem serves as a release for his emotional feelings, feelings that date back years and not just those regarding events of 1793. The images within To Fortune could also be bits of parody. John Strachan points out in 2007 that "'To Fortune' gently sends up the stock phrases of a musing and pensive poetic sensibility [...] The poem, with its stale personification [...] trite condemnation of luxury in the eighteenth-century manner [...] and attitudinising invocation [...] is a poem of some literary significance, a parodic composition made from the conventions of what Wordsworth later labelled 'poetic diction'".

In terms of Coleridge's feelings on the lottery system, he began to oppose the idea of a lottery after writing To Fortune. He would later argue that the lottery should be abolished in his Lay Sermon. The abolition of the lottery would prove that the government was able to make society morally correct and serve as a symbol in that regard. Also, he criticized the notion of a lottery in his The Friend, describing it as "that other opprobrium of the Nation, that Mother vice". In 1826, he wrote to James Gillman about the end of the lottery. In particular, he reflected on the actions of Thomas Bish and stated, "I do not undervalue Wealth, even if by descent or by Lottery [though] since Mr Bish mourns in large Capitals, red, blue, and black, in every corner over the Last, the downright Last, you have but small chance, I suspect, of a snug £30,000 from this later source".
