= Riverhill =

Riverhill may refer to:

- Riverhill House, a manor house and gardens in Kent, England
- Riverhill School, a private, non-parochial school in Alabama, United States
- Riverhill Software, a Japanese video game manufacturer
