= Jane Margaret Rogers =

Jane Margaret Rogers of Riverhill, Sevenoaks was the High Sheriff of Kent from March 2009 to March 2010.

== Background ==
Rogers' great grandfather, Henry Arthur Brassey, was High Sheriff of Kent in 1890. She grew up in Wiltshire, where her father was High Sheriff in 1959. She married John Rogers in 1971 and has lived at Riverhill House since then; the house, gardens and estate are open to the public. John Rogers, whose family had farmed at Riverhill since 1840, died in 1995 and the farm is now let. Mrs Rogers is a mother of two and grandmother of six.

== High Sheriff of Kent ==
Rogers was on the board of the appeal for the Rockdale House Association when she was nominated in 2006 and 2007 by the former High Sheriff, R.J. Oldfield, as is normal practice. The nomination process takes three years. She is one in a line of High Sheriffs of Kent which extends for nearly a thousand years. She was replaced as High Sheriff in March 2010 by Peregrine Massey.

=== Changeover service ===
The changeover service with the former High Sheriff took place at St George's Church at Sevenoaks Weald, where she was pricked in on 5 April 2009. The service was attended by the Lord Lieutenant of Kent, and presided over by His Honour Judge Patience, QC, Resident Judge at Maidstone Crown Court.

=== Duties ===
The official High Sheriff costume of Jane Margaret Rogers was a dark-coloured suit or coat dress with buttons, shoe buckles, frills at the neck and end of the sleeves and a hat. As High Sheriff her duties and tasks included looking after and entertaining High Court judges, judges, and visiting judges, which could happen at her home or within the Courts. She was required for Royal visits but this is something the Lord Lieutenant of Kent would usually deal with. Her duties were officially described as follows:

Ensuring the well being and protection of High Court Judges when on Circuit in the County; attending them in Court during the legal terms; undertaking duties involving people from voluntary and statutory bodies, particularly those engaged in the maintenance of the criminal system; hosting her Justice Service at All Saints Church, in Maidstone.

=== Emblem ===
Jane Margaret Rogers used her late husband's coat of arms - three stags either side of a chevron - plus the Brassey mallard, from her own family's arms.

== Country House Rescue ==
In 2010, Jane Margaret Rogers appeared in an episode of Channel 4's television documentary Country House Rescue. The documentary charted the attempts of Rogers and her family to restore and revive Riverhill House and gardens, with the help of hotelier and country house expert Ruth Watson.

Civic offices
Preceded by R.J. Oldfield	High Sheriff of Kent; March 2009 – March 2010	Succeeded by Peregrine Massey
