= Whitbourne Hall =

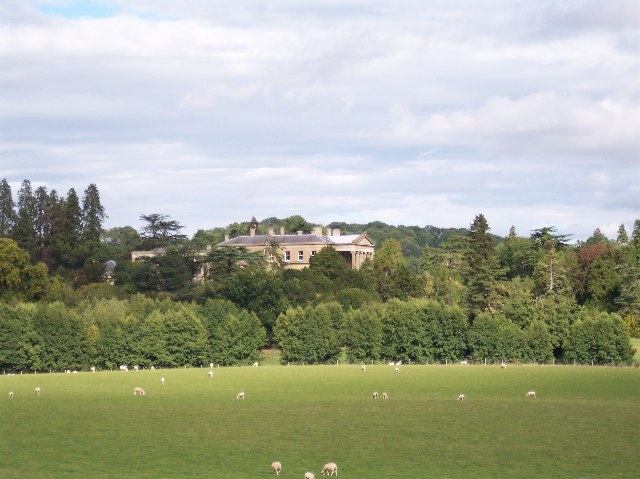
- Interactive map of the Whitbourne Hall area

General information
- Type: country house
- Architectural style: Greek Revival
- Location: Whitbourne, Herefordshire, England
- Coordinates: 52.2084°N 2.4342°W
- Inaugurated: 1860

Design and construction
- Architect: E. W. Elmslie

Website
- http://www.whitbournehall.com

Whitbourne Hall is a Grade II* listed Greek Revival country house located in the village of Whitbourne in Herefordshire (near the Worcestershire border), England.

The hall was first constructed in 1860 by the architect E. W. Elmslie, who also designed the Great Malvern railway station, as well as a number of other notable buildings in Worcestershire. The house was built for Edward Bickerton Evans, an amateur archaeologist who had made his fortune from the vinegar factory set up by his father. His firm, Hill and Evans, had their London HQ at 33–35 Eastcheap built to the elaborate Gothic designs of Robert Lewis Roumieu, who is believed to have added the conservatory to the house.

Today, Whitbourne Hall is situated in eight acres of gardens, and is divided into twenty-three private residences. However, the hall is hired out as a venue for weddings, private receptions and corporate events. The hall and grounds have also been used for cultural events such as theatre productions, choral performances and the Four Shires Festival.

In April 2010, Whitbourne Hall was the subject of a Channel 4 television documentary presented by hotelier Ruth Watson as part of her Country House Rescue series.
