= John Rogers (naturalist) =

English barrister, naturalist and gardener

John Rogers (1807–1867) was an English barrister, known as a naturalist particularly interested in orchids, and gardener.

== Early life ==
He was the son of John Rogers of London, and was often called John Rogers, Jun. He matriculated at Balliol College, Oxford in 1826, graduating B.A. in 1830 M.A. in 1833. He was called to the bar at the Inner Temple in 1836. He was from a wealthy family background, and an only son, and was able to lead a gentlemanly life.

== Career ==
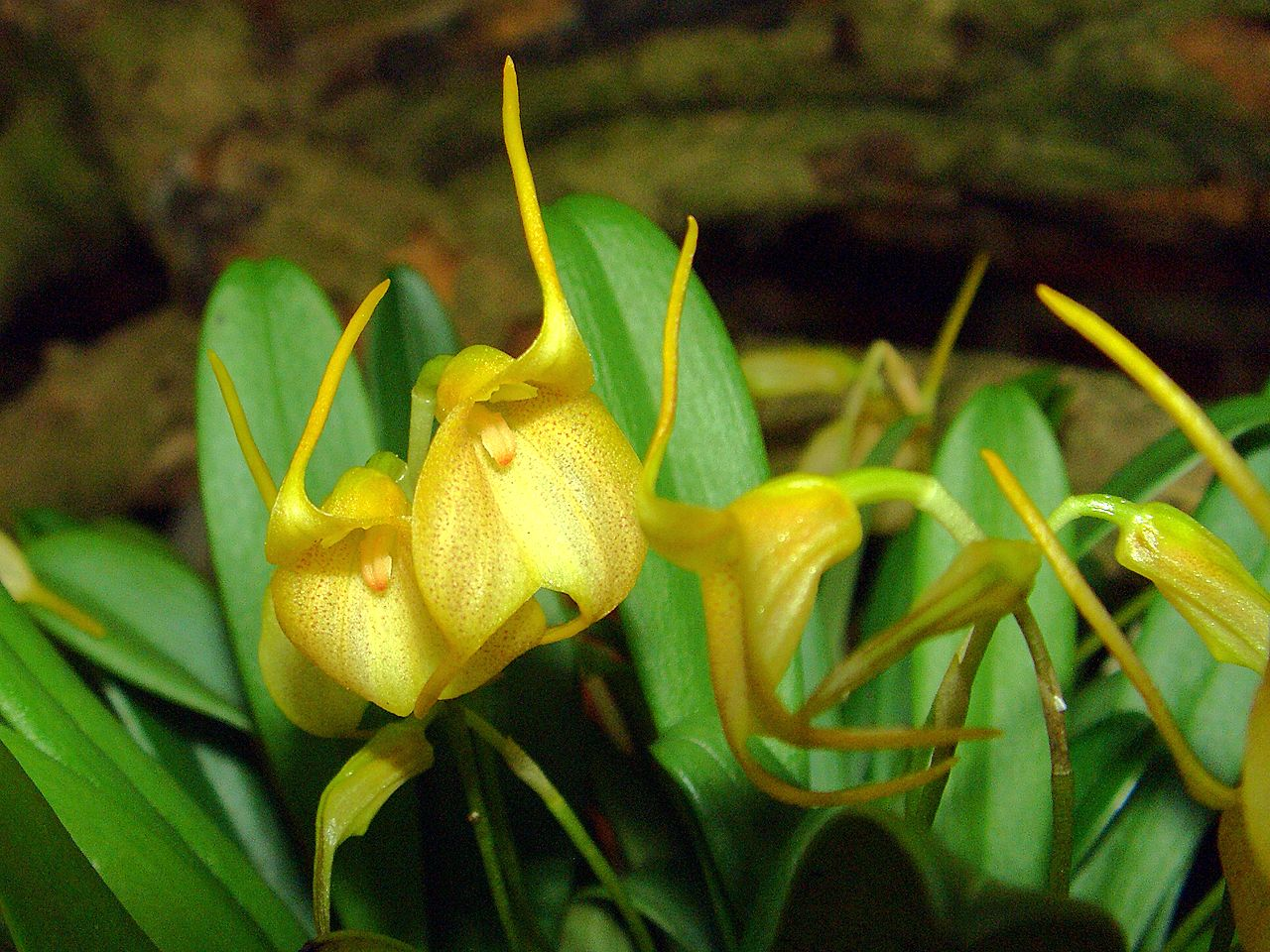
Masdevallia floribunda, a Central American orchid cultivated by John Rogers

Rogers was elected a Fellow of the Royal Society on 5 December 1839. He resided at Riverhill House near Sevenoaks, Kent, where he bought the estate in 1840. It was in that year that his father, John Rogers "of Upper Tooting", died. Rogers was a member of the Royal Horticultural Society and supported plant hunting. He raised plants such as Bessera elegans.

Among plants collected in the Real del Monte area of Mexico was one sent to Rogers, and initially named Hydrotaenia meleagris. An account of it was published by John Lindley in 1838, in Edwards's Botanical Register. Masdevallia floribunda was in Rogers's collection by 1843. Charles Darwin referenced a Myanthus collected for Rogers in Demerara, in an 1862 paper.

== Personal life ==
Rogers married in 1833 Harriet Thornton, daughter of John Thornton of Clapham and his wife Eliza Parry. They had five sons and four daughters. Of those, Reginald Wellford Rogers, the second son, became vicar of Cookham; and the fifth son, Walter Francis Rogers, spent a period in Canada.

The eldest son John Thornton Rogers (1834–1900) married in 1862 Margaret Bagwell, daughter of John Bagwell the Member of Parliament. The male line continued with their son John Middleton Rogers (born 1864), father of John Ernest Rogers (born 1900). Riverhill House remains in the family.
