= Riverhill House =

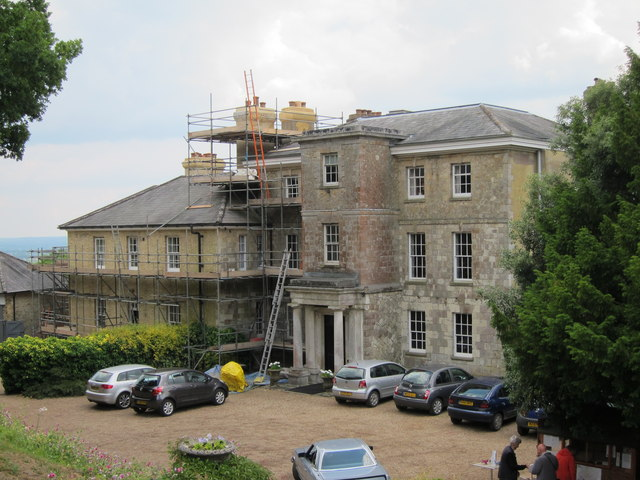
- Riverhill House, in March 2011.

General information
- Type: Manor house
- Architectural style: Queen Anne
- Location: Sevenoaks, Kent, England
- Coordinates: 51.2475°N 0.208056°E
- Owner: Jane Margaret Rogers

Website
- riverhillgardens.co.uk

Riverhill House is a Grade II listed rag-stone Queen Anne manor house located on the southern edge of Sevenoaks in Kent, England. The house and estate, of 130 acres (53 ha), are located directly to the south of Knole Park, near to the villages of Sevenoaks Weald and Underriver. The gardens are open to the public from March to September.

== House ==
Originally built on the site of a Tudor farmstead in 1714, Riverhill House and estate were purchased in 1840 by John Rogers. A keen botanist and a contemporary of Charles Darwin, Rogers purchased the property because of its sheltered location and lime-free soil. Rogers was an early member of the Royal Horticultural Society and a patron of Victorian plant-hunters.

The house has been enlarged and improved since then, by subsequent generations of the Rogers family up until 1900. Today, the house is still a family home in private ownership of the Rogers family.

In March 2010, Riverhill House was the subject of a Channel 4 television documentary presented by hotelier Ruth Watson as part of the Country House Rescue series. The documentary featured the current owner and director of the house Jane Margaret Rogers, and the leading maze designer, Adrian Fisher.

== Gardens ==
The Riverhill estate includes gardens first established by John Rogers in 1842. There are cedar trees planted in the 1840s and the Turkey oak was grown from acorn collected in Russia by an ancestor who served in the Crimean War. The Himalayan gardens and estate grounds are used for a variety of events, including weddings.
