= Church of St Barnabas, Swanmore =

Church in Hampshire, England

Coordinates: 50°56′39″N 1°10′52″W

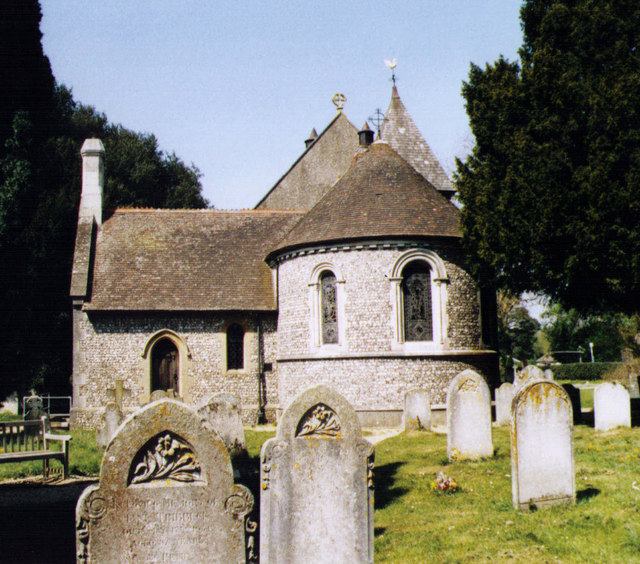
The Church of St Barnabas

The Church of St Barnabas is the Church of England parish church of Swanmore near Southampton in Hampshire, England. It was constructed in 1844 and is a grade II listed building. The church is under the ecclesiastic jurisdiction of the Diocese of Portsmouth and the Deanery of Bishop's Waltham.

== History ==
The church was constructed in 1844 and was designed by Benjamin Ferrey in the Neo-Norman architectural style. The church was originally established under the ecclesiastic oversight of the Diocese of Winchester. In 1846, the Church of England's Church Commissioners petitioned the Supreme Governor of the Church of England Queen Victoria to merge the nearby parishes of Droxford and Bishops Waltham into St Barnabas's in Swanmore as they had agreed with the Bishop of Winchester, which the Queen granted. The vestry and chancel were extended in 1863 with a tower and new windows being installed in 1876. In 1927, St Barnabas' was transferred from the Diocese of Winchester to the Diocese of Portsmouth following the creation of the new independent Diocese of Portsmouth. The church was renovated in 2011 with a new boiler being installed as well as the tower's roof being re-tiled.

The church has a graveyard attached to it, however it is full and no longer open to future burials though it does retain an area for interment of cremated ashes. It is also used for concerts.
