= Gissing, Norfolk =

Village in Norfolk, England

Coordinates: 52.4257°N 1.15516°E

Gissing
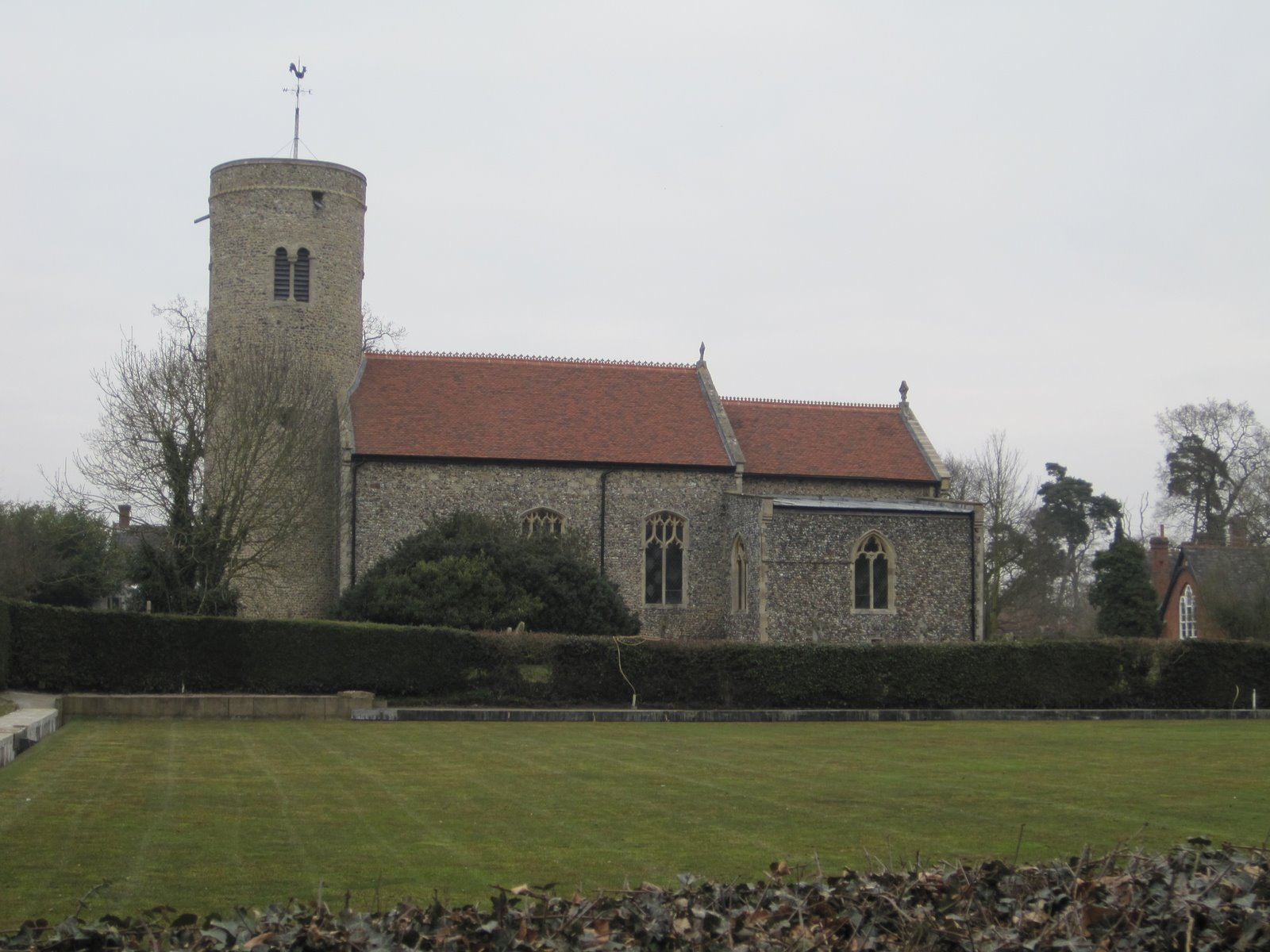
- St Mary, Gissing

- Location within Norfolk
- Area: 3.13 sq mi (8.1 km^{2})
- Population: 257 (2021 census)
  - Density: 82/sq mi (32/km^{2})
- OS grid reference: TM146855
  - London: 83 miles (134 km)
- Civil parish: Gissing
- District: South Norfolk
- Shire county: Norfolk
- Region: East
- Country: England
- Sovereign state: United Kingdom
- Post town: DISS
- Postcode district: IP22
- Dialling code: 01379
- Police: Norfolk
- Fire: Norfolk
- Ambulance: East of England
- UK Parliament: Waveney Valley

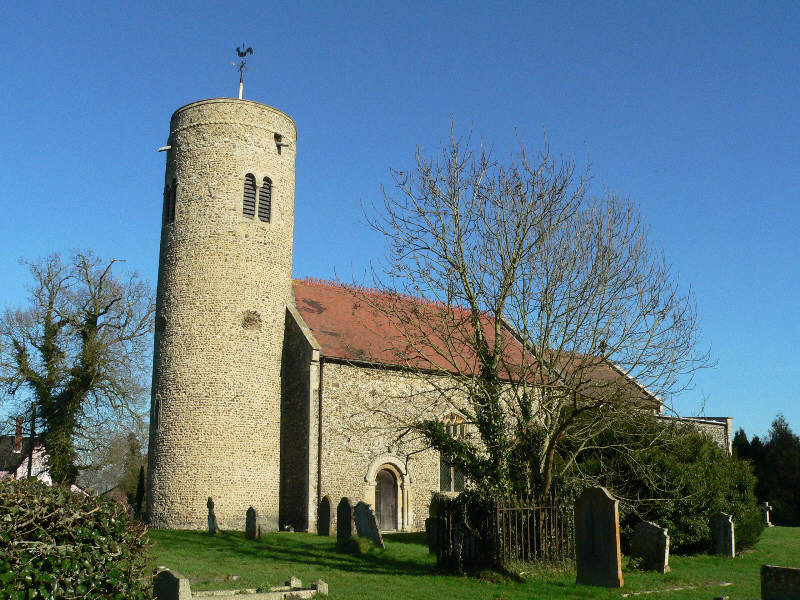
Gissing St Mary

Gissing (/ˈɡɪsɪŋ/ GHISS-ing) is a village and civil parish in the English county of Norfolk.

Gissing is located about 6 miles (9.7 km) north of Diss and 15 miles (24 km) south-west of Norwich.

== History ==
Gissing's name is of Anglo-Saxon origin and derives from the Old English for Gyssa's or Gyssi's people.

In the Domesday Book, Gissing is listed as a settlement of 55 households in the hundred of Diss. In 1086, the village was divided between the estates of King William, Robert Malet, Roger Bigod and the Abbey of St. Edmund.

Gissing Hall, a 15th century mansion house, is located in the parish. Today the hall operates as a hotel and restaurant.

During the Second World War, a pillbox and searchlight battery were built in Gissing to defend against a possible German invasion.

On 29 January 1944, two Consolidated B-24 Liberators of the United States Army Air Force collided in mid-air above Gissing whilst assembling for a strategic bombing raid on Frankfurt. A total of 14 aviators were killed in the collision.

== Geography ==
According to the 2021 census, Gissing has a total population of 257 people which demonstrates an increase from the 252 people listed in the 2011 census.

== St. Mary's Church ==
Gissing's parish church is dedicated to Saint Mary and is one of Norfolk's 124 remaining round-tower churches, dating from the Eleventh Century. St. Mary's is located within the village on Lower Street and has been Grade I listed since 1959. The church holds church services twice a month and is the focus for an active Friends of Gissing Church who fundraise for maintenance projects on the building.

St. Mary's holds an elaborate mausoleum to the Kemp family and several marble monuments inside.

== Governance ==
Gissing is an electoral ward for local elections and is part of the district of South Norfolk.

The village's national constituency is Waveney Valley which has been represented by the Green Party's Adrian Ramsay since 2024.

== War Memorial ==
Gissing's war memorial takes the form of a rough-hewn Celtic cross with a sword of sacrifice and is located just outside of St. Mary's Churchyard. The fundraising for the memorial was completed by a committee led by the Reverend W.E.S. Cooper with the plot being donated by the Sir Kenneth H. Kemp. The memorial was unveiled on 7 March 1920 by Sir Kenneth Kemp and John Bowers, Bishop of Thetford. The memorial lists the following names for the First World War:

Rank	Name	Unit	Date of death	Burial/Commemoration
Sgt.	Cyril R. Leathers	9th Bn., Norfolk Regiment	17 Nov. 1915	Hollybrook Memorial
Pte.	Harold A. Huggins	Depot, Bedfordshire Regiment	10 Jul. 1918	St. Mary's Churchyard
Pte.	Ernest V. Leathers	4th Bn., Grenadier Guards	25 Sep. 1916	Thiepval Memorial
Pte.	Robert Lockwood	10th Bn., Hampshire Regiment	2 Sep. 1918	Karasouli Cemetery
Pte.	Reginald J. Woolsey	7th (City) Bn., London Regiment	31 Dec. 1917	St. Mary's Churchyard
Pte.	John Randle	7th Bn., Norfolk Regiment	16 Dec. 1915	Guards Cemetery
Pte.	George W. Sandy	7th Bn., Norfolk Regt.	13 Oct. 1915	Loos Memorial
Pte.	Leonard C. Huggins	8th Bn., Norfolk Regt.	19 Jul. 1916	Thiepval Memorial
Pte.	Benjamin M. Ringer	9th Bn., Norfolk Regt.	15 Apr. 1918	Tyne Cot

The following name was added after the Second World War:

Rank	Name	Unit	Date of death	Burial/Commemoration
Sgt.	Wilfred T. Francis	No.42 Operational Training Unit	6 Jun. 1944	Runnymede Memorial
