= Tasburgh House Hotel =

House and former hotel in Bath, England

Coordinates: 51.3918°N 2.3350°W

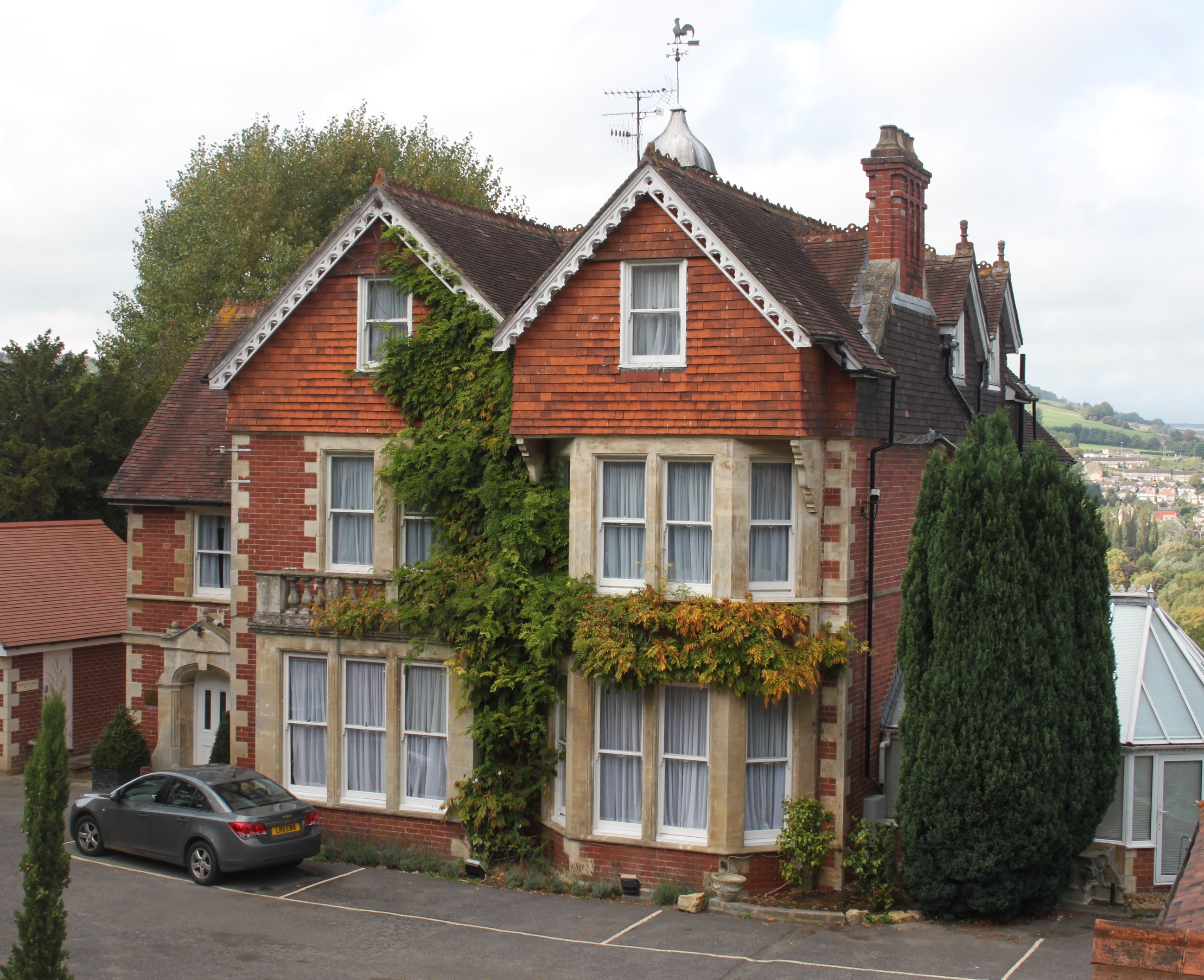
Tasburgh House Hotel

Tasburgh House Hotel was a hotel in Bath, Somerset, England.

Tasburgh House was built in 1891 by photographer John Berryman. Although Bath was being built exclusively of honey-coloured Bath Stone, Berryman's influential position (Royal Family's official photographer) gave him permission to build the house with red brick. Tasburgh House was the first and only red-brick-built house in Bath at that time. Original deeds show that the house was initially named 'Avonhurst', the name was changed to 'Tasburgh House' at some point before 1925, although the exact date is unknown.

The house still stands in its original form and the exterior has not changed significantly. It was converted from three flats into a hotel in approximately 1969. The hotel was owned and managed by Susan Keeling from 1996 until 2019. During this time, it received extensive investment and refurbishment, including the addition of three guest bedrooms and multi-level terracing at the rear of the property. Tasburgh House Hotel has featured twice on the TV series The Hotel Inspector.

In 2015, the hotel won 'Best UK Luxury Guest House' in the World Hotel Awards.

In 2019, the hotel was sold to The Three Bears Ventures Limited. The building then operated as a 15 bedroom boutique hotel with a bar (residents only), with Grant Atkinson as general manager.

The hotel closed permanently in 2020. It is now a private house once again.
