= Charles Valentine Le Grice =

- Born: 14 February 1773; Bury St. Edmunds, England
- Died: 24 December 1858 (aged 85); Cornwall
- Occupation: Priest, translator,
- Literary movement: Romanticism
- Relatives: Samuel Le Grice (brother)

Charles Valentine Le Grice (1773–1858) was an Anglican priest, an associate of Charles Lamb and Samuel Taylor Coleridge, a squib writer, and a translator of Longus.

== Life ==
Le Grice was born in Bury St. Edmunds to a clergyman father Charles Le Grice on 14 February 1773. Little is known of Le Grice's early life but he was enrolled in Christ's Hospital some time around 1780 where he became a friend of other famous students including Leigh Hunt, Charles Lamb, and Samuel Taylor Coleridge. His brother, Samuel Le Grice was also a classmate of Charles Lamb and was known to be a great comfort to Lamb after the murder of his mother at the hands of his sister Mary. Upon leaving Christ's Hospital as a Senior Grecian he passed on to Trinity College, Cambridge. In 1796 Charles Le Grice left London for Cornwall where he became a tutor to William John Godolphin (died 1815), a son of a wealthy widow, Mrs Nicholls (née Usticke) who lived on the estate of Trereife House, near Penzance. In 1789 Le Grice was ordained and in 1799 he married Mary Nicholls (died 1821). They had a son Day Perry (1800 – 19 March 1881) who succeeded him to the Trereife estate. After the death of both Mrs Nicholls and her son (of the first marriage), Le Grice became a wealthy man. Le Grice had no contact with Charles Lamb after 1796 until they met again in 1834, the years of Lamb's death. He was the first librarian of the Royal Geological Society of Cornwall. Le Grice died at Trereife on 24 December 1858 and is buried at St Maddern's Church, Madron.

== Posterity ==
Charles Le Grice left little to posterity except some squibs, some reminiscences of Lamb and Coleridge, and a translation of the Greek Author Longus. Instead Le Grice is mostly known through stories told by others. Lamb wrote some reflections on Le Grice in the essay Grace before Meat. Henry Crabb Robinson, probably the best diarist of the age, wrote more than once of Le Grice. One story records Le Grice during the meeting of a debaters society in which when asked to speak upon who was the greatest orator – Pitt, Fox, or Burke, Le Grice replied "Sheridan." Le Grice was described to E.V. Lucas by Lord Courtney as "a jocund rubicund little man much of Charles Lamb`s height but plumper, full of pun and jokes, very genial, and in quality rather suggestive of one of Thomas Peacock`s diviners than of a man steeped in theological rancour."

In 1838 Le Grice published reminiscences of Lamb and Coleridge in the Gentleman's Magazine. Lucas reflects that it is a pity that a man who could write with such discernment as this should have done so little.
