= Abbey Dore =

Village in Herefordshire, England

Coordinates: 51.970°N 2.895°W

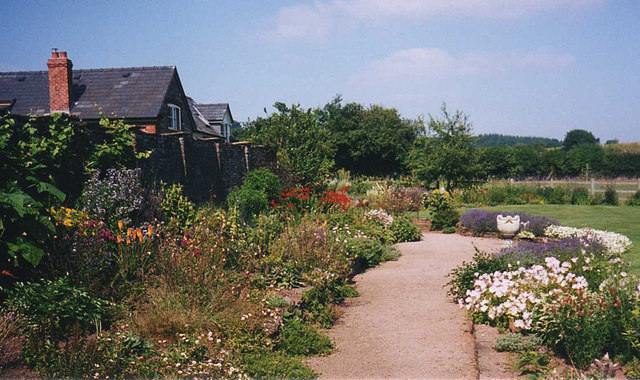
- The gardens at Abbey Dore Court

- Location within Herefordshire
- Population: 385 (2011)
- OS grid reference: SD3830
- Civil parish: Abbey Dore
- Unitary authority: Herefordshire
- Ceremonial county: Herefordshire
- Region: West Midlands
- Country: England
- Sovereign state: United Kingdom
- Post town: HEREFORD
- Postcode district: HR2
- Dialling code: 01981
- Police: West Mercia
- Fire: Hereford and Worcester
- Ambulance: West Midlands
- UK Parliament: Hereford and South Herefordshire

Abbey Dore is a village and civil parish in Herefordshire, England, known for Dore Abbey, a 12th-century Cistercian abbey, which was expanded in the 13th century.

The name Abbey Dore came into being in the 18th century, combining the Modern English word abbey for the Cistercian abbey in the village and the river name dore from Primitive Welsh meaning 'water'. Its name in Welsh was Llangernyw, which may show a connection to the Cornovii tribe of the West Midlands.

The village is situated in the Golden Valley, and has a population of 342, increasing to 385 at the 2011 census.

The Grade I listed parish church of St Mary is the former abbey church. It is on Historic England's list of buildings at risk.

The village contains Abbey Dore Court, a large country house built in 1861.

Abbeydore railway station closed in 1941. It was on the Great Western Railway branch line linking Pontrilas and Hay-on-Wye. The railway always spelt the name of the village as one word.
