= Swanmore =

Village and parish in Hampshire, England

Coordinates: 50.942257°N 1.179353°W

- Location within Hampshire
- Population: 2,871; 3,017 (2011 Census)
- OS grid reference: SU576162
- Civil parish: Swanmore
- District: City of Winchester
- Shire county: Hampshire
- Region: South East
- Country: England
- Sovereign state: United Kingdom
- Post town: Southampton
- Postcode district: SO32
- Dialling code: 01489
- Police: Hampshire and Isle of Wight
- Fire: Hampshire and Isle of Wight
- Ambulance: South Central
- UK Parliament: Winchester
- Website: http://www.swanmore.hampshire.org.uk/ Swanmore Parish Council

Swanmore is a rural village and civil parish situated in the Meon Valley, Hampshire, England, close to Bishop's Waltham.

Swanmore was originally set up to provide homes for workers in local brickworks. As such, the houses in the village are mainly early and mid-Victorian brick buildings, although there are some older houses, especially in the hamlet of Upper Swanmore, which is located only 1/4 mile north of the main village. The village continued to thrive after the closure of these brickworks, and at one time had many shops and services, however many of these closed with the advent of easier transport to nearby towns, but Swanmore does still have a village shop, post office and hairdresser.

Hill Place is a grade II listed Georgian country villa located in the parish.

== Churches ==
The church, St Barnabas was built when the village gained independence in the 19th century, whereas before it was part of the parish of Droxford. With its independence Swanmore gained its own resident priest and parsonage. As well as St Barnabas, Swanmore has a Methodist chapel which was built in 1863.

The Paterson centre, which was built to replace the old parish room, was built in the late 1980s and named after retired Swanmore vicar Rev. Ron Paterson and in remembrance of the three members of his family who died while he was serving the parish.

== Education ==
Swanmore houses the schools Swanmore Primary School (a Church of England aided school) and Swanmore College, which is the secondary school for neighbouring towns and villages. The nearest major town is Fareham, six miles south. Swanmore also has two pre-schools, Swanmore Pre-School and the Greenery.

== Notable people ==
- Cyril Raikes
- Stephen Leacock
