= Barrhill, South Ayrshire =

Village in South Ayrshire, Scotland

Coordinates: 55.103246°N 4.770126°W

Barrhill: Scottish Gaelic: Am Barr; Scots: Baurhill
- Location within South Ayrshire
- Population: 400
- OS grid reference: NX2382
  - Edinburgh: 85 mi (137 km)
  - London: 314 mi (505 km)
- Council area: South Ayrshire
- Lieutenancy area: Ayrshire and Arran
- Country: Scotland
- Sovereign state: United Kingdom
- Post town: Girvan
- Postcode district: KA26
- Dialling code: 01465
- Police: Scotland
- Fire: Scottish
- Ambulance: Scottish
- UK Parliament: Ayr, Carrick and Cumnock
- Scottish Parliament: Carrick, Cumnock and Doon Valley

Barrhill (Scots: Baurhill) is a village in South Ayrshire, Scotland with a population of approximately 400 in 2001. and 250 in 2019. "Barrhill" is defined by the area covered by Barrhill Community Council.

While the surrounding area is predominantly agricultural land, the main local employer is Barr Construction. In Main Street, at the outskirts of the village is Barrhill Bowling Club, affectionately known to locals in years gone by as "The BBC".

The Crosswater (a tributary of the River Stinchar – not to be confused with the Cross Water of Luce, flows through the village. A village vote in 2022 changed the name of the community-owned pub to "The Crosswater" in 2022.

Barrhill became a biosphere community in 2022.

Barrhill Primary School serves the local 5–11 year old's education. In the 2006/7 academic year it had a roll of 34 pupils.

Barrhill Community Interest Company is a signatory with the windfarms Mark Hill and Kilgallioch, on behalf of the residents of the Barrhill Council area. Thus the community of Barrhill council area were entitled for 25 years starting about 2009 a stipend from the farms to benefit of the community. Currently a winter benefit payment to all residents is given and access to funding for education and training including driving lessons. Access to the funds for individuals or relevant groups is administered via Foundation Scotland.

Barrhill Development Trust, a charity registered with the Office of the Scottish Charity Register, holds the community facilities in trust for the residents of Barrhill including the memorial hall, pub, bowling green and play park.

Kildonan House is an impressive early 20th century mansion and former convent school, located slightly north of Barrhill. Originally constructed as the home of Euan Wallace MP.

== Transport ==
Barrhill lies on the A714 Road between Girvan and Newton Stewart. In addition, Barrhill railway station, on the Glasgow South Western Line is approximately 1/2 mile (800 metres) southwest of the village. This station featured in The Five Red Herrings, a 1931 Lord Peter Wimsey detective novel by Dorothy L. Sayers.

== Local history ==
In 1665, by the side of Cross Water in Barrhill, John Murchie and Daniel Mieklewrick were found by soldiers to be in possession of Bibles and assumed to be Covenanters and shot to death. They were buried on the spot, and a memorial was built, known as "The Martyrs' Tomb". It is said that the soldiers took their Bibles and burned them back at the garrison in Kildonan House.

"The Martyrs' Tomb Walk" is now a popular scenic walk which follows the banks of Cross Water for 600 metres (650 yards) from the bridge in the village centre to the tomb itself.
