= Whitbourne, Herefordshire =

Village in Herefordshire, England

Coordinates: 52.20782°N 2.40678°W

Whitbourne
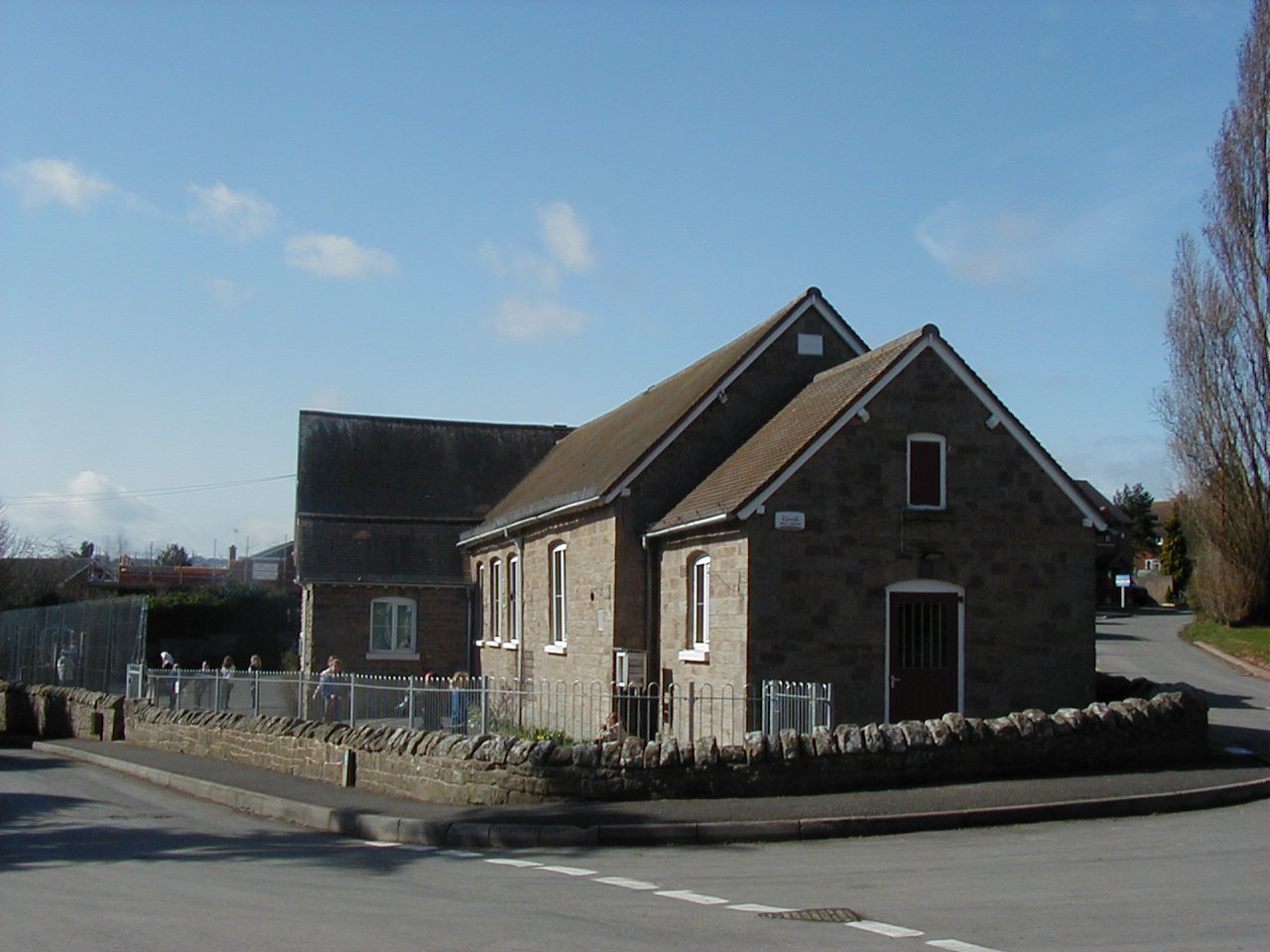
- Whitbourne C of E Independent School & Hub - WISH

- Location within Herefordshire
- Population: 799 (2011)
- OS grid reference: SO723567
  - London: 146m
- Civil parish: Whitbourne
- Unitary authority: Herefordshire
- Ceremonial county: Herefordshire
- Region: West Midlands
- Country: England
- Sovereign state: United Kingdom
- Post town: Worcester
- Postcode district: WR6
- Dialling code: 01886
- Police: West Mercia
- Fire: Hereford and Worcester
- Ambulance: West Midlands
- UK Parliament: North Herefordshire

Whitbourne (Anglo-Saxon for "white stream") is a village in Eastern Herefordshire, England on the banks of the River Teme and close to the A44. It is close to Bringsty Common on one side and the border of Worcestershire on the other. Around 400 people live in the village itself with about as many residing in surrounding houses and farms. It has a Welsh Water pumping station, which supplies the town of Bromyard and the surrounding area and which flooded in July 2007.

Whitbourne Church of England Primary School was a voluntary controlled school located at the centre of the village. Pupil numbers fluctuated between 40 and 70 and closed due to falling numbers in July 2013 but a local group opened the premises, with the permission of the landlords, the church, as a free school WISH - in September 2013. This closed after a short while.

The village currently has one pub, The Live at Whitbourne. The village shop, which is staffed and managed entirely by volunteers, is located in new premises south of the school: it has a recycling/composting arrangement for all its unsold fruit and vegetables, with effect from 2021. It remained open every day throughout the Covid-19 pandemic of 2020-21, to the huge benefit of the community. As a non-profit, it ploughs money back into community efforts.

Whitbourne Hall is a grade II* listed neo-Palladian country house located outside the village. The hall is divided into private residences, but is hired out for private receptions, business conferences and group tours.

Whitbourne Court by the church was once the summer home of the Bishop of Hereford, Francis Godwin, who wrote a story called The Man in the Moone, published posthumously in 1638, which has been considered by some critics to be one of the earliest works of science fiction.

== See also ==
- List of civil parishes in Herefordshire
- List of places in Herefordshire
