= Ruth Watson =

English hotelier, restaurateur, broadcaster and food writer

- Born: 1950 (age 75–76); London, England
- Occupations: Hotelier, restaurateur, broadcaster and food writer
- Known for: Presenting: The Hotel Inspector; Country House Rescue; Ruth Watson's Hotel Rescue
- Spouse: David Watson (1981-present)
- Website: Official website

Ruth Watson is an English hotelier, restaurateur, broadcaster and food writer.

== Early life and career ==
Born in London, Ruth Watson was educated in London and at Westonbirt School in Gloucestershire. After taking up a career in graphic design, she became an inspector for the Good Food Guide.

In 1983, Watson and her husband David bought Hintlesham Hall in Hintlesham, Suffolk, as a restaurant and cookery school from Robert Carrier, which over six years they turned into a 33-room hotel, with an 18-hole golf course. In 1986 she featured with her family in a Bisto gravy advert. In 1990 they bought the Fox and Goose Inn at Fressingfield, launching it as one of Britain's first gastropubs. In November 1999, Watson and her husband bought the Crown and Castle Hotel in Orford near Woodbridge, Suffolk, which they fully restored and ran as a modern country house hotel. In October 2017 Watson sold her interest in the Crown and Castle, stating "dealing with bureacracy [sic] has long overtaken the core business of cooking and serving good food".

In 2020 they opened Watson and Walpole, a neighbourhood Italian restaurant, together with their partner and head chef, Rob Walpole. It is listed in the Michelin Guide and rated as Very Good in the Good Food Guide.

In 2010 the University of Suffolk awarded Watson an Honorary Doctorate for services to hospitality.

== Food writing ==
Watson's hotel experience brought her to the eye of various publishers, and she was asked in 1994 by friend Delia Smith to be a contributing food editor on Sainsbury's Magazine. Watson subsequently became food editor of the Daily Mail Weekend magazine, for which she was shortlisted for a Glenfiddich Award as newspaper cookery writer in 2001, and won twice as Cookery Writer of the year – in 1997 and 2000. Watson has written three books: the Really Helpful Cookbook published in October 2000 by Ebury Press; the slimming book Fat Girl Slim, while her cook book Something for the Weekend is in its third edition.

== Broadcasting career ==
In 2005, Watson began presenting the Channel 5 television series The Hotel Inspector. In each episode of this observational documentary series, Watson would visit a struggling British hotel and try to turn their fortunes by giving advice and suggestions to the owner. Watson's direct style appealed to viewers and The Hotel Inspector became one of Channel 5's most popular series of the 2000s (the show won a Royal Television Society Award in November 2006). Despite this, Watson decided not to undertake a fourth series, and was succeeded on the programme by hotelier Alex Polizzi.

In November 2007, Watson signed an exclusive two-year deal with Channel 4 to front a number of television shows, the first of which explores the commercial development of Britain's country houses. Titled, Country House Rescue, the series was broadcast on Channel 4 on Tuesday nights in December 2008 – January 2009, and gained audiences of up to 2.7 million on its first run. A mini-series of catch-up episodes were broadcast a year later. A second series of Country House Rescue was commissioned by Channel 4, and started airing from March 2010. A third series aired from March 2011, and a further series of catch-up episodes aired from August 2011. However, Watson has stated on her own website that she will not present any more series of Country House Rescue in the future.

Watson also starred in another TV show that she described as "Grand Designs meets The Hotel Inspector" where she helped aspiring hoteliers start their businesses. The programme, titled Ruth Watson's Hotel Rescue, premiered on Channel 4 at 8.00pm on Wednesday, 30 September 2009, and continued to air throughout October of that year. However, Ruth Watson's Hotel Rescue was not recommissioned for any further series.

In April 2010, Watson guest-presented the Funk & Soul Show on BBC 6 Music, standing in for Craig Charles.

In 2013, Watson presented Ruth Watson Means Business!, a 15-part series on Channel 4.

== Personal life ==
Watson and her husband live in a 16th-century farmhouse in Suffolk, 15 minutes away from Watson and Walpole in Framlingham. The garden and 20 acres of orchard, fields and meadows have been organic for over 30 years. Hedgerows, copses and hundreds of native and specimen trees have been planted.
