= St Mawes =

Village in Cornwall, England

Coordinates: 50°09′29″N 5°01′05″W

St Mawes: Cornish: Lannvowsedh
- Village
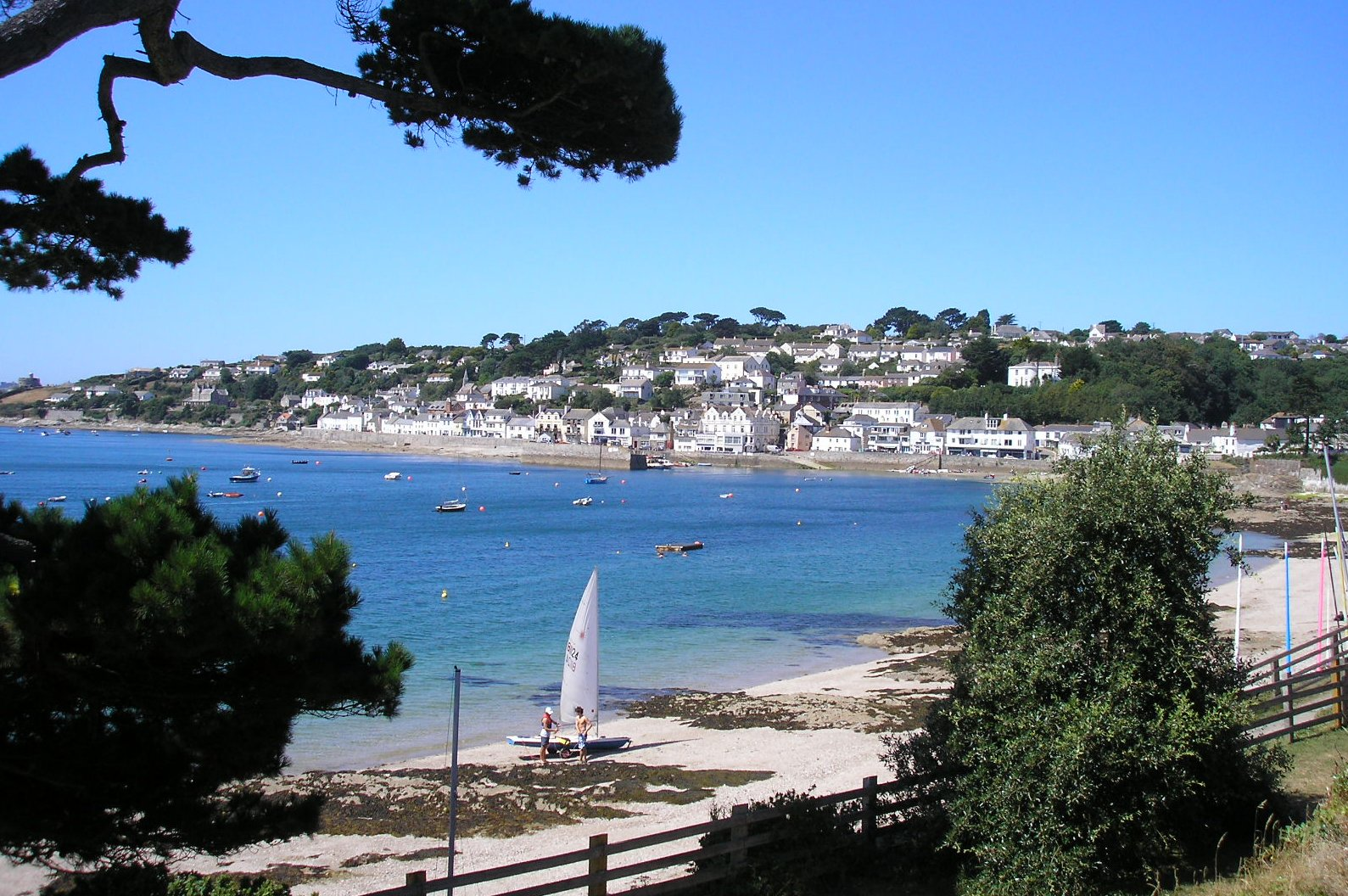

- Location within Cornwall
- OS grid reference: SW845330
- Civil parish: St Just-in-Roseland
- Unitary authority: Cornwall
- Ceremonial county: Cornwall
- Region: South West
- Country: England
- Sovereign state: United Kingdom
- Post town: Truro
- Postcode district: TR2
- Police: Devon and Cornwall
- Fire: Cornwall
- Ambulance: South Western
- UK Parliament: Truro and Falmouth

St Mawes (Cornish: Lannvowsedh, meaning Mowsedh's holy enclosure) is a village on the end of the Roseland Peninsula, in the eastern side of Falmouth harbour, on the south coast of Cornwall, England. The village, formerly two separate hamlets, lies on the east bank of the Carrick Roads, a large waterway created after the Ice Age from an ancient valley which flooded as the melt waters caused the sea level to rise. The immense natural harbour thus created is claimed to be the third largest in the world. St Mawes was once a busy fishing port, but the trade declined during the 20th century and the village now serves as a popular tourist location, with many properties functioning as holiday accommodation. The village is in the civil parish of St Just in Roseland and lies within the Cornwall Area of Outstanding Natural Beauty (AONB).

== History and geography ==
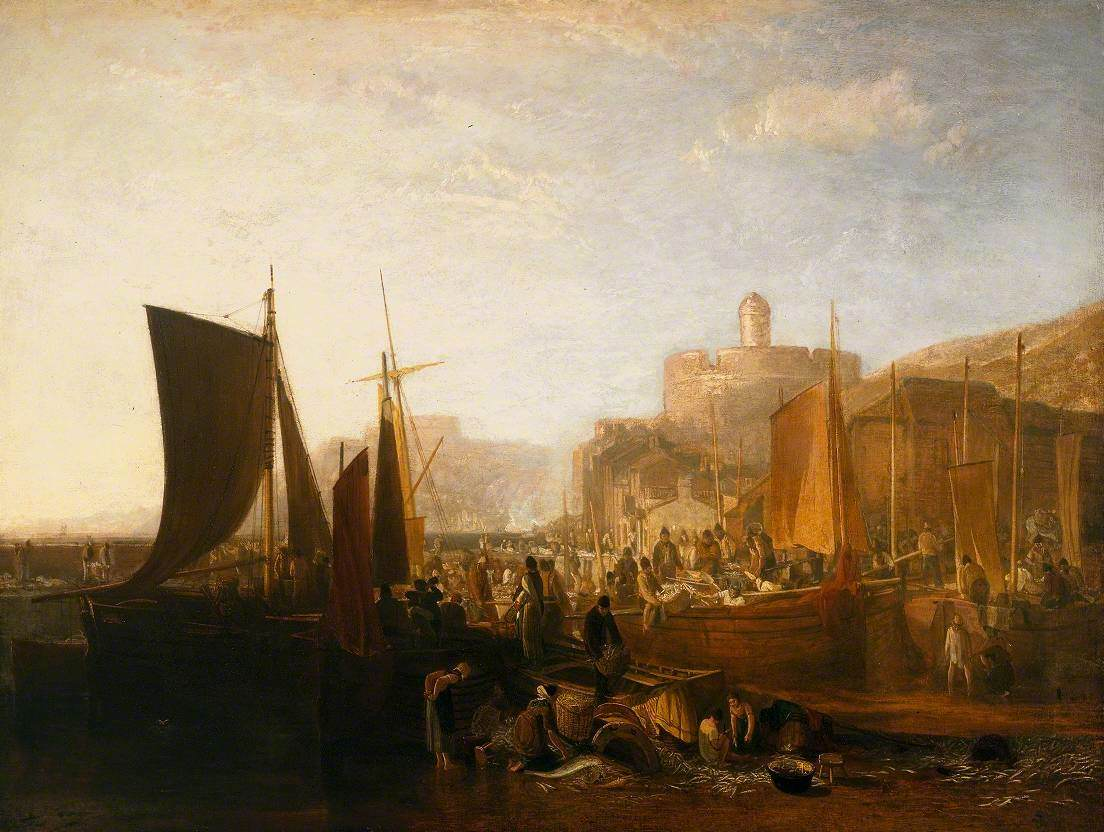
St Mawes at the Pilchard Season by J.M.W. Turner, 1812

The village takes its name from the Celtic saint Saint Maudez (Mawe), who may have come from Ireland but is mainly venerated in Brittany. A name: 'Musidum' in Roman times, has subsequently been applied to St. Mawes, although the source is dubious.

St Mawes was once an important town and was made a borough in 1563, returning two members to parliament. It was disfranchised in 1832. The population in the 1841 census was 941.The town was described, in 1880, by an anonymous writer,

... as a quiet little fishing village, and consists of a long straggling street, fronting the water; it has, however a good pier, which was erected in 1854; and a sea-wall, with a parapet was built not long ago, along the centre front of the town.

St Mawes Castle is a well-preserved coastal fortress from the time of Henry VIII, built to counter the invasion threat from the Continent. Charles Henderson, writing in 1925, says of St Mawes, "an ancient fishing town which in late years has assumed the different and more sophisticated character of a watering place". The seal of St Mawes was Az. a bend lozengy Or between a tower in the sinister chief Arg. and a ship with three masts the sail furled in the dexter base of the second, with the legend "Commune Sigillum Burgi de St. Mawes al Mauditt.

=== Royal family ===
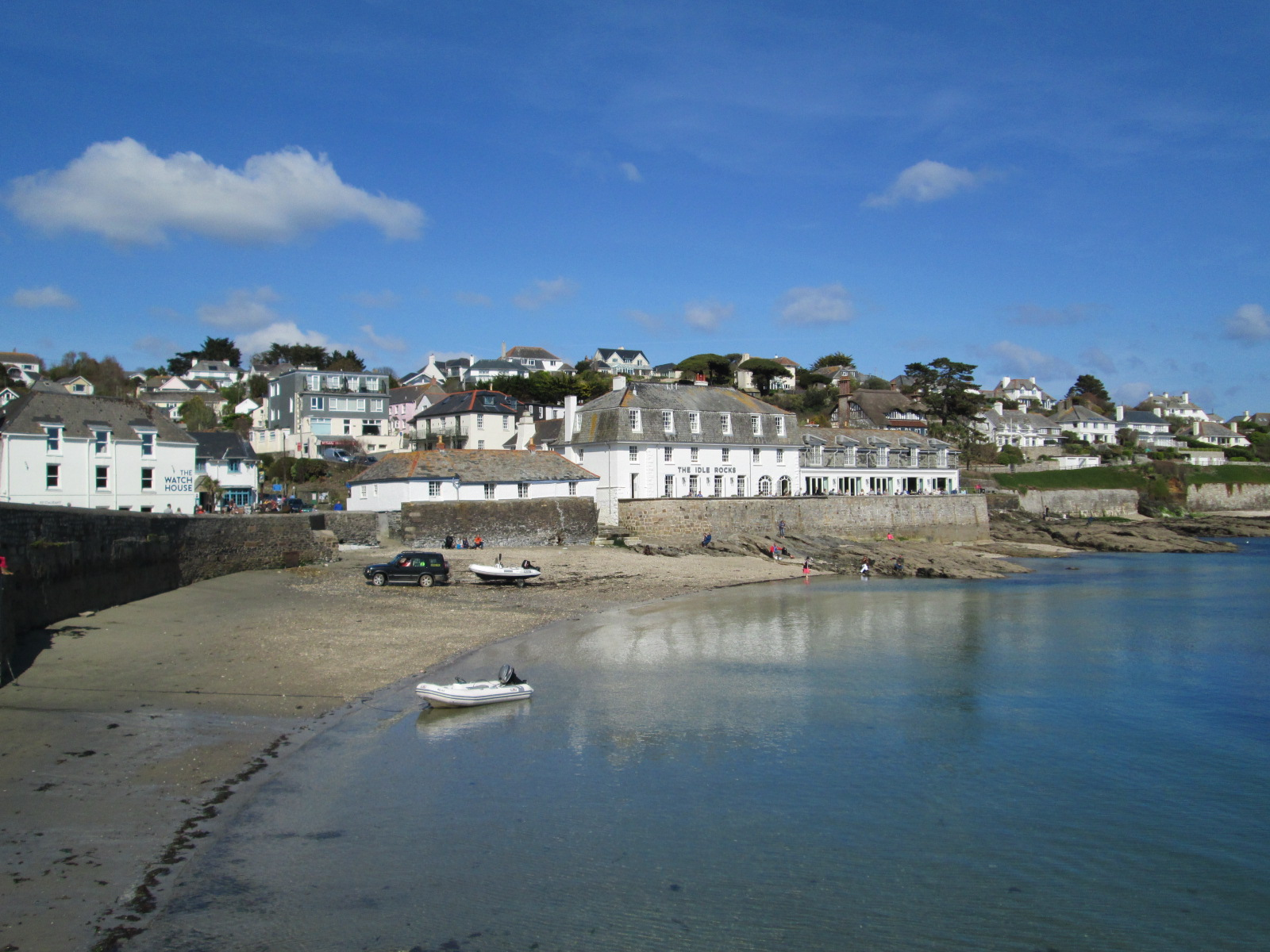
St Mawes harbour

There have been frequent private visits to St Mawes by members of the royal family including Queen Elizabeth The Queen Mother, Princess Margaret and more recently Charles III and Queen Camilla, the then-Duke and Duchess of Cornwall, who ended their stay in July 2008 by naming the new St Mawes ferry The Duchess of Cornwall. The Queen visited St Mawes in 1977 during her Silver Jubilee Tour. In June 2002 for The Queen's Golden Jubilee and, with a brand new cast in June 2012 for the Diamond Jubilee, The Queen's Coronation was re-enacted in great detail by the young people of the village in a ceremony entitled "The Children's Coronation".

== Church history ==
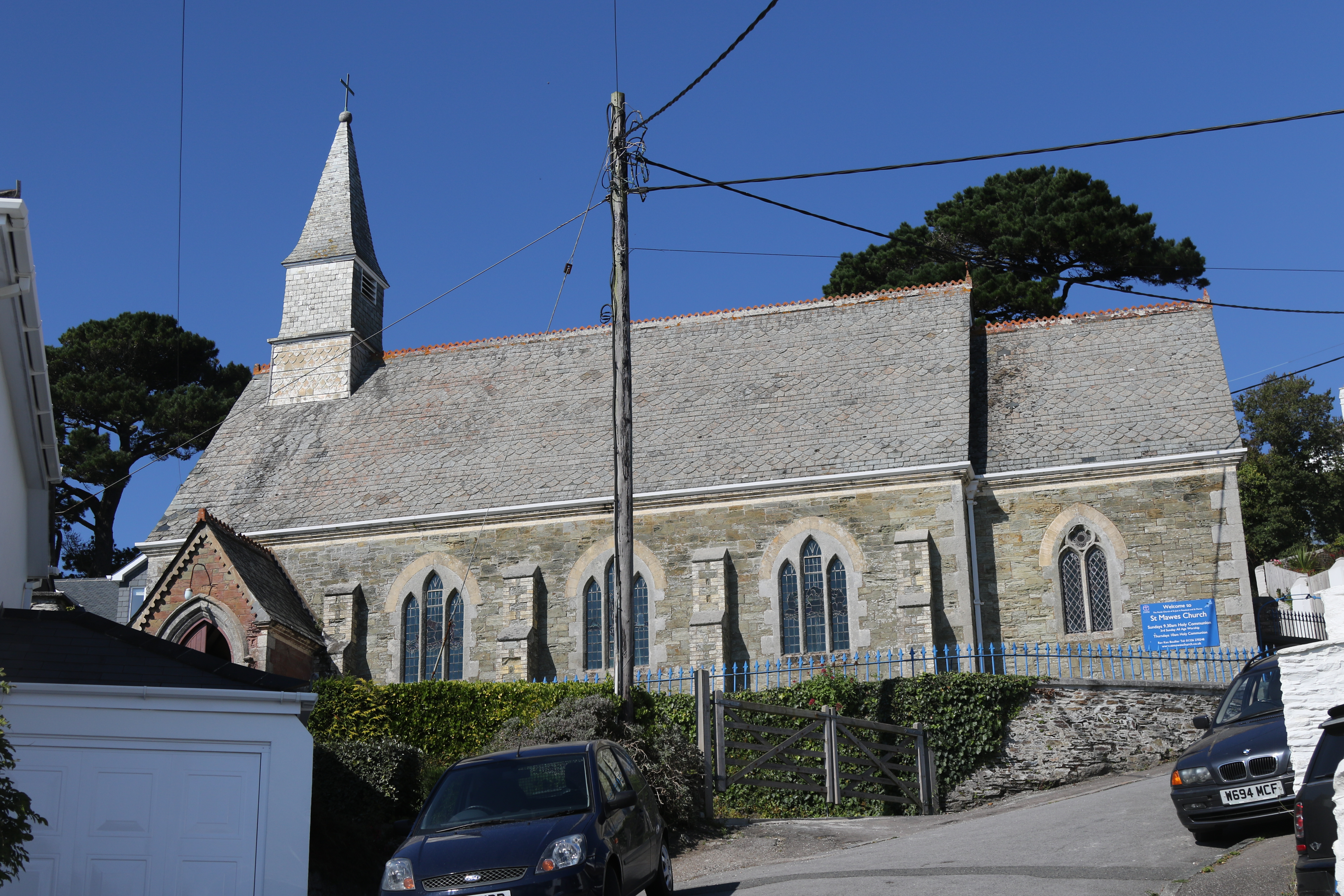
The church of St Mawes

The name of the town comes from Saint Maudez, a Breton saint, and there was a chapel here dedicated to him with his holy well nearby. Its existence in 1427 is mentioned in George Oliver's Monasticon and it remained in use until the reign of Elizabeth I when it was abandoned. From that time until ca 1838 there was no chapel for the townspeople until a private chapel built in 1807 by the Marquis of Buckingham was licensed by the Bishop. This was on a different site and was rebuilt in 1881. St Mawes continued however to be in the parish of St Just in Roseland. St Mawes' Church, St Mawes was opened in 1884. There is also a Methodist church, which was built in the first half of the 19th century and is a Grade II listed building.

== Demographics ==
According to 2011 UK census data, 714 people lived in St Mawes. 91% of residents were born in UK and the most common religion stated was Christian (74.8%).

== Cultural associations ==
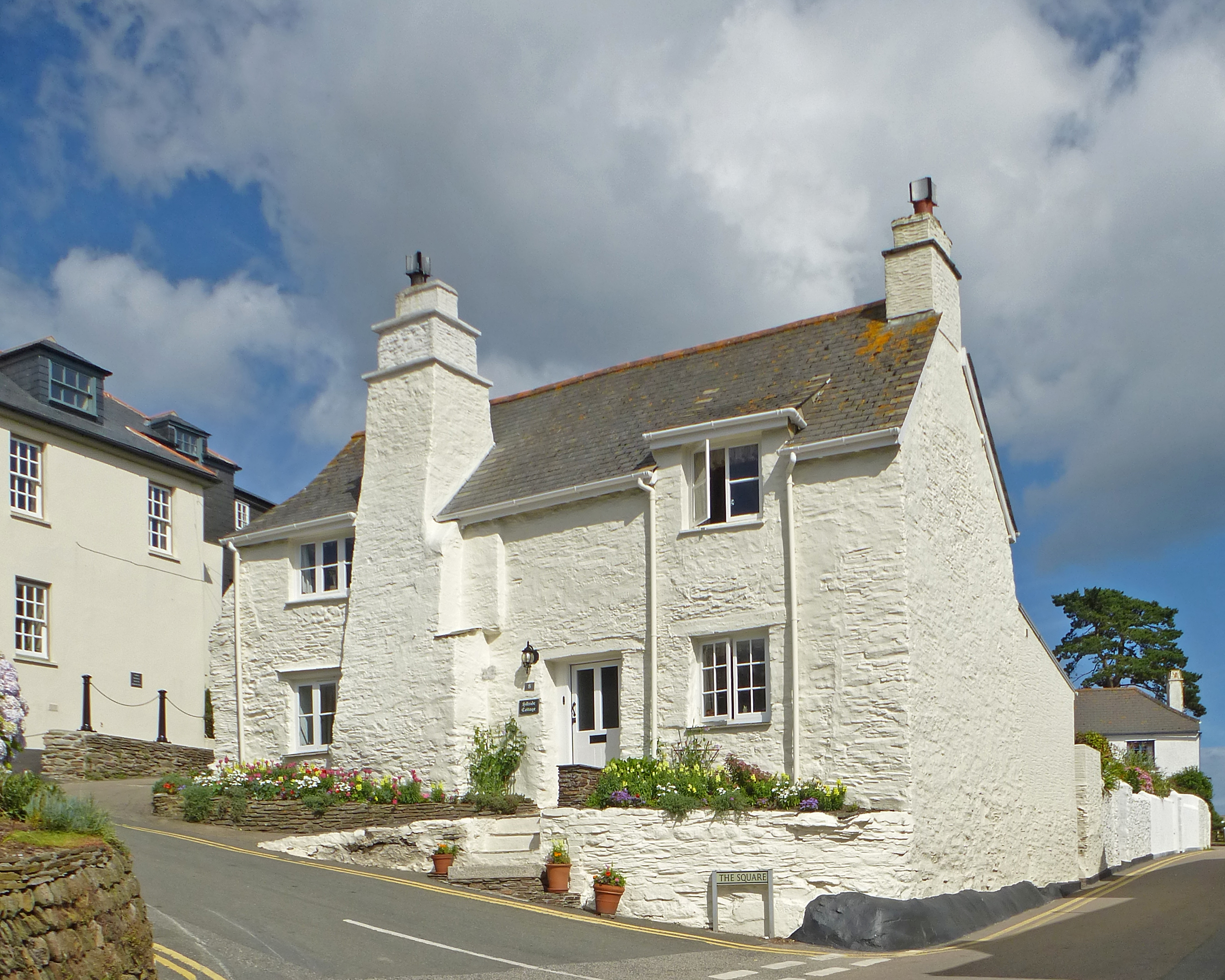
The Square, St Mawes

The 1964 Agatha Christie film Murder Ahoy was filmed here, as was the 1964 film Crooks in Cloisters. Due to popularity as a fishing and sailing destination St Mawes has an active sailing club and is home to the annual St Mawes Fish Festival.

== Transport ==
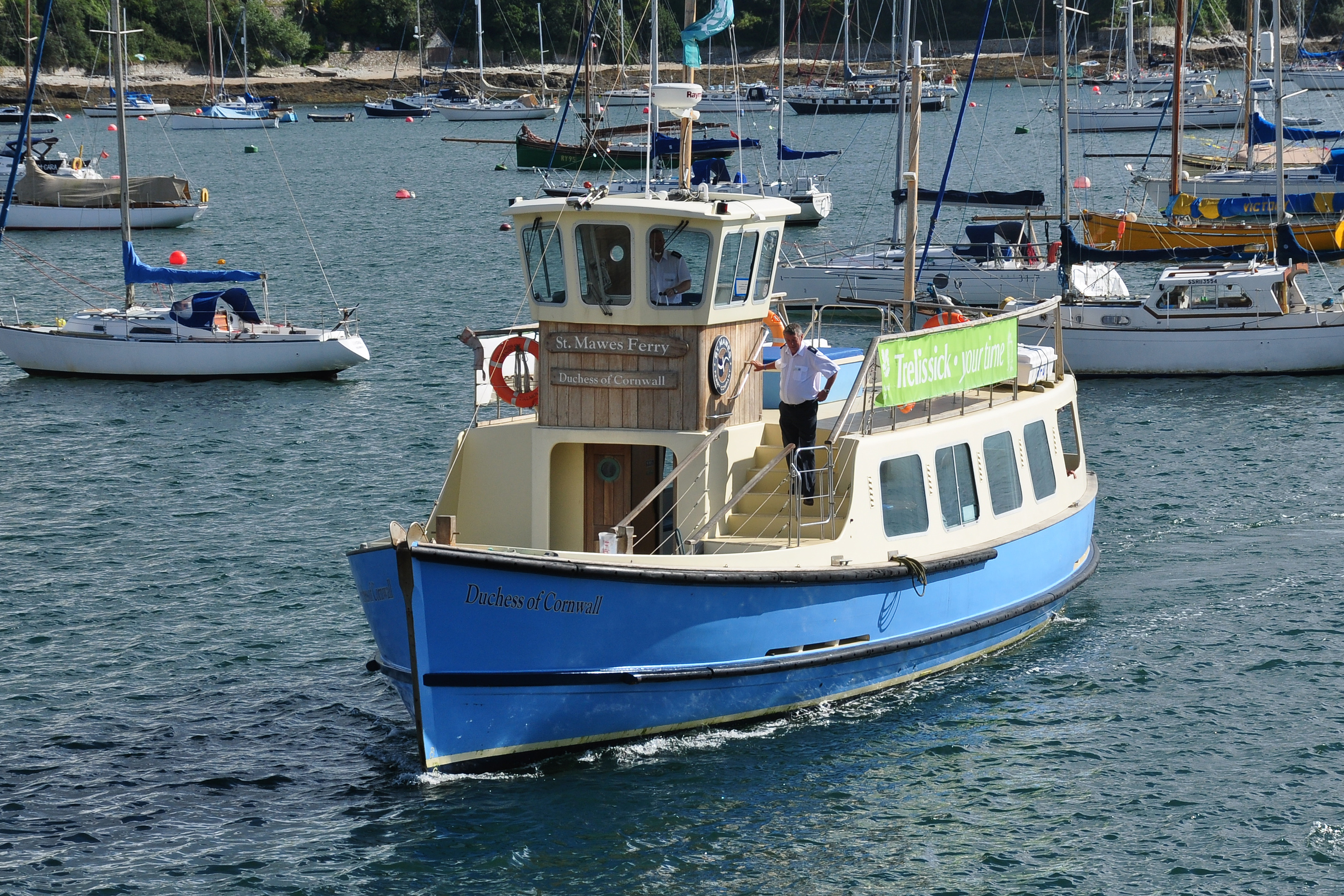
The St Mawes Ferry at Falmouth

A year-round ferry provides a service to Falmouth, which is less than a mile away by boat, but due to its proximity to the Fal estuary it is some 30 miles (48 km) away by road. The Place Ferry links the South West Coast Path and operates from Good Friday to the end of October.

== Notable residents ==
- Barry Bucknell — BBC TV presenter who popularised Do It Yourself (DIY) in the United Kingdom.
- David Richards — former racing driver and owner of Aston Martin
- Frank Williams — founder and team principal of the WilliamsF1 Formula One racing team
- Olga Polizzi — daughter of Lord Forte, sister of Sir Rocco Forte, and mother of The Hotel Inspector presenter Alex Polizzi.
- Lord Shawcross — former Attorney General, and his son William Shawcross, writer

== Bibliography ==
- Maurice Carbonnell, Saint Maudez - Saint Mandé, un maître du monachisme breton, 2009 : ISBN 2-914996-06-3
