= Denver Windmill =

Tower mill in Denver, Norfolk, England

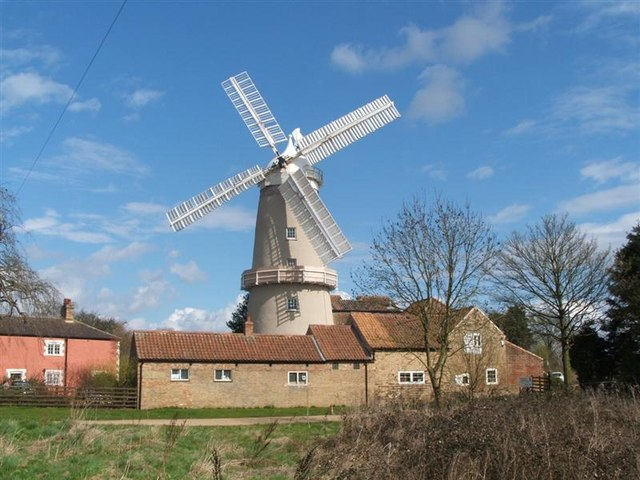
- The restored mill, April 2006
- Interactive map of Denver Windmill

Origin
- Mill name: Denver Mill
- Grid reference: TF 6050 0121
- Coordinates: 52.5850°N 0.3676°E
- Operator: Denver Windmill Ltd
- Year built: 1835

Information
- Purpose: Corn mill
- Type: Tower mill
- Storeys: Six
- No. of sails: Four sails
- Type of sails: Double Patent sails
- Windshaft: Cast iron
- Winding: Fantail
- Fantail blades: Six blades
- Auxiliary power: Steam engine, later replaced by a diesel engine
- No. of pairs of millstones: Three pairs

Denver Windmill is a Grade II* listed tower mill at Denver, Norfolk, England. In March 2010, there were about 374,000 list entries of which 5.5% were Grade II* and even fewer were superior.

== History ==
Denver windmill was built in 1835, replacing an earlier post mill which was marked on the 1824 Ordnance Survey map. The mill was built for John Porter and the tower bears a datestone with the legend JMP 1835. A steam mill had been erected at Denver windmill by 1863, powered by a 12 horsepower (8.9 kW) engine. This drove three pairs of millstones, as did the windmill.

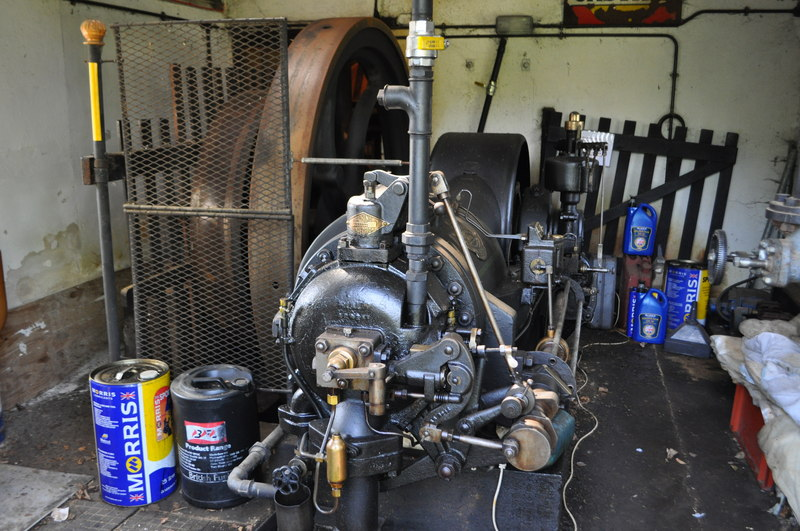
Denver Mill - Blackstone engine

In 1896, James Gleaves made a Deed of Assignment and the mill was offered for sale by auction at the Crown Hotel, Downham Market but was withdrawn from sale at the auction. The mill was later bought by Thomas Harris, who had previously run the post mill at Southery. On 22 February 1908, the mill was damaged in a gale and put out of action. Thomas Harris died in 1925 and left the mill to his son Thomas, who continued to work it by wind and a diesel engine, which had replaced the earlier steam engine. The mill's centenary was celebrated with a supper on 10 January 1936. In December 1937, Thomas Harris was awarded a certificate by the Society for the Protection of Ancient Buildings. The mill was struck by lightning in 1939 and a sail was damaged, but this was repaired. In 1941, the curb was damaged, ending the use of wind power. Milling continued by a Blackstone diesel engine until 1969 when Thomas Harris died. The mill passed to his sister, Edith Staines, who offered the mill to Norfolk County Council on condition that they covered the legal fees. In July 1972, a sail was blown off in a gale, damaging the stage as it fell. The opposite sail was removed leaving the mill with a single pair of sails. The Deed of Gift was signed on 20 August 1973. Restoration work to the cap, gallery, sails and fantail was carried out by millwrights John Lawn and Philip Lennard in the winter of 1974–75.

On 2 January 1976, the cap was lifted during a gale, and damaged the curb and supporting brickwork. The cap was eventually removed for restoration work to be carried out in 1991 and in 1992 further work was carried out on the sails.

In 1995, the Mill and house were put up for sale by Norfolk County Council and purchased by the Norfolk Historic Buildings Trust. Restoration work to restore the mill to full working order was carried out at a cost of over £1,000,000. This was partly funded by grants from the European Regional Development Fund, the Heritage Lottery Fund, Norfolk County Council and the Rural Development Commission and a loan from the Architectural Heritage Fund. The restored mill opened to the public in March 2000.

In 2008 the Abel family took over the operation of the project as Denver Mill Ltd with the objective to make it sustainable, removing the need for further public funding. As the last working Windmill in Norfolk, a return to commercial production along with the development of a range of high quality flours was begun and in the on-site Bakery and Tearoom products are showcased, whilst in a new Bakery Training School the skills of Craft Baking and the understanding of the characteristics of stone ground flour are learnt.

On 4 October 2011, whilst the windmill was freewheeling one of the steel stocks sheared near the canister. It broke on three sides and folded on the bottom before crashing the sail into the one below it and throwing debris throughout the site. At the time of the accident, the mill yard was full of diners and a group of pupils from Clenchwarton Primary School were in the middle of a visit, with some in the Windmill and the others eating their lunch in the Tea Garden. The quick action of Denver Mill staff averted a tragedy by immediately stopping the mill and escorting the children and diners to safety. Thankfully no one was hurt and no damage sustained to anything other than the site, the Mill staff receiving praise from both the school and authorities.

In August 2013, the windmill reopened under new management. The charity which owns the Mill is currently raising funds to repair and re install the sails and the mill complex is once again open to the public.

== Description ==
Denver Windmill is a six-storey tower mill with a stage at third-floor level. The tower is 59 feet (17.98 m) high to the curb. The ogee cap has a gallery and is winded by a fantail. The mill drives three pairs of overdrift millstones. A 1932 Blackstone diesel engine provides auxiliary power.

In 2009 an electrically powered Barron Dreadnought vertical stone mill was brought into commission, with French SAMAP conical stone mill added in 2011. A Blackstone 2' vertical French Burr mill is in the process of being recommissioned, and following the stock accident electrification of one set of stones is being investigated for the Windmill.

== Millers ==
- John Porter 1835-53
- John Gleaves 1853-73
- James Gleaves 1873-96
- Thomas Edward Harris 1896-1925
- Thomas Edwin Harris 1925-69

== Public access ==
Denver Windmill is now a pub called the Steammill and is open to the public, except Christmas Day.

== Culture and media ==
Denver Windmill appeared in an episode of 'Allo 'Allo! titled "Fighting with Windmills" which was filmed in 1992.

The mill and tea room featured in the 2012 BBC2 series Alex Polizzi: The Fixer, which focuses on Alex Polizzi turning around family businesses.
