= James Nesbitt's Ireland =

- Genre: Travel
- Presented by: James Nesbitt
- Country of origin: United Kingdom
- Original language: English
- No. of series: 1
- No. of episodes: 8

Production
- Running time: 30 minutes (inc. adverts)
- Production company: Twofour

Original release
- Network: ITV
- Release: 18 March – 6 May 2013

Related
- Cornwall with Caroline Quentin

James Nesbitt's Ireland is a British travel documentary show that aired on ITV from 18 March to 6 May 2013 and was presented by James Nesbitt.
