= Olga Polizzi =

Hotelier and interior designer

The Honourable Olga Polizzi CBE
- Born: Olga Forte; February 1946 (age 80)
- Occupations: Hotelier; interior designer
- Political party: Conservative
- Spouses: Alessandro Polizzi (m. 1966; died 1980) William Shawcross (m. 1993)
- Children: 2, including Alex Polizzi
- Father: Charles Forte
- Relatives: Rocco Forte (brother); Oliver Peyton (son-in-law)

Olga Polizzi, Lady Shawcross CBE (née Forte; born February 1946) is a British hotelier and interior designer. She is a former Westminster City Council councillor, representing Lancaster Gate ward for the Conservative Party.

== Family ==
Polizzi is the mother of the broadcaster and The Hotel Inspector presenter Alex Polizzi and Charlotte, who is married to Oliver Peyton. Her brother is Sir Rocco Forte, and their father was Charles Forte, Baron Forte. She is married to William Shawcross (m. 1993), following her former marriage to Alessandro Polizzi (m. 1966–1980) until his death.
