= William Shawcross =

British writer, lecturer, and broadcaster (born 1946)

The Honourable Sir William Shawcross CVO

Commissioner for Public Appointments
- Incumbent
- Assumed office 1 October 2021
- Preceded by: Peter Riddell

Chair of the Charity Commission
- In office 1 October 2012 – 23 February 2018
- Prime Minister: David Cameron; Theresa May
- Preceded by: Suzi Leather
- Succeeded by: Tina Stowell, Baroness Stowell of Beeston

Personal details
- Born: William Hartley Hume Shawcross; 28 May 1946 (age 80) Sussex, England
- Spouses: Marina Warner (m. 1971; div. 1980) Michal Levin (m. 1981; div. 1992) Olga Polizzi (m. 1993)
- Children: Conrad Shawcross; Eleanor Shawcross; Alex Polizzi (step-daughter)
- Parents: Hartley Shawcross; Joan Mather
- Relatives: Charles Forte, Baron Forte (father-in-law); Rocco Forte (brother-in-law); Simon Wolfson (son-in-law)
- Education: St Aubyns School; Eton College; University College, Oxford
- Website: www.williamshawcross.org

Sir William Hartley Hume Shawcross CVO (born 28 May 1946) is a British journalist, writer, and broadcaster. He is the incumbent Commissioner for Public Appointments. From 2012 to 2018 he chaired the Charity Commission for England and Wales.

Shawcross has written and lectured on issues of international policy, geopolitics, Southeast Asia and refugees, as well as the British royal family. He has written for several publications, including Time, Newsweek, International Herald Tribune, The Spectator, The Washington Post and Rolling Stone, in addition to writing numerous books on international topics: the Prague Spring, the Vietnam War, the Iranian Revolution, the Iraq War, foreign assistance, humanitarian intervention, and the United Nations. His works Sideshow (1979) and The Quality of Mercy (1984) were among The New York Times Book Review's books of the year.

== Early life and education ==
The eldest of three children, William Shawcross was born on 28 May 1946 in Sussex, to the barrister Hartley Shawcross and his second wife Joan Mather. At the time of his birth, his father was the Labour MP for St Helens, the Attorney General for England and Wales, the first British principal delegate to the United Nations, and the Chief Prosecutor for the United Kingdom at the Nuremberg trials. His mother died in a riding accident on the Sussex Downs in 1974. His father died at the age of 101 in 2003.

Shawcross was educated at St Aubyns Preparatory School in Rottingdean, followed by Eton College, and University College, Oxford, from which he graduated in 1968. After leaving Oxford, he attended Saint Martin's School of Art to study sculpture and became a freelance researcher for The Sunday Times. Unable to obtain a permanent position at the newspaper, he wrote his first book, a biography of the Czechoslovak leader Alexander Dubček, which was published in 1970.

== Career ==
After leaving Oxford, Shawcross worked as a journalist for The Sunday Times, and contributed to a book by its journalists on Watergate. In 1973, as a Congressional Fellow of the American Political Science Association, Shawcross worked in Washington, DC, on the staffs of Senator Edward M. Kennedy and Representative Les Aspin. From 1986 to 1996 Shawcross was Chairman of ARTICLE 19, the international centre on censorship.

From 1997 to 2002, he was a Member of the Council of the Disasters Emergency Committee, and a board member of the International Crisis Group from 1995 to 2005. Shawcross was appointed a member of the UN High Commissioner for Refugees's Informal Advisory Group in 1995, a post he held until 2000. From 1997 to 2003, he was a member of the BBC World Service Advisory Council. In 2008, he became a Patron of the Wiener Library, and in 2011 he joined the board of the Anglo-Israel Association and was appointed to the board of the Henry Jackson Society.

Shawcross was appointed to the chairmanship of the Charity Commission for England and Wales on 1 October 2012, serving two three-year terms until February 2018. His appointment was controversially extended in 2015; a decision that was criticised as "rushed" for "political reasons" by his opponents. A January 2018 assessment of his tenure concluded that he "won praise from government but heavy criticism from within the charity sector."

In March 2019, he was named by the UK Foreign Secretary as Special Representative on UK victims of Qadhafi-sponsored IRA terrorism. In March 2020, he delivered his report to the Foreign Secretary but, controversially, it was not made public.

In January 2021, the British government appointed Shawcross to head the review of its anti-radicalisation programme, Prevent. Amnesty International and 16 other human rights and community organisations announced they would boycott the review in protest at the appointment of William Shawcross as its chairman as they feared a "whitewash" because of his perceived anti-Muslim bias.

Shawcross was appointed the Commissioner for Public Appointments in September 2021. As commissioner, on 24 January 2023 he opened an investigation into the appointment of Richard Sharp to the chairmanship of the BBC amid allegations that the prime minister, Boris Johnson, had recommended Sharp's appointment after Sharp had helped him secure a loan guarantee. Six days after beginning the investigation into Sharp's appointment, Shawcross wrote to Julian Knight, the chair of the Digital, Culture, Media and Sport Committee, to recuse himself from its deliberations, disclosing that he had met Sharp "on previous occasions" which could give the impression of a conflict of interest. Shawcross announced that he would be handing his investigation to an "independent person" to complete while retaining the other regulatory powers of his office.

== Political views ==
Shawcross's politics have been described as having moved to the right throughout his life. His 1979 book on Cambodia, Sideshow: Kissinger, Nixon and the Destruction of Cambodia, resulted in Shawcross's being "lauded by liberal intellectuals and America's East Coast elite." The US left continues to praise Shawcross's earlier work; for example, in September 2019, Sideshow was cited at length in an opinion piece in The Intercept defending Rep. Alexandria Ocasio-Cortez.

As an initial indicator of how his views were shifting, in his 1990 introduction to the revised edition of his 1970 biography of Alexander Dubček, Shawcross wrote:

My own principal criticism [of his own 1970 book] is that I did not realize adequately that the experiment of humane Communism, or Socialism with a Human Face, was impossible, perhaps even a contradiction in terms. . . . The last twenty years have shown nothing so much as the catastrophic nature of Communism everywhere. Wherever Communism has triumphed—I think particularly of Vietnam, Cambodia, and Laos—its consequences have been utterly disastrous.

In 1992, he wrote an "admiring" biography of Rupert Murdoch. In 1994, about his 1970s journalism from Vietnam, in light of subsequent abuses by the governments of Cambodia, Vietnam, and Laos, Shawcross wrote:

I think I concentrated too easily on the corruption and incompetence of the South Vietnamese and their American allies, was too ignorant of the inhuman Hanoi regime, and far too willing to believe that a victory by the Communists would provide a better future.

Following the attacks of 11 September 2001, he supported the US invasion of Iraq.

His 2003 selection by Buckingham Palace to write the authorised biography of the Queen Mother was described as drawing "Shawcross into the bosom of the monarchy in a way rarely enjoyed by any layman", and the resulting book led to him being described as a "royalist writer". The biography was published in 2009, and a collection of letters followed in 2012. He is a pronounced royalist, who is frequently complimentary of the royal family, for example in an April 2020 piece for The Spectator on Queen Elizabeth II, titled "Thank God for the Queen":

One happy result of the horrible virus is that it has prompted the Queen to give us not one but two statements of her faith in this country and God. Together they demonstrate vividly the exquisite, strong but light touch of our almost timeless monarch.

In 2006, Shawcross warned of "a vast fifth column" of Muslims in Europe who "wish to destroy us"; we should not shy away from labelling the problem "Islamic fascism".

In a 2010 article for National Review Shawcross described Britain as a "mere piece of the bland but increasingly oppressive Bambiland of the E.U., promoting such PC global issues as gay rights (except in Muslim lands) and man-made climate change." He also criticised "postmodernism"; defining it as "a disastrous creed that there is no objective truth and that everything is relative" and likened it to a form of appeasement. In the same article, Shawcross described Labour's "'multicultural' ideology" as a "catastrophe" and implied that Labour's immigration policy was designed to "dilute Britishness".

In his 2012 book Justice and the Enemy, Shawcross defended the use of torture and waterboarding at Guantánamo Bay as a natural "response to the most urgent problems" of terrorism.

In November 2018 he appeared to walk back his 1979 criticism of Henry Kissinger in Sideshow; in an argument that Kissinger should be allowed to speak at New York University, Shawcross noted "regret" for the "tone" of his prior criticism of Kissinger, which he minimised as "a policy disagreement over Cambodia", as opposed to "a moral crusade", and he concluded that Kissinger "is an extraordinary man who deserves respect."

In November 2019 he came out in support of Britain's exit from the European Union, on the basis of the EU's problematic nature and approach, writing in The Spectator that "there are risks in proceeding with Brexit. But there are far greater risks in abandoning it."

The change over time in Shawcross's politics has been compared to the political shifts of his father Hartley Shawcross, Paul Johnson, and Christopher Hitchens. While noting speculation about other reasons for the shift, American journalist James Traub speculated that "it's more instructive to consider the possibility that Shawcross has remained true to his principles, but that a morally driven foreign policy looks very different after 9/11 than it did before."

== Selected books ==
=== Dubcek (1970, revised 1990) ===
Shawcross's first published book was a biography of Alexander Dubček, the leader of Czechoslovakia during the 1968 Prague Spring whose "socialism with a human face" briefly brought freedom into the Soviet Bloc. According to the introduction to the 1990 edition, the book's genesis was in Shawcross's travels to Czechoslovakia as a 22-year-old recent college graduate in 1968–69, when he witnessed the Prague Spring and its aftermath. In April 1969, as his first assignment, The Times sent Shawcross to Prague to report on Dubcek's deposition from power, which led him to decide "I would like to write a book about Dubcek", and to spend several months in Czechoslovakia researching it. The book concluded that Dubcek "was quite convinced that he had discovered in 1968 that for which philosophers and philanthropists have for centuries searched—the just society. He may have been right."

The New York Times Book Review, in December 1971, named Dubcek among the year's "noteworthy titles", describing it in a June 1971 capsule review as: "Written less than a year after Alexander Dubcek's resignation, this biography of the Czech leader by a London journalist is an authoritative, first‐rate job."

Shawcross revised and reissued Dubcek in 1990 upon its subject's return to prominence and power during the Velvet Revolution, following two decades of rustication.

=== Crime and Compromise: Janos Kadar and the Politics of Hungary Since Revolution (1974) ===
Shawcross next wrote "a political study of Hungarian politician János Kádár" who, like Dubcek, "tried to negotiate with Communist dogmas to create more humane regimes." In it, Shawcross argued that, following Kádár's 1956 betrayal of Hungarian President Imre Nagy, "Kadar worked to reunite Hungary and succeeded in making it one of the most advanced countries in the Warsaw Pact in both economic and democratic terms."

In his mostly-favourable review in The Washington Post, Robert Dean, a CIA analyst, wrote that "Shawcross has succeeded admirably in conveying a sense of the atmosphere which has come to prevail in the wake of the reform, and how a cautious reformist ethos and economic success have in turn shaped cultural life, social policies, and the attitudes of youth." Dean thought that the book portrayed Kadar less well than it did Hungary: "One senses that Shawcross would have liked to have produced a biography of Kadar but was stymied by the incompleteness of information."

=== Sideshow: Kissinger, Nixon and the Destruction of Cambodia (1979) ===
Sideshow is, at least in the United States, Shawcross's best-known and most controversial book. To write it, Shawcross interviewed over 300 people and reviewed thousands of US Government documents, some classified Top Secret, obtained using the Freedom of Information Act. Sideshow exposed the secret bombing of Cambodia conducted by US President Richard Nixon and his advisor Henry Kissinger, and argued that Nixon's and Kissinger's policy "led to the rise of the Khmer Rouge and the subsequent massacre of a third of Cambodia's population," According to one summary, Sideshow

denounces the systematic destruction of Cambodia by the Nixon administration as a consequence of the Vietnam War and for the sake of a mere strategic design. The study stresses how the decision to attack a neutral country was a patent violation of the American Constitution. As in his previous two books, Shawcross combines an interest in international policies with a private focus on the personal relationship between Nixon and Kissinger. The study argues that the president and his secretary of state reproduced in their international relations the same pattern of falsehood that characterized their association.

The book's penultimate, conclusory sentence — "Cambodia was not a mistake; it was a crime" — is frequently quoted; whenever Shawcross's lifetime of writing is reduced to one sentence, that's it.

Sideshow received high praise and awards. The Pulitzer Prize jury recommended a special citation for it in the 1980 awards based on its "extraordinary qualities", although it was ineligible for the prize because its author was not American; the Pulitzer board declined that recommendation, however. The New York Times Book Review selected Sideshow among its top 17 "Editor's Choice" books of 1979, describing it as an "indictment" of Kissinger and Nixon. It won the George Polk Award in Journalism's Book Award for 1979. Columnist Anthony Lewis wrote in The New York Times,

I think it is the most interesting and the most important book on American foreign policy in many years. On more than foreign policy, really: on the American constitutional system. For it is a textbook — a gripping, factual textbook — on what can happen when the system is violated.

John Leonard of The New York Times wrote that in addition to being "meticulous[ly]" documented, "it has the sweep and the shadow of a spy novel as it portrays the surreal world of power, severed from morality, paranoid, feeding on itself."

Kissinger, who declined Shawcross's interview requests when the book was being written, vociferously denounced Sideshow, as did American conservatives. In an angry letter to The Economist, Kissinger described the book as "obscene" and "absurd." Observing that both Sideshow and Kissinger's memoir, White House Years, were included among The New York Times Book Review's best books of 1979, Herbert Mitgang asked each author about the other's volume. Kissinger called Sideshow "a shoddy, outrageous work that is filled with inaccuracies," adding, "And you can quote me." Following the publication of Sideshow, Peter Rodman, an aide to Kissinger, concluded that Shawcross's work was "a fraud" and "a compendium of errors, sleight of hand, and egregious selectivity", according to R. Emmett Tyrrell Jr., who published Rodman's criticism in his conservative magazine, The American Spectator. Shawcross, in turn, described Rodman's critique as "a rotten piece of work" and wrote a response ("demonstrating the fallacies, if not the fraud, of almost all of Mr. Rodman's points"), which The American Spectator published, with Rodman's further reply. Shawcross included the entire exchange in later editions of Sideshow. Tyrrell proclaimed Sideshow the "worst book of the year" in the Washington Post, as did his magazine. Shawcross later became friends with Tyrrell and Rodman. In 2007, Shawcross and Rodman co-wrote a New York Times op-ed, referring to their past differences over Cambodia but jointly arguing against U.S. withdrawal from Iraq. When Rodman died in 2008, Shawcross was "much saddened", as he later wrote, and sent Tyrrell a note expressing his grief. And in 2011, The American Spectator ceremonially revoked its 1979 "worst book of the year" award, on grounds that subsequently "Shawcross has become increasingly sound" in his views, at a London lunch among Shawcross and Tyrrell.

=== The Quality of Mercy: Cambodia, Holocaust and Modern Conscience (1984) ===
The Quality of Mercy again addresses Cambodia, but as a critical assessment of the aid and relief efforts of governments, UN bodies, and international relief agencies following the suffering inflicted on that country by its Khmer Rouge government and by its neighbour, Vietnam. Shawcross's book portrays, in the words of Colin Campbell's New York Times review, "a humanitarian outpouring that was shot through with misrepresentations, incompetence, callousness and shirking of principle." The book finds positives and negatives of each player, but overall, the United States, in particular the U.S. Embassy in Thailand and its Ambassador, Morton Abramowitz, "comes out looking pretty good. Vietnam appears to have been the main obstacle to the Cambodians' relief."

The Quality of Mercy has received less attention than some of Shawcross's other books, but is highly regarded by some critics, while also receiving negative criticism from others. The historian and Cambodia expert Ben Kiernan, who was "Shawcross's interpreter for several weeks" when he was researching the book, wrote a long critical essay. The Australian journalist John Pilger—who is criticised in The Quality of Mercy, and the two men have a continuing history of public disagreements—reportedly attacked Shawcross in a New Statesman review as a "born-again cold warrior." But Ed Vulliamy, in The Guardian, called it "Shawcross's bravest, most complicated and astute work", commenting that "the little-known Quality of Mercy examined and challenged deficiencies in the international aid programme to Cambodia, which lavished assistance on the remnants of Pol Pot's Khmer Rouge, perpetuating the violence." The editors of The New York Times Book Review included it among their fifteen "Editor's Choice" books, as the best books of 1984. The New York Times concluded, "This is a startling book and most of it is very persuasive." He stated that on most counts, "Mr. Shawcross's subtlety and lack of sanctimony are remarkable." He also considers it "noteworthy that a journalist who in the past attacked American policy so fiercely has, in this book, portrayed at least the United States Embassy in Bangkok as one of the best informed and most decently efficient actors in the refugee drama." Human rights activist Aryeh Neier, reviewing The Quality of Mercy in The New York Times Book Review, similarly stated that "a reader cannot help but be impressed by his apparent fairness" and called it "a splendid book that will have a profound impact." He concluded that The Quality of Mercy "may well be the best account we have of the politics of international charity."

The Quality of Mercy was republished in 1985 with an additional final chapter, "Report from Ethiopia—May 1985", describing relief efforts in response to the Ethiopian famine in light of the Cambodian experience. Shawcross drew several lamentable parallels, for example that "in Ethiopia as well as Cambodia, humanitarian aid was being used by a Communist regime to underwrite war." The essay concluded, "In neither Cambodia nor Ethiopia did the ordinary people for whom the aid was delivered benefit from it to the extent which had been intended and which they deserved. Instead aid was being used to prolong rather than to end the disaster."

=== The Shah's Last Ride (1988) ===
This book's US subtitle was "The Fate of an Ally;" its 1989 UK subtitle was "The Story of the Exile, Misadventures and Death of the Emperor." The Shah's Last Ride is, in the words of its prologue, "the story of a journey, the Shah's forlorn journey into exile and death, and of various elements of his rule—his relations with the British and Americans, his secret police, SAVAK, the CIA, oil, the arms trade. The tale of the fall and exile of the Shah illustrates the nature of the relationship between states and leaders. It is a story of loyalty and convenience." It retraces the odyssey of the last Shah of Iran after being driven into exile by the Iranian Revolution, first to Egypt, and then in succession to Morocco, the Bahamas, Mexico, the United States, Panama, and finally back to Egypt, where he died. Shawcross traces his interest in Iran to the 1960s: "Ardeshir Zahedi, the Shah's Ambassador to London, became a firm friend of my family then, and has remained so since." As a further family connection, Shawcross's father "was once President of the Iran Society in Britain."

Many reviewers praised The Shah's Last Ride for the high quality of its narrative and storytelling, with praise such as "a compelling, evenhanded, artful book, more like a novel than a history;" Much of what criticism the book received arose from its narrow focus. One Middle East expert, Daniel Pipes, wrote that Shawcross "has done his best to eke out the details of this sad, small tale. But this reader concludes that he has pretty much wasted his time, and Shawcross himself seems to know it." Another, Zalmay Khalilzad (later Republican-appointed U.S. Ambassador to, successively, Afghanistan, Iraq, and the United Nations), criticised the book for not highlighting the Carter administration's failures in its dealings with the Shah. A third Middle East expert, Fouad Ajami, criticised Shawcross for telling the Shah's story as a sympathetic (or at least pathetic) tale of "the woes of an ailing, old man, dying of cancer" rather than one of an oppressive dictator and his long, brutal reign. Ajami further criticised Shawcross's choice of sources from the Shah's circle, and his credulous attitude toward them. In a critique that may have foreshadowed Shawcross's later writing about another royal family, Ajami posited that Shawcross's sources, including the Shah's twin sister, Princess Ashraf, were able to work their royal charms to disarm his reportorial skepticism.

=== Murdoch (1992) ===
In a change from international affairs, Shawcross next wrote a biography of Rupert Murdoch. Its 1992 UK title was Rupert Murdoch: Ringmaster of the Information Circus; it was published in the US in 1993 as Murdoch: The Making of a Media Empire. New York Times reviewer Herbert Mitgang commented there was a "red flag" present: Shawcross had let Murdoch read a draft before publication, violating "an unwritten rule for the most esteemed American biographers." The pundit Andrew Sullivan, in The New York Times Book Review, described Murdoch as "what a Murdoch paper would surely call a suck-up."

Despite the issues raised, Mitgang's review was generally positive, while Sullivan wrote that Shawcross, albeit "unwittingly", "achieved something very valuable", in "expos[ing] the banality of a highly sophisticated and successful businessman", and "plac[ing] the real issue behind the story of Mr. Murdoch's career—the nature of a democratic culture—away from the petty demonization of an entrepreneur and on the larger forces that have determined his fate." The Economist made a similar point in a more straightforward way: "Although this is a fine, superbly-researched and vivid book on the Murdoch enigma, the enigma remains."

The 1992 publication of Murdoch raised a brief flurry in the literary world. The New Yorker, then edited by Tina Brown, published a short Talk of the Town piece by Francis Wheen, wondering how "could Willie Shawcross, who made his name in the seventies with Sideshow, an indignant expose of Henry Kissinger's destruction of Cambodia, become Murdoch's hagiographer?" David Cornwell, better known by his nom de plume John le Carré, wrote a responsive letter in defence of Shawcross, calling Wheen's essay "one of the ugliest pieces of partisan journalism that I have witnessed in a long life of writing." When Brown said she would only publish Cornwell's letter if he cut it to one paragraph, he released it to the press instead, and the contretemps drew much media attention.

=== Deliver Us From Evil: Peacekeepers, Warlords, and a World of Endless Conflict (2000) ===
Deliver Us From Evil overviews the work of the United Nations during the 1990s to ameliorate situations in many of the world's trouble spots of that decade, largely as seen through the eyes of Kofi Annan, whom Shawcross accompanied on his travels.

Reviews were mixed to negative. Some meted out limited praise: "highly readable, if at times repetitive and scattershot," "admirably fair in his judgments," and "thoughtful but inconclusive" as well as "a useful reality check for all those well-meaning people who clamor for the United Nations to do something."

At the most negative end of the spectrum, a capsule review in The New Yorker concluded: "Shawcross's reporting here is often secondhand; his prose is dreary; and his thinking (which frequently takes refuge in anti-Americanism) is lazy. The result is an insult to the gravity of the issues he purports to address, and—worse—to the anguish of the world's politically endangered peoples." Shawcross's optimistic attitude "as a booster for the UN" was criticised as unwarranted by reviewers from left and right, with all arguing the UN has a long record of failures. His identifying Cambodia as a UN success story drew particular quibbles, while several found fault with the book's analytical conclusions (or, more precisely, its lack thereof).

Robert Kagan, reviewing it for Commentary, labelled Deliver Us From Evil "little more than an exercise in liberal handwringing."

New Zealand diplomat Terence O'Brien said it was excellent first-hand history which "is unlikely soon to be bettered", terming his book sharp and comprehensive. "Shawcross enjoys a reputation as a chronicler of the blemishes in modern international behaviour ... The response of the so-called international community to the continuing rash of internal conflict is subjected to clinical appraisal".

=== Allies (2003) ===
Like other Shawcross books, Allies was published under two different subtitles, in a 2003 hardback as "The U.S., Britain, and Europe in the Aftermath of the Iraq War", and in a 2005 paperback as "Why the West Had to Remove Saddam." The book has been described as a polemic, rather than a work of journalism, with some commentators observing that, unlike other books by Shawcross, it has no footnotes. One critic wrote of Shawcross as "a vocal supporter of President George W. Bush's war on terror and praises Tony Blair's interventionist policies in Iraq and Afghanistan, writing off criticism of the two leaders as hysterical."

Regarding Shawcross's position in Allies compared to his prior positions, especially in Sideshow, the reviewer in The New York Times asked "What's going on here?" while the conservative U.S. journals National Review and The American Spectator were surprised and laudatory. The National Review wrote, "Shawcross has written an outstanding justification of the Anglo-American effort to drive Saddam Hussein from power. It is an exemplary piece of moral clarity and fine writing."

=== Justice and the Enemy: Nuremberg, 9/11, and the Trial of Khalid Sheikh Mohammed (2011) ===
Justice and the Enemy considered the George W. Bush administration's post-9/11 military commissions in light of the Nuremberg trials. In it, according to the law professor and former U.S. Justice Department official Jack Goldsmith, Shawcross "provides a deeply sympathetic account of how" the Bush administration resolved "difficult choices and trade-offs in deciding how to bring justice to the perpetrators of 9/11."

The Economist's review of Justice and the Enemy found the book lacked "original research on al-Qaeda", its Nuremberg comparisons unhelpful, and its author "keener to score points against all those who roundly condemn President George Bush's strategy" than to draw useful conclusions. The Independent described it as a "shameless justification of the policies of the Bush administration" in which "justice is a surreal concept totally subordinate to the "security" of the US".

== Private life and honours ==
In 1970, he married the writer and art critic Marina Warner; their son, born in 1977, Conrad, is an artist. The marriage ended in divorce in 1980.

Shawcross married Michal Levin in 1981. Their daughter, Eleanor, is a political advisor, who worked as director of the Number 10 Policy Unit under Rishi Sunak from 2022 to 2024 afterwards being made a conservative Peer, and is married to Simon, The Lord Wolfson another Conservative life peer.

Shawcross married his third wife, Olga Polizzi, in 1993. They live in a Grade I listed Elizabethan mansion called Friston Place, at East Dean, in East Sussex. Alex Polizzi, the hotelier and television presenter is his stepdaughter.

Shawcross was appointed Commander of the Royal Victorian Order (CVO) in the 2011 New Year Honours and knighted in the 2023 Birthday Honours for public service.

He has lifelong ties to Cornwall where he is a keen campaigner in the preservation and protection of local Conservation Areas. His campaign succeeded in obtaining Grade II listing for St Mawes's historic and endangered sea wall.

In 2009, Shawcross signed a petition in support of film director Roman Polanski, calling for his release after Polanski was arrested in Switzerland in relation to his 1977 sexual abuse case

== Publications ==
- Shawcross, William (1990) [1970]. Dubcek (Revised ed.). New York: Simon & Schuster. ISBN 0-671-72871-7. OCLC 22308589.
- Watergate: The Full Inside Story (co-author, 1973)
- Crime and Compromise: Janos Kadar and the Politics of Hungary since Revolution (1974)
- Sideshow: Kissinger, Nixon and the Destruction of Cambodia (1979), New York Times Editor's Choice Book of the Year, awarded a George Polk Award
- The Quality of Mercy: Cambodia, Holocaust and Modern Conscience (1984), New York Times Editor's Choice Book of the Year, awarded the Freedom From Hunger Media Award
- Shawcross, William (1988). The Shah's last ride: the fate of an ally. New York: Simon and Schuster. ISBN 0-671-55231-7. OCLC 17918074.
- Shawcross, William (1989). Kowtow!. London: Chatto & Windus. ISBN 0-7011-3628-6. OCLC 21336335.
- Shawcross, William (1997) [1992]. Murdoch: the making of a media empire (Rev. & updated ed.). New York: Simon & Schuster. ISBN 0-684-83015-9. OCLC 37192707. (also published as Rupert Murdoch: Ringmaster of the Information Circus) (1992)
- Shawcross, William (1994). Cambodia's new deal: a report. Washington, D.C.: Carnegie Endowment for International Peace. ISBN 0-87003-051-5. OCLC 30359285.
- Shawcross, William (2000). Deliver us from evil: peacekeepers, warlords, and a world of endless conflict. New York: Simon & Schuster. ISBN 0-684-83233-X. OCLC 42911763.
- Shawcross, William (2002). Queen and country. Toronto: M&S. ISBN 0-7710-8056-5. OCLC 48494129.
- Queen and Country: The Fifty-Year Reign of Elizabeth II (2002)
- Shawcross, William (2004). Allies: the U.S., Britain, Europe, and the war in Iraq (1st ed.). New York: PublicAffairs. ISBN 1-58648-216-5. OCLC 53442992.
- Shawcross, William (2009). Queen Elizabeth, the Queen Mother: the official biography. London: Macmillan. ISBN 978-1-4050-4859-0. OCLC 373481915.
- Shawcross, William (2011). Justice and the enemy: Nuremberg, 9/11, and the trial of Khalid Sheikh Mohammed (1st ed.). New York: PublicAffairs. ISBN 978-1-58648-975-5. OCLC 676727040.
- Counting One's Blessings: The Selected Letters of Queen Elizabeth the Queen Mother (2012) (editor)
- The Servant Queen and the King She Serves (2016)

Non-profit organization positions
Preceded by Suzi Leather	Chair of the Charity Commission; 2012–2018	Succeeded by Tina Stowell, Baroness Stowell of Beeston
