= Cornwall with Caroline Quentin =

- Directed by: Chris Williams
- Starring: Caroline Quentin
- Country of origin: United Kingdom
- Original language: English
- No. of series: 2
- No. of episodes: 18

Production
- Executive producer: Dan Adamson
- Production locations: Cornwall, United Kingdom
- Running time: 30 minutes
- Production company: Twofour

Original release
- Network: ITV
- Release: 2 January 2012 – 11 March 2013

Related
- James Nesbitt's Ireland

Cornwall with Caroline Quentin is a British documentary series about Cornwall, presented by Caroline Quentin. The first series comprised 8 episodes and was broadcast on ITV from 2 January to 20 February 2012. The second series comprised 10 episodes and was broadcast from 7 January to 11 March 2013. Episodes are shown on Monday evenings at 8pm.

== Transmissions ==
Series	Start date	End date	Episodes
1	2 January 2012	20 February 2012	8
2	7 January 2013	11 March 2013	10

== Episode list ==
=== Series 1 ===
Episode	Broadcast Date	Ratings	ITV Weekly Rank
1	2 January 2012	3.72m	30
2	9 January 2012	3.61m	27
3	16 January 2012	3.39m	26
4	23 January 2012	3.74m	24
5	30 January 2012	3.35m	28
6	6 February 2012	3.65m	23
7	13 February 2012	3.64m	23
8	20 February 2012	3.37m	27

=== Series 2 ===
Episode	Broadcast Date	Ratings	ITV Weekly Rank
1	7 January 2013	Under 3.42m	Outside top 30
2	14 January 2013	Under 3.42m	Outside top 30
3	21 January 2013	Under 3.42m	Outside top 30
4	28 January 2013	Under 3.25m	Outside top 30
5	4 February 2013	Under 3.24m	Outside top 30
6	11 February 2013	Under 3.09m	Outside top 30
7	18 February 2013	Under 3.31m	Outside top 30
8	25 February 2013	Under 2.96m	Outside top 30
9	4 March 2013	Under 3.01m	Outside top 30
10	11 March 2013	2.94m	30
