= Alex Polizzi: Chefs on Trial =

- Genre: Business
- Presented by: Alex Polizzi
- Country of origin: United Kingdom
- Original language: English
- No. of series: 1

Production
- Running time: 60 minutes
- Production company: Twofour

Original release
- Network: BBC Two
- Release: 20 April – 19 June 2015

Alex Polizzi: Chefs on Trial is a business documentary show produced by TwoFour productions that first aired on BBC Two on the 20 April 2015 and is presented by Alex Polizzi. The programme sees Polizzi help various restaurants to help them find a new head chef who are in desperate need of filling the vacancy.

== Episodes ==
=== Series 1 (2015) ===
Episode	Business	Air date	Synopsis
1	The Gilpin Country House and Restaurant	20 April 2015	Polizzi assists the Gilpin in finding a new head chef.
2	The Gilpin Country House and Restaurant	21 April 2015	Polizzi assists the Gilpin in finding a new head chef.
3	The Gilpin Country House and Restaurant	22 April 2015	Polizzi assists the Gilpin in finding a new head chef.
4	The Gilpin Country House and Restaurant	23 April 2015	Polizzi assists the Gilpin in finding a new head chef.
5	The Miners Arms Gastro Pub	27 April 2015	Alex aids the Miners Arms in not only finding a head chef, but also renovating the building and focusing the business.
6	The Miners Arms Gastro Pub	28 April 2015	Alex aids the Miners Arms in not only finding a head chef, but also renovating the building and focusing the business.
7	The Miners Arms Gastro Pub	29 April 2015	Alex aids the Miners Arms in not only finding a head chef, but also renovating the building and focusing the business.
8	The Miners Arms Gastro Pub	30 April 2015	Alex aids the Miners Arms in not only finding a head chef, but also renovating the building and focusing the business.
9	Amélies Porthleven	16 June 2015	Alex assists owner Sam Sheffield-Dunstan in recruiting a new head Chef for Amélies in the picturesque town of Porthleven, Cornwall.
10	Amélies Porthleven	17 June 2015	Alex assists owner Sam Sheffield-Dunstan in recruiting a new head Chef for Amélies in the picturesque town of Porthleven, Cornwall.
11	Amélies Porthleven	18 June 2015	Alex assists owner Sam Sheffield-Dunstan in recruiting a new head Chef for Amélies in the picturesque town of Porthleven, Cornwall.
12	Amélies Porthleven	19 June 2015	Alex assists owner Sam Sheffield-Dunstan in recruiting a new head Chef for Amélies in the picturesque town of Porthleven, Cornwall.

== Production credits ==
- Presenter: Alex Polizzi
- Series Producer: Maria Knowles
- Producer: Greg Goff
- Director: Robin Leach
- Director: Stuart Derrick
- Executive Producer: Dan Adamson
- Executive Producer: Rachels Innes-Lumsden

== Broadcast ==
Internationally, the series premiered in Australia on 16 November 2015 on LifeStyle Food.
