= A Night with My Ex =

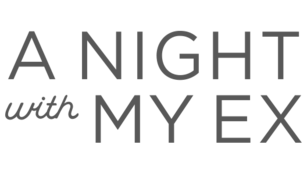
- Genre: Reality
- Country of origin: United States
- Original language: English
- No. of seasons: 1
- No. of episodes: 10

Production
- Executive producers: Melanie Leach; Andrew Mackenzie; Bernie Schaeffer; David Eilenberg; Derek W. Wan
- Running time: 23 minutes
- Production company: Twofour America

Original release
- Network: Bravo
- Release: July 18 – September 19, 2017

A Night with My Ex is an American reality television series that premiered on July 18, 2017, on Bravo. Announced in April, the ten-part show features ex-couples that reunite for one night to discuss their relationship and "hash out their unresolved issues".

== Episodes ==
No.	Title	Original release date
1	"Are You Still a Virgin?"	July 18, 2017
2	"Three's a Crowd"	July 25, 2017
3	"Baby Bump"	August 1, 2017
4	"War of Roses"	August 8, 2017
5	"Makeup Sex"	August 15, 2017
6	"Don't Do it, Honey!"	August 22, 2017
7	"Once a Cheater, Always a Cheater"	August 29, 2017
8	"Three Times a Charm"	September 5, 2017
9	"The Rules of Sexting"	September 12, 2017
10	"The Exes"	September 19, 2017
