= Forte Group =

British hotel and restaurant company

Forte Group plc
- Type: Public
- Industry: Hotels; Catering
- Predecessor: Slaters and Bodega
- Founded: 1935
- Founder: Charles Forte
- Defunct: 2001
- Fate: Acquired
- Successor: Granada
- Headquarters: London, UK
- Key people: Rocco Forte (Chief executive officer)

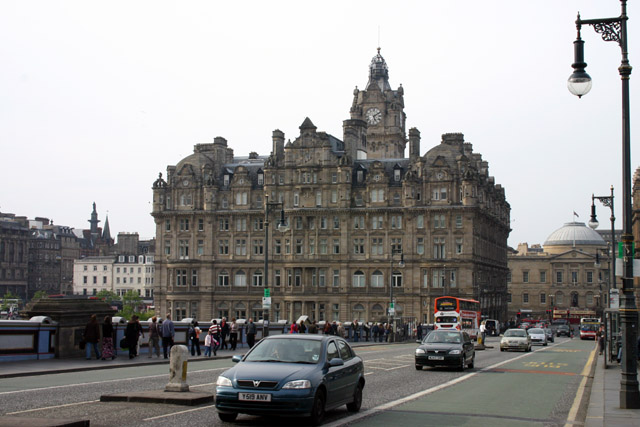
The Balmoral Hotel Situated at the southern end of Edinburgh's North Bridge on the junction with Princes Street. The Balmoral Hotel is now part of the Rocco Forte Hotel Group.

Forte Group plc was a British hotel and restaurant company. It was listed on the London Stock Exchange and was a constituent of the FTSE 100 Index until it was acquired by Granada in 1996. Its head office was in the London Borough of Camden.

== History ==
Charles Forte (26 November 1908 – 28 February 2007) was a British/Italian caterer and hotelier who founded the leisure and hotels conglomerate that ultimately became Forte Group. Charles Forte, funded by his two business partners, Eric Hartwell and Sidney Hartwell, set up his first "milk bar" on Regent Street in London in 1935 as Strand Milk Bar Ltd when he was 26.

Soon he began expanding into catering and hotel businesses. After the Second World War, his company became Forte Holdings Ltd, and bought The Café Royal in 1954. Forte was a major caterer at the Festival of Britain sites in 1951 and also operated the restaurants and bars at London Airport, later known as London Heathrow airport. Forte opened the first full motorway service station for cars at Newport Pagnell in 1960. Forte expanded into the confectionery business, first by purchasing Fullers, based in Hammersmith, before purchasing the larger Terry's of York in 1963. Trust Houses Group Ltd (previously Trust Houses Ltd) and Forte Holdings merged in 1970 to become Trust Houses Forte or THF. The name was simplified to Trusthouse Forte in 1979.

Through mergers and expansion, the Forte Group expanded into a multibillion-pound business. As well as The Café Royal, it also owned the Grosvenor House Hotel, Quaglino's and Talk of the Town in London. It also included the Little Chef roadside restaurants, Forte Grand, Travelodge, Posthouse and Crest hotels, Harvester restaurants, contract catering firm Gardner Merchant, the Summerland leisure complex on the Isle of Man, the wine merchant Grierson-Blumenthal, sporting goods retailer Lillywhites (which adjoined the group's Criterion Restaurant) and a majority (although non-controlling) stake in the Savoy Hotel. Internationally, it owned the Hotel George V, Plaza Athénée and Hotel de la Tremoille in Paris and the Bermudiana in Bermuda. Happy Eater and the five Welcome Break service areas were bought from Hanson Trust on 1 August 1986. The group for a time started to resemble a conglomerate with interests spanning the Sidgwick & Jackson publishing house, the Terry's chocolate company, Puritan Maid and a stake in Thomas Cook travel agents.

Charles Forte was the CEO from 1971 and chairman upon the retirement of Eric Hartwell from 1983 (when his son Rocco Forte took over as CEO).

In the early 1990s, the company was rebranded as Forte and the crown logo was adopted at the same time. This rebranding also heralded the introduction of sub brand groups for almost all the hotels (Posthouse, Crest, Heritage, Grand etc.). Lord Forte passed full control to Rocco in 1993. In 1994, the company purchased the Le Méridien hotel chain. Soon after Rocco took over, the Forte Group was faced with a hostile takeover bid from Granada. Ultimately, Granada succeeded with a £3.9 billion tender offer in January 1996, which left the family with around £350 million in cash.

In 2001, following the de-merger of Compass plc from Granada's media interests, the use of the Forte trademark was returned to Sir Rocco Forte in a gesture intended to dispel the bitter legacy of the takeover. Rocco now owns the Rocco Forte Hotels group.

== Operations ==
Most of the hotels used the following brands:

=== Travelodge ===
The Forte group acquired this US budget hotel brand and rolled it out in the UK. The hotels were originally sited alongside the group's Little Chef roadside cafes. Travelodge used navy blue branding. The office building which was the former Forte Group corporate headquarters at 166 High Holborn, London, has, many years after the Forte Group was taken over and broken up, been turned into a Travelodge (the chain having expanded to comprise a much larger number of urban hotels).

=== Forte Posthouse ===
Hotels were mostly three-star hotels for business travellers. They were usually located in city centres or near major trunk roads. Some of these were sold to Holiday Inn. These hotels used red branding.

=== Forte Heritage ===
Hotels ranged from smaller country house style hotels, e.g., The Old England Hotel in Windermere, the Berystede in Ascot and Leeming House in Ullswater, to former coaching inns such as the Burford Bridge Hotel at Box Hill, the Swan at Lavenham and the Bull at Long Melford. In addition, the brand included some larger resort type hotels such as the Grand Atlantic at Weston Super Mare, the Marine Hotel at North Berwick and the Imperial Hotel, Exmouth; and some smaller resort hotels such as the Dart Marina Hotel in Dartmouth and the Brudenell Hotel in Aldeburgh. Some of these were sold to Macdonald Hotels, others are now operated by Mercure Hotels, others are owned by small groups or independently. These hotels used dark green branding.

=== Forte Crest ===
Hotels were more upmarket business hotels than Forte Posthouse. They were mostly located in cities and were mostly four-star. The naming convention was Forte Crest and the name of the city or locality, e.g. Forte Crest Sheffield or Forte Crest Gatwick Airport. Perhaps the most high-profile hotel was the huge Forte Crest Heathrow, now a Holiday Inn.

=== Forte Grand ===
Hotels were a collection of high-end international hotels including the Waldorf Hotel, Westbury Hotel and Hotel Russell in London, the Balmoral Hotel (formerly "The North British Hotel") in Edinburgh, the Bath Spa Hotel in Bath, Leeming House in Ullswater, the Randolph Hotel in Oxford, The Majestic Hotel in Harrogate, the Compleat Angler in Marlow, the Rusacks Hotel in St Andrews and the Imperial Hotel at Torquay.

There were also a number of hotels which used Forte Grand as their sole name, for example the Forte Grand, Abu Dhabi hotel. Following the acquisition of Le Méridien, the Forte Grand brand was dramatically cut back, with the urban hotels being transferred to the Le Méridien brand, and all the regional UK Forte Grand hotels being demoted to the Forte Heritage brand. The Balmoral Hotel was the first hotel reacquired by Rocco Forte following the takeover and after an extensive refurbishment it forms part of The Rocco Forte Collection. Forte Grand hotels used bronze signage, with general branding in dark red/burgundy.

=== Le Méridien ===
This international hotel chain was acquired from Air France in 1994 and would from then on form the cornerstone of the Group's international mid/upper market offering. These hotels used grey branding.

=== Exclusive ===
The top tier of hotels were discreetly branded Exclusive Hotels by Forte, and included some of the world's most venerable 5 star hotels, for example, the Hôtel George-V, Plaza Athénée and Hotel de la Tremoille in Paris; Brown's Hotel, Grosvenor House and the Hyde Park Hotel in London; the Ritz in Madrid; the Westbury and Plaza Athénée in New York; Hotel des Bergues in Geneva; Hotel Eden in Rome; Sandy Lane Hotel in Barbados etc. The Savoy Group would have added to this collection and augmented its prestige, had overall control been secured, as the Forte Exclusive hotels suffered somewhat in terms of prestige by association with the rest of the group's hotels. At the time of the Granada takeover the Exclusive Hotels brand contained 21 hotels.

Granada failed to find buyers for the hotels as a group and it took a significant time for them to divest itself of these hotels to numerous different owners/operators. Some examples of the current owners/operators include Mandarin Oriental which has the Hyde Park Hotel, in London and Hotel Ritz, in Madrid; Four Seasons Hotels and Resorts which has Hotel des Bergues, in Geneva and Hôtel George-V, in Paris; Marriott International which has the Grosvenor House hotel, managed under its JW Marriott brand, in London; and, notably, Rocco Forte Hotels which has Brown's Hotel in London.

=== London hotels ===
From the first move from catering into hotels (the purchase of The Waldorf), the group had a foothold in the London hotel market, which it significantly expanded over the years. On adoption of sub brands, some of the London hotels were moved to sub brands, others were not. For example, the Hotel Russell, Westbury Hotel and the Waldorf Hotel became Forte Grand. The top tier of London hotels were already part of the Exclusive group which had existed long before the early 90s reorganisation/rebranding. London also had Posthouse and Crest hotels. However, there remained a number of London hotels which were not part of sub brands and these were banded together under the umbrella London Hotels. These included the Cumberland Hotel, the Regent Palace and the Strand Palace (all acquired from the J. Lyons and Co hotels subsidiary in the late 1960s and early 1970s) and they were joined by most of the London Forte Grand hotels when the Forte Grand brand was terminated, although The Cavendish was an exception as it joined the Crest brand.

=== Viscount Hotel ===
In the 1980s, Forte owned the Viscount Hotels brand in the United States.
