= Charles Forte, Baron Forte =

British-Italian hotelier (1908–2007)

The Right Honourable The Lord Forte Kt
- Born: Carmine Forte; 26 November 1908; Mortale, Kingdom of Italy
- Died: 28 February 2007 (aged 98); London, England
- Citizenship: British
- Occupations: Caterer; hotelier
- Known for: Forte Group
- Spouse: Irene Mary Chierico
- Children: 6, including Rocco Forte and Olga Polizzi

Member of the House of Lords
- Lord Temporal
- Life peerage 2 February 1982 – 28 February 2007

Charles Carmine Forte, Baron Forte Kt /ˈfɔːrteɪ/ (26 November 1908 – 28 February 2007) was an Italian-born Scottish hotelier who founded the leisure and hotels conglomerate that ultimately became the Forte Group.

== Early life ==
Charles Forte was born as Carmine Forte in Mortale, now Monforte, Casalattico, in the province of Frosinone, Italy on 26 November 1908, eldest son of Rocco Giovanni Forte and Maria Luigia, daughter of Michelangelo Antonio Forte. His parents were distantly related. He emigrated from Italy to Scotland at the age of four with his family.

He attended Alloa Academy and then St. Joseph's College, Dumfries, as a boarder, followed by two years of studies in Rome.

== Early career ==
After Rome, Forte rejoined his family, who had moved to Weston-super-Mare, where his father ran a café with two cousins. Charles' main training at the age of 21 came in Brighton, where he managed the Venetian.

At 26, he set up his first "milk bar" in 1935, the Strand Milk Bar Ltd. Soon he began expanding into catering and hotel businesses. At the outbreak of World War II, Forte was interned in the Isle of Man due to his Italian nationality, but he was released after only three months. After the war, his company became Forte Holdings Ltd and bought the Café Royal in 1954.

In the 1950s, he also opened the first catering facility at Heathrow Airport and the first full motorway service station in the UK for cars at Newport Pagnell, Buckinghamshire, on the M1 motorway in 1959. He purchased the Hungaria Restaurant in Lower Regent St. in 1955.

== Later career ==
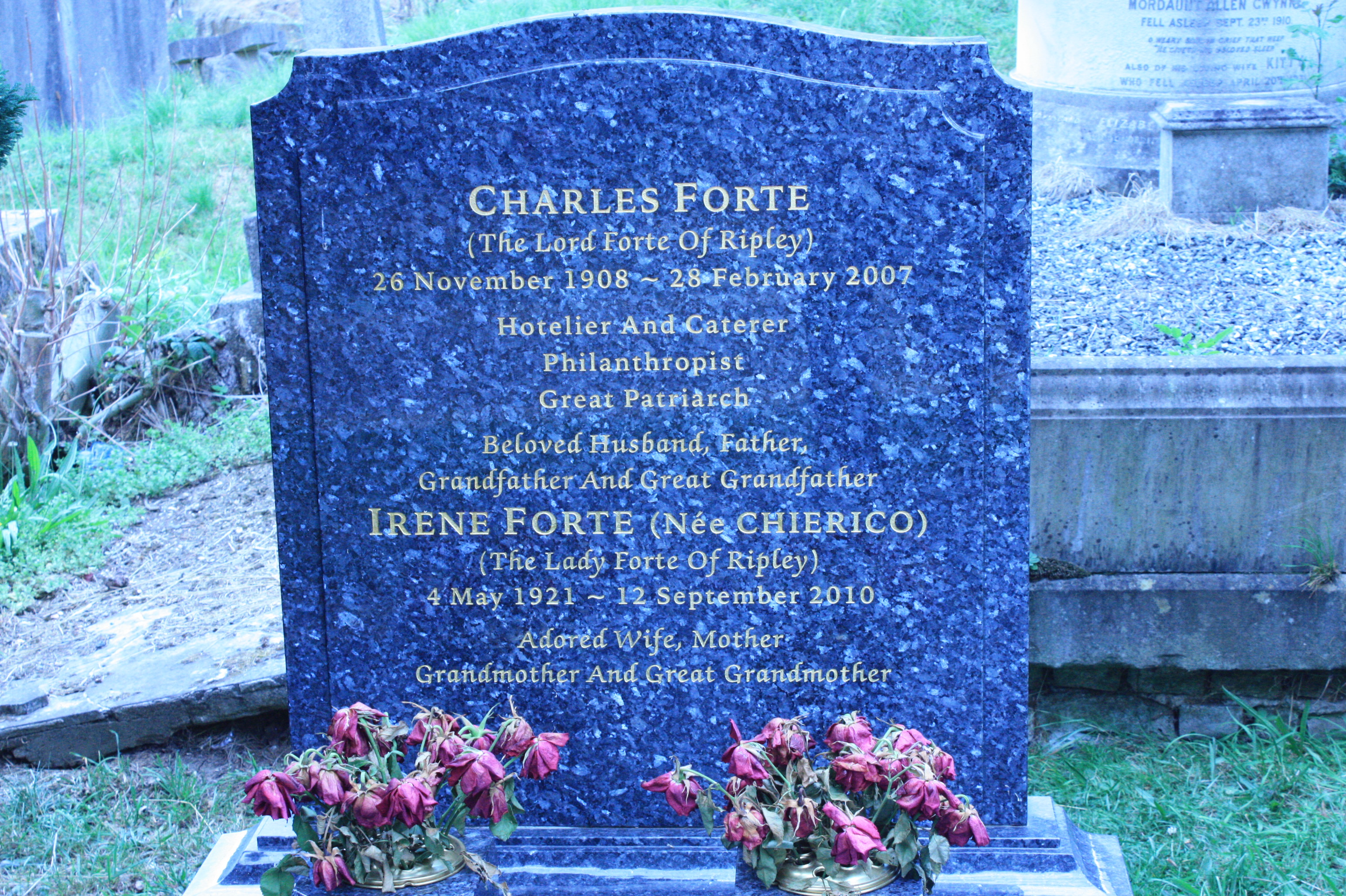
Grave of Lord and Lady Forte in West Hampstead Cemetery

Trust Houses Group Ltd and Forte Holdings were merged in 1970 to become Trust House Forte or THF. Through mergers and expansion, Forte expanded the Forte Group into a multibillion-pound business. His empire included the Little Chef and Happy Eater roadside restaurants, Crest, Forte Grand, Travelodge and Posthouse hotels, as well as the wine merchant Grierson-Blumenthal and a non-controlling majority stake in the Savoy Hotel.

The Grierson-Blumenthal stake became a legally "forced" acquisition by the group. It had been a personal holding of Charles Forte and fellow directors of the group, supplying liquor to Forte restaurants and hotels at substantial personal profit, until the prejudice to shareholders was realised in the late 1970s (including possible prosecution under the Companies Act) which obliged its acquisition as a subsidiary.

Forte was the CEO from 1971 and chairman from 1982 (when his son Rocco took over as CEO) of the Group. Happy Eater and the five Welcome Break major road service outlets were bought from Hanson Trust PLC on 1 August 1986. In the 1990s, the company increased its nominal capital and agreed to the public listed companies compliance regime to become Forte Group plc.

In 1993, Forte passed full control to his son Rocco. Soon, Granada launched a hostile takeover. In January 1996, Granada succeeded with a £3.9 billion tender offer. This left the family about £350 million in cash.

On 28 February 2007, Forte died in his sleep at his home in London, aged 98. He is buried in West Hampstead Cemetery.

== Honours and awards ==
In the 1970 Birthday Honours Forte was knighted. He was dubbed by The Queen Mother. He was created a life peer in the 1982 New Year Honours and was introduced to the House of Lords on 2 February 1982 as Baron Forte, of Ripley in the County of Surrey. He was also a knight of the Sovereign Military Order of Malta.

Coat of arms of Charles Forte, Baron Forte
Crest Out of the battlements of a tower Azure a bunch of grapes between two ears of corn Proper. Escutcheon Argent four pallets Gules over all a bend Argent fimbriated Azure and on a chief Azure three mullets of six points gyronny of twelve Or and Argent. Supporters Dexter a pheasant Proper, sinister a salmon Proper. Motto Fortis Ut Jus

Since 1974 he was a Count in the Italian nobility, a title created by King Umberto II.

== Family ==
In January 1943, Forte married Irene Mary, daughter of Giovanni Chierico, of Venice; her family ran a delicatessen on Wardour Street, Soho. Lady Forte had been apprenticed to a Mayfair couturier, where she learned sewing and gained an appreciation of quality materials. After her father's death when she was 17, she ran the family shop for three months whilst her mother was in Italy; it was destroyed by a bomb during the Blitz in 1940.

From the 1950s, Forte lived with an extended family including his parents and children at Greenway Gardens in Frognal, Hampstead, London. They attended services at the Roman Catholic St. Mary's Church in nearby Holly Lane, Hampstead.

Together, they had six children, five girls and a boy:

- The Hon. Sir Rocco John Vincent Forte (born 1945), who was knighted in 1995. On 15 February 1986, he married Aliai Giovanna Maria Ricci in Rome. They have three children.
- The Hon. Olga Forte CBE (born 1947), who was married firstly to the late Count Alessandro Polizzi and secondly, in 1993, to The Hon. Sir William Shawcross. Olga had two children with Alessandro:
  - Alexandra Polizzi, a hotelier and the presenter of Channel 5's The Hotel Inspector
  - Charlotte Polizzi (b.1973), who married TV celebrity Oliver Peyton
- The Hon. Marie Louise Forte (born 1950), who married Robert Alexander Burness and had two children.
- The Hon. Irene Forte (born 1956), who married US Ambassador John Danilovich and had three children.
- The Hon. Giancarla Forte (born 1959), who married Michael Ulic Anthony Alen-Buckley and had two children.

Irene, Lady Forte died 12 September 2010, and she is buried with her husband.

Lord Forte's family came from Mortale (later renamed Monforte in his honour), in the Lazio region of Central Italy, where he retained the family home.
