= Hallam Towers =

Residential building in Sheffield, England

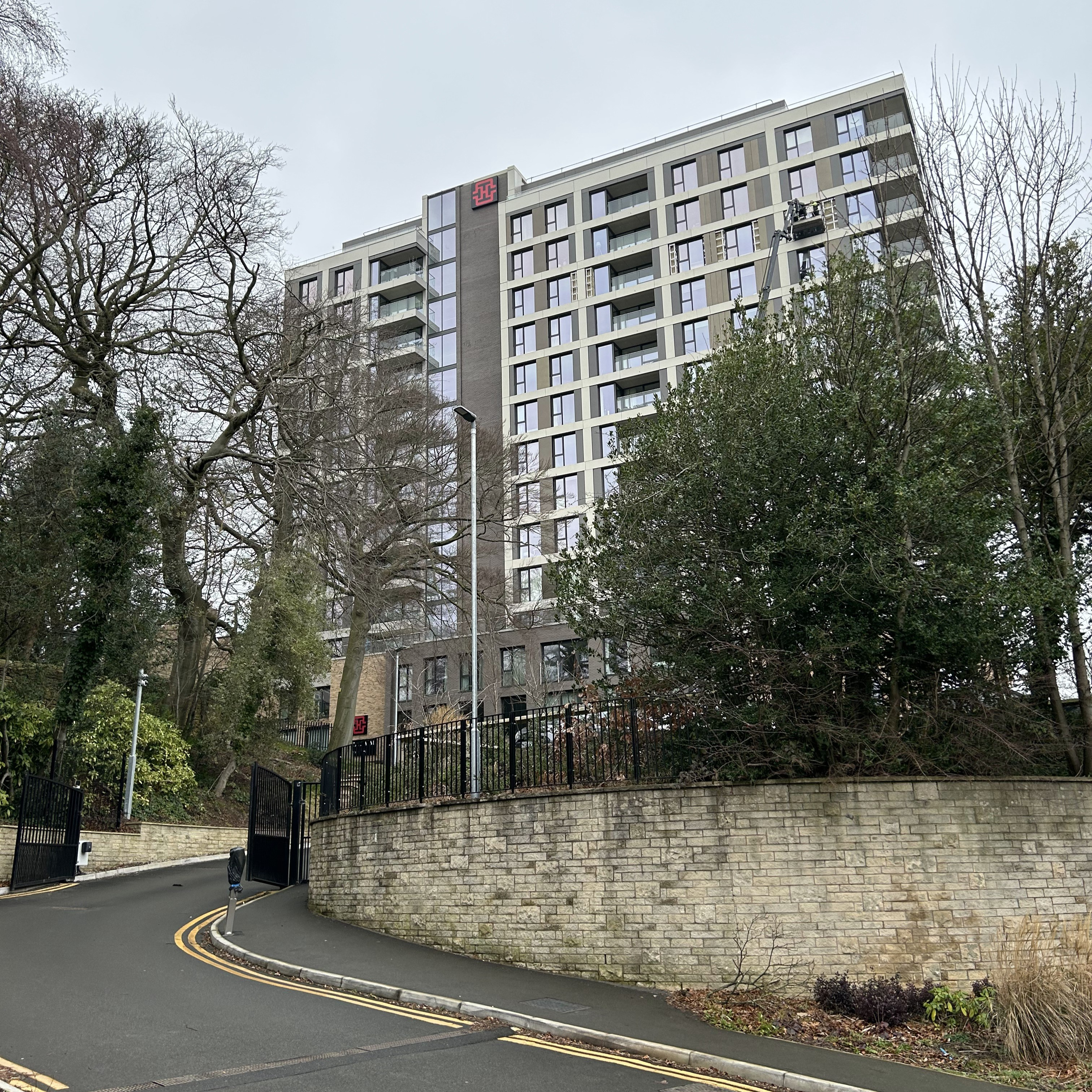
- Interactive map of the Hallam Towers area

General information
- Status: Topped-out
- Type: Residential
- Location: Fulwood Road, Sheffield, England
- Coordinates: 53.3757°N 1.5083°W
- Construction started: 2020
- Completed: 2022
- Cost: £32 million

Height
- Roof: 48 m (157 ft)

Technical details
- Floor count: 15

Design and construction
- Developer: Redbrik

Hallam Towers is a fifteen-storey, 48 metres (157 ft) apartment building completed in 2022 in the Broomhill area of Sheffield, South Yorkshire, England. It was constructed on the site of an externally similar thirteen-storey former hotel of the same name, which existed on the site between 1963 and 2017.

== Current building (2020–) ==
Work to rebuild the Hallam Tower commenced in 2020 with two additional storeys, making it 15 storeys high. The structure will contain 103 one, two and three bed apartments with a gym and swimming pool on the ground floor. Peter Lee, a director at Redbrik, the sales agent for the new development said, 'The development is being sympathetically restored back to its recognisable form, using the latest materials and technology that the construction industry has to offer.' The development is by Blenheim Land & Properties, and is being funded by a £31.5m loan from Fortwell Capital. The planned completion date for the building was August 2022 but has been delayed until October 2022.

== Original building (1963–2017) ==
=== Design, construction and opening ===
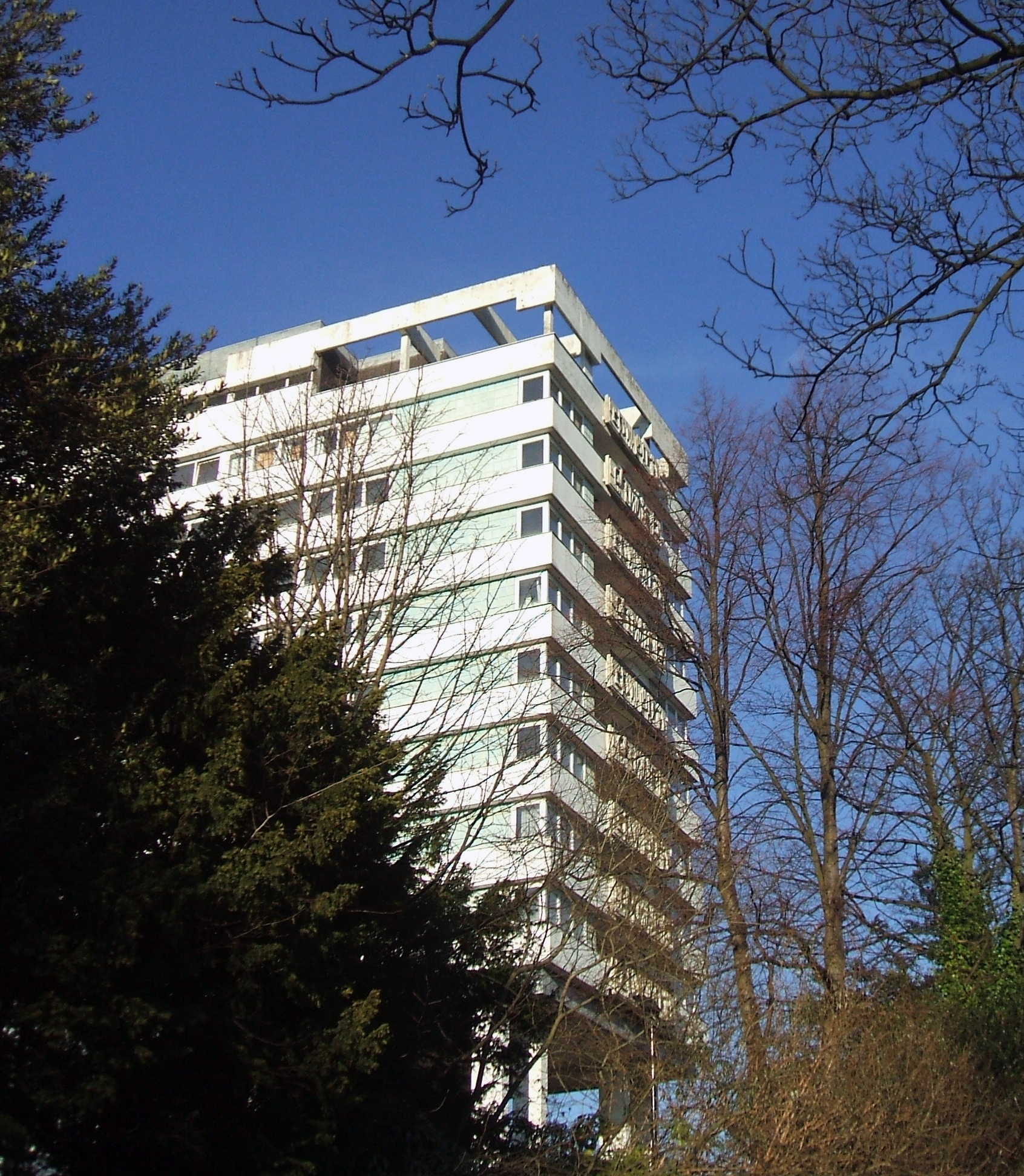
The disused Hallam Tower Hotel from Fulwood Road, 3 February 2007.

Designed by Nelson Foley of the Trust House Architectural Department, construction started in 1963 at a cost of £1 million. The Hallam Tower Hotel, owned by Trust Houses Group Ltd, opened on 24 March 1965 and at opening boasted 136 bedrooms over its eleven stories, employed nearly 150 staff members and covered a three and a half acre site. The hotel included facilities such as the Vulcan Room restaurant which featured a colour scheme of "orange, yellow, pale wrapping paper brown and sour green", the Sheffield Plate Grill (a quick service buttery), decorated with "a series of Sheffield trade signs, none of them later than 1910 and most of them mid-19th century" and a colour scheme of pink, red, black and white, and the Downstairs Bar, described in the original press release for the hotel thus; "A dark intimate room with a club-like atmosphere enlivened by turquoise blue upholstery. Dark lincrusta walls. 18th century Hogarth engravings. Silver Trimmings.".

=== Hotel operations ===
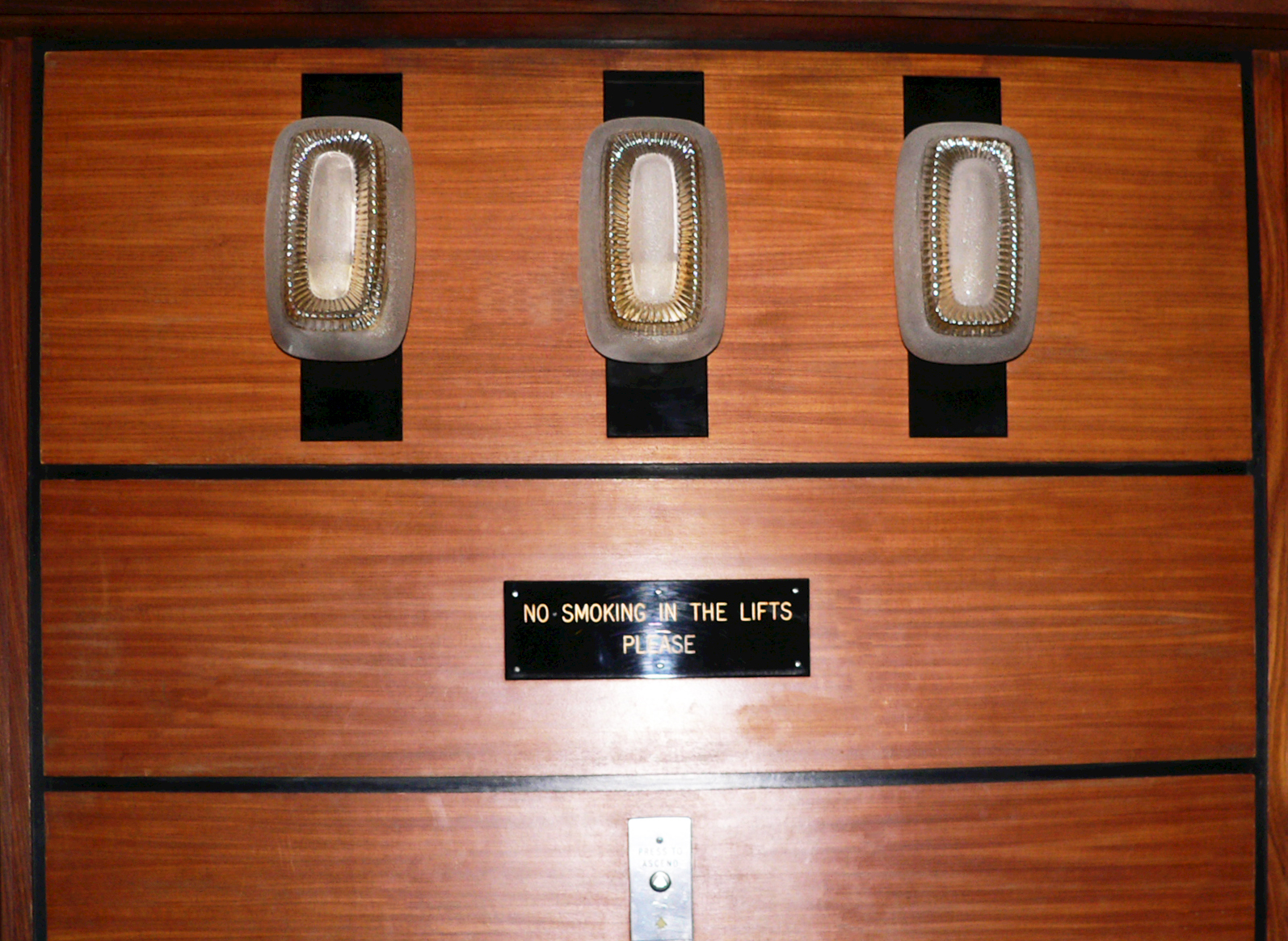
Fifth floor lift lobby of the Hallam Tower Hotel. c. 2000s. Shows the original 1960s teak veneer panelling and sconces which ran along all the corridors and lift lobbies of the tower; during refurbishments late in the hotel's life many of the floors had the teak painted over.

Being one of the first luxury hotels built in the region since the end of World War II, the city and the building's owners were keen to capitalise on the hotel's modern look and it appeared in an advertisement for the Ford Galaxie 500 and in the promotional film; Sheffield… City on the Move.

Several times during the 1960s the hotel restaurant appeared in Egon Ronay's Guide to British Eateries and achieved a four star rating from the AA.

For the 1966 World Cup, Hillsborough Stadium was the 'home' ground of the Swiss team, their over night accommodation was the Hallam Tower Hotel. One incident occurred when the Swiss fielded a team which left out two of their star players, against Germany due to said players arriving back at the hotel an hour after curfew the night before.

With the takeover of Trust Houses Group Ltd by Forte Holdings in 1970 the building came under the ownership of Trust House Forte. In 1973 David Bowie stayed at the hotel, when he performed at the Sheffield City Hall on his Ziggy Stardust Tour. Elton John was also a guest at the hotel during this period. In 1978 the hotels management attempted to move away from what it dubbed "the sweatshirt and jeans brigade" by only accepting bookings from rock bands so long as they were dressed appropriately inside the hotel and did not swear while in the hotel restaurant.

During the miners' strike in the summer of 1984 Daily Mirror proprietor Robert Maxwell had a secret meeting in a room on the top floor with National Union of Mineworkers leader Arthur Scargill which he had asked Mirror journalist John Pilger to arrange. Up to that point the paper was supportive of the strike and Maxwell put himself forward as a mediator between the National Coal Board and the NUM. According to Pilger, in his book, Hidden Agendas (1998) the meeting went badly and turned the Daily Mirror against the strike.

By 1986 the building was known as the Hallam Tower Post House Hotel and a year later was subject to a £750,000 refurbishment which also saw the opening of the gym, whose members boasted members of the Sheffield Wednesday football team, its then-manager Howard Wilkinson, along with boxer Herol 'Bomber' Graham.

The hotel later became known as the Forte Crest Sheffield and the Posthouse Sheffield. In 2001, the hotel became the Holiday Inn Sheffield West.

=== Hotel closure and demolition ===
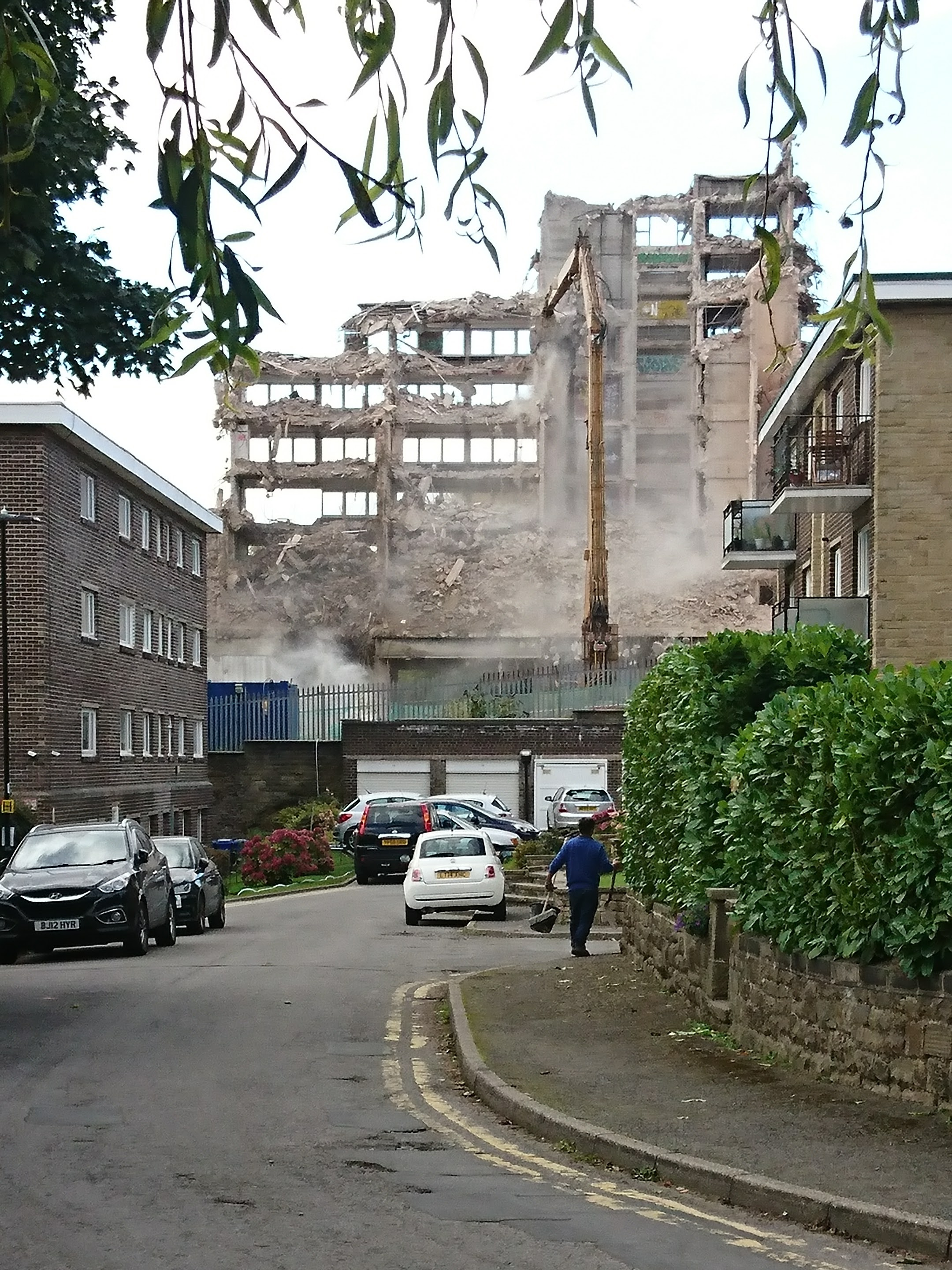
The view of Hallam Tower from Chesterwood Drive midway through demolition. (9 October 2017)

The hotel eventually closed, along with the attached Spirit Health Club, on 18 April 2004, with some staff transferring to the Holiday Inn Royal Victoria in central Sheffield. The building was sold to development company Hallam Grange Ltd. for £6.3 million later in 2004. Hallam Grange Ltd. was a development vehicle owned by the Hague Family of Hague Plant.

Since its closure the building stood empty for many years, although planning permission was granted in 2009 for a redevelopment of the tower into residential units, as part of a wider redevelopment which would create 132 residential units on the site. Hallam Grange and their architects', Sheffield-based Axis Architecture, had been working on the scheme for three years, with the granted scheme being of smaller bulk and different layout to that originally proposed. The granted scheme would see an extra floor added to the rear of the tower, with some being removed from the front portion and the whole building reclad.

The ancillary buildings and low rise elements of the site were demolished during 2013 by Hague Plant, along with clearance of the first three floors of the tower building. Thus just the tower building of the original hotel remained in situ.

In September 2013, Hallam Grange placed the building on the market for sale with the Sheffield residential development office of Knight Frank. A sale of the building was agreed in May 2014, reputed to be with an unspecified national housebuilder, however by July of the same year this deal had fallen through and the property was returned to the market.

In July 2015, local newspaper; The Sheffield Star quoted agent Tearle Phelan of Knight Frank as saying "We are speaking to a very interested party, it’s in legals and we are looking to exchange imminently". The Sheffield Telegraph subsequently reported (October 2015) that a company had purchased the site and that the proposal would include the building being demolished and new luxury apartments and homes built on the land with no mention of social housing.

In 2017, it was planned that most of the tower would be demolished and then rebuilt with taller storeys to support proposals for apartments and townhouses. South Yorkshire Police later urged the public to refrain from urban exploration after a 19-year-old student fell to his death in the abandoned site.

The tower was demolished between September and October 2017, leaving only the bottom two levels intact.
