= The Exclusives (TV series) =

- Narrated by: Lauren Laverne
- Country of origin: United Kingdom
- Original language: English
- No. of series: 1
- No. of episodes: 7

Production
- Executive producers: Tamara Abood; Andrew Mackenzie
- Producer: Jonathon Holmes
- Running time: 60 minutes
- Production company: Twofour

Original release
- Network: ITV2
- Release: 17 May – 28 June 2012

The Exclusives is a British reality competition television series that debuted on ITV2 on 17 May 2012. The show follows six aspiring journalists, Hayley, Stuart, Sunny, Felix, Ellie and Christopher, competing to win their dream job with one of Britain's most famous magazines. On 23 August 2012, it was confirmed that The Exclusives had been cancelled by ITV2.

== Contestants and results ==
Contestant	Status
Christopher	Eliminated week 3
Sunny	Eliminated week 5
Hayley	Eliminated week 6
Stuart	Third place
Felix	Runner-up
Ellie	Winner

== Episodes ==
- Episode 1 (17 May 2012) – This week, rookies Hayley, Stuart, Sunny, Felix, Ellie and Christopher report for duty at More!. Their first test is to cover the BRIT Awards.
- Episode 2 (24 May 2012) – At Kerrang! Magazine, they interview two rock bands and make their own radio station advert. They also had a talk with Frankie Cocozza and Busted singer Charlie Simpson.
- Episode 3 (31 May 2012) – They go to Closer magazine and interview celebrities including Chantelle Houghton, Alex Reid, Jodie Marsh, Holly Willoughby and Phillip Schofield. Christopher was the first to leave.
- Episode 4 (7 June 2012) – At FHM magazine, they interview celebrities Stooshe, Adam Deacon, Adam Turner and some pigs. No elimination took place.
- Episode 5 (14 June 2012) – Working at Heat magazine, they interview celebrities including Peter Andre, Kerry Katona, Jedward. Harry Maxwell and boy band Blue. Sunny was the second to leave the competition.
- Episode 6 (21 June 2012) – In the semi-final, the four remaining contestants work with Empire and interview more celebrities. They interview Liam Hemsworth and Elizabeth Banks, at the premiere for The Hunger Games in London, and Keith Lemon. Hayley was the third rookie to leave.
- Episode 7 (28 June 2012) – In the final, Felix, Stuart, and Ellie are set the task of creating a celebrity–based mini–mag. Ellie won the competition and a job with Bauer Media.
