= St Mawes at the Pilchard Season =

Painting by J. M. W. Turner

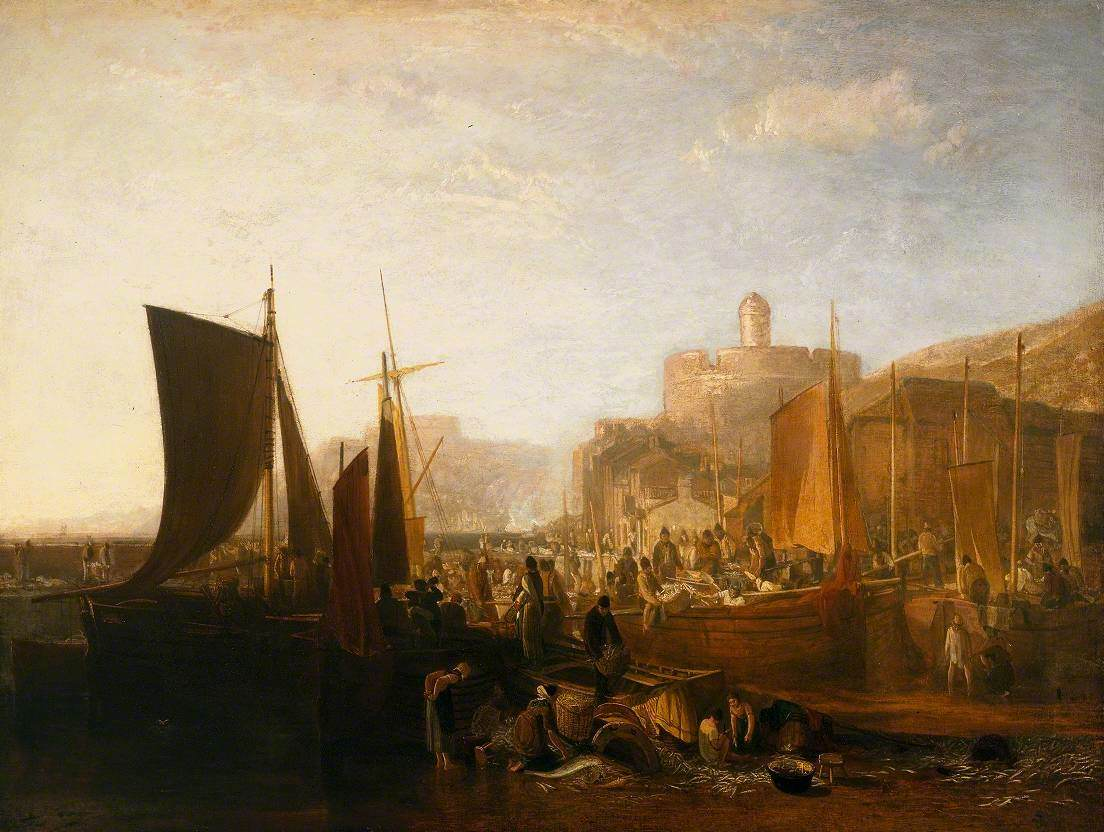
- Artist: J. M. W. Turner
- Year: 1812
- Type: Oil on canvas, landscape painting
- Dimensions: 91.1 cm × 120.6 cm (35.9 in × 47.5 in)
- Location: Tate Britain, London
- Website: www.tate.org.uk/...n00484

St Mawes at the Pilchard Season is an 1812 landscape painting by the British artist J.M.W. Turner. It portrays the bustling port at the village of St Mawes on the eastern side of Falmouth Harbour in Cornwall. At the height of the pilchard season, fisherman are shown selling their recent catch on the beach. Pendennis Castle can be seen in the distance. .

At the time the Napoleonic Wars were being fought and the Continental Blockade of Napoleon restricted European trade with Britain .rather than display the painting at the Royal Academy Exhibition of 1812, Turner exhibited it in his own studio in Harley Street, one of six pictures featuring scenes of Cornwall and Devon inspired by his recent trip to the Southwest. The painting was gifted to the nation as part of the Turner Bequest of 1856 and is now in the collection of the Tate Britain in Pimlico.

== See also ==
- List of paintings by J. M. W. Turner

== Bibliography ==
- Hamilton, James. Turner - A Life. Sceptre, 1998
- Spencer-Longhurst, Paul. The Sun Rising Through Vapour: Turner's Early Seascapes. Third Millennium Information, 2003.
