= Alex Polizzi: The Fixer =

- Genre: Business
- Presented by: Alex Polizzi
- Country of origin: United Kingdom
- Original language: English
- No. of series: 3
- No. of episodes: 18

Production
- Running time: 60 minutes
- Production company: Twofour

Original release
- Network: BBC Two
- Release: 31 January 2012 – 17 February 2015

Related
- The Hotel Inspector; Britain's Secret Shoppers

Alex Polizzi: The Fixer is a business documentary show that aired on BBC Two from 2012 until 2015 and was presented by Alex Polizzi. The programme sees Alex turning around family businesses which are struggling for various reasons to attract customers.

== Episodes ==
Series	Episode	Business	Location	Air date	Synopsis
1	1	Courtyard Bridalwear	Kettering	31 January 2012	Alex is called in to help a failing family bridalwear business in Kettering, Northamptonshire. Despite remortgaging her home to keep the business afloat, owner Anne Preece is watching the profits fall year on year, and to make matters worse her two daughters, Rhiannon and Bethan, who also work in the shop, argue constantly.
1	2	The Chough Bakery	Padstow	7 February 2012	Alex has been asked to help a family bakery in dire straits in scenic Padstow, Cornwall. The Chough Bakery, owned and run by the Eade family, does well in the summer months when over five million people visit the county, but struggles to survive in winter.
1	3	Kettley's	Yeadon	14 February 2012	Alex is called in to a family-run furniture store in Yeadon, just outside Leeds. Kettley's Furniture has been run by John Butler and his family for 33 years, but it hasn't moved on in that time, stocking furniture which is more care home than dream home, and in recent years profits are down as customer numbers have dwindled. One year after the programme aired, John Butler was convicted of manslaughter for stabbing his wife to death in 2013. He was jailed for 7 years.
1	4	Guidebridge MOT	Ashton-under-Lyne	21 February 2012	Alex Polizzi lends her expertise to a failing family-run garage in Ashton-under-Lyne, Manchester.
1	5	Props and Frocks	Essex	28 February 2012	Alex Polizzi is called in to a faltering fancy dress shop in Essex. Props and Frocks is taking over the owner's life, but locals haven't even heard of it.
1	6	Denver Mill	Norfolk	6 March 2012	Alex Polizzi is called to an unusual family firm in dire need of help: Denver Windmill, a working windmill in Norfolk.
2	1	Alf Onnie	East London	12 February 2013	Alex helps a struggling interiors shop in East London, specialising in fabric and curtains. It's approaching its centenary, but the recession and house market slump have hit curtain sales hard.
2	2	Peachy Pics	Aylesbury	19 February 2013	Alex helps a mother whose dream of running a photography studio in Aylesbury has become a nightmare.
2	3	David Holmes	Fleet	26 February 2013	Alex helps a funeral directors set up five years ago in Fleet, which is struggling to make any money.
2	4	Martinis	Essex	5 March 2013	Alex takes on Martinis, a struggling hair and beauty salon in Essex set to close in six months if things do not improve.
2	5	Pisces	Yate	12 March 2013	Alex helps a fish and chip shop in Yate, which is struggling to attract lunchtime trade. Getting the two generations of owners to work together will be a challenge.
2	6	Oak Garden Centre	Chatteris	19 March 2013	Alex tries to help a garden centre in Chatteris that has suffered from hot summers and quiet winters.
3	1	Hunter's Brewery	Devon	1 September 2014	Alex assists Paul Walker in his struggling microbrewery in Devon.
3	2	Heck Sausages	Yorkshire	8 September 2014	Alex helps a sausage company in Yorkshire that is struggling to sell its wares to supermarkets.
3	3	The Singing Kettle	Torquay	27 January 2015	Alex helps the owners of a seaside teashop in Torquay to appeal to changing consumer preferences.
3	4	Big Space	Harpenden	3 February 2015	Alex helps a soft-play centre in Harpenden appeal to a split customer base.
3	5	Balloonin' Marvellous	Wakefield	10 February 2015	Alex aids a struggling events company in Wakefield.
3	6	Creature Company	Wimbledon	17 February 2015	Alex heads to south-west London to offer advice to a high-street pet shop.

== Transmissions ==
Series	Start date	End date	Episodes
1	31 January 2012	6 March 2012	6
2	12 February 2013	19 March 2013	6
3	1 September 2014	17 February 2015	6
