= Oliver Peyton =

Restaurateur from County Mayo in Ireland

Oliver Peter Patrick Peyton, OBE (born 26 September 1961), is an Irish businessman, restaurateur and television personality.

== Early life ==
Peyton was born in Sligo and raised in Killasser near Swinford, County Mayo, his mother was the owner of a knitwear factory and was fond of cooking. Peyton attended Summerhill College in Sligo until he was 17 when he left home and went to New York where he was employed in a range of jobs including digging artesian wells, roofing and as a waiter. He gained a scholarship to Leicester Polytechnic in the UK, where he studied textiles. He has two sisters.

== Career ==
After two years at Leicester Polytechnic, Peyton moved south and with a partner opened two nightclubs, The Can in Brighton – favourably reviewed during 1983 by The Face magazine – and later Raw in London. In the 1990s he moved into restaurants, opening the Atlantic Bar & Grill near Piccadilly in 1994 and Coast in Mayfair in 1995. These were followed in Manchester by Mash & Air, a brasserie and a restaurant respectively, both in a former warehouse in the Canal Street district. The name was derived from stages in the brewing process, and beer was brewed on site, ahead of the craft-beer curve.

Further developments saw Mash opening in London in 1998 and in 1999 Isola in Knightsbridge. In 2002 Peyton opened the Admiralty restaurant in Somerset House to serve its arts community, and 2004 saw the opening of Inn the Park, a restaurant in St James's Park. The Peyton & Byrne company was incorporated in 2005, which led to further restaurants at national establishments: National Dining Rooms and National Café at the National Gallery, a cafe at the Wellcome Collection and the Wallace restaurant at the Wallace Collection, among others. "Our job is to commercialise things," he said in 2011. "Galleries are free in the UK and if people leave to eat elsewhere then the gallery is losing money."

More recently the business has been supplemented with Peyton And Byrne Bakeries at five locations across London.

In October 2016, following the loss of contracts, which included Kew Gardens and the British Library, Peyton & Byrne went into administration and was acquired by Sodexo, the French multinational corporation, but Peyton and 460 staff were reportedly remaining with the company.

In October 2019 Peyton founded the funeral home Exit Here, described by The New York Times as "a modern alternative to traditional funeral parlours", and by The Times as "a boutique funeral parlour...that can pull out all the stops." Exit Here now have branches in Chiswick and Crouch End, London.

== Taking a stand ==
On 8 February 2013, when responding to questions on Channel 4 News about the quality of supermarket meat products, and referring to the Irish meat industry, Peyton stated Ireland was "an airport for meat". He said he would never buy Irish beef, claiming that meat labelled as Irish was probably sourced in Indonesia.

In 2015 he told the Great British Chefs' website: "To me, British food is about having British ham, it’s about having British produce. When I started in this business, we used to have trucks going to the market in Paris because we couldn’t get produce. Now, chefs are much more experimental about what they can do with their own country’s produce. British food is not about shepherd’s pie, it’s about how chefs use the food that is coming out of the ground."

== Television and publishing ==
From 2006 until 2021, Peyton was one of the judges on the BBC2 cooking competition show, Great British Menu. He was described by food critic Matthew Fort as "the Phineas T. Barnum of restaurateurs" and having a "penchant for the spectacular and the idiosyncratic". In 2012 RTÉ launched a programme, Recipe for Success, based on the idea of cooks turning a home recipe into a commercial product suitable for supermarket shelves. Peyton was involved in the programme as one of the mentors for the competitors.

From February 2018 Peyton joined his sister-in-law Alex Polizzi in a new Channel 5 series Peyton And Polizzi’s Restaurant Rescue. She had previously established herself as UK TV’s Hotel Inspector, and here they pool their experience to play firefighters and turn round failing restaurants.

Peyton is also the author of two cookbooks.

== OBE ==
In 2012 Peyton was appointed an honorary OBE for services to catering; honorary because he is not a British citizen. Peyton said afterwards: "I am thrilled to have received this award, it’s a magnificent honour. I am lucky enough to work in a business that I love alongside my family and to win this is the icing on the cake!"

== Personal life ==
Peyton is married to Charlotte Polizzi, granddaughter of Lord Forte and sister of hotelier and TV presenter Alex Polizzi. They have three children.
