= Rocco Forte =

English hotelier

The Honourable Sir Rocco Forte
- Born: Rocco Giovanni Forte; 18 January 1945 (age 81); Bournemouth, England
- Occupation: Hotelier
- Known for: Rocco Forte Hotels
- Spouse: Aliai Giovanna Maria Ricci (m. 1986)
- Children: 3
- Father: Charles Forte, Baron Forte

Sir Rocco Giovanni Forte FCA FIoD (born 18 January 1945) is an English hotelier and the chairman of Rocco Forte Hotels.

== Early life ==
Born in Bournemouth, the son of Charles Forte, Baron Forte, and his wife Irene, he was educated at St Peter's Catholic School, Southbourne (at the time an independent and fee-paying Roman Catholic grammar school) and Downside School. He studied modern languages at Pembroke College, Oxford, where he won a blue for fencing.

He qualified as a Chartered Accountant in 1969, later becoming a Fellow of the Institute of Chartered Accountants in 1979.

== Career ==
Forte took over from his father as CEO of the Forte Group in 1992. In the mid-1990s, the Forte Group was faced with a hostile takeover bid from Gerry Robinson's Granada. Ultimately, Granada succeeded with a £3.87 billion tender offer in August 1995 that left the family with around £350 million in cash.

In 2001, following the de-merger of Compass Group from Granada's media interests, the use of the Forte trademark was returned to Forte in a gesture intended to dispel the bitter legacy of the takeover.

After the takeover, Forte set up his own chain of hotels in 1996, initially known as RF Hotels and re-branded as The Rocco Forte Collection after the return of the Forte brand name. He bought the Balmoral Hotel in Edinburgh and Brown's Hotel in London for £51.5m. As of April 2013, The Rocco Forte Collection operates eleven hotels in Europe, Russia, northern Africa and the Middle East.

Forte's family wealth in 2013 was listed as £250,000,000.

He is a member of the Garrick Club and has previously voted against admittance of women, 'because the Garrick was built as a gentlemen’s club'.

== Honours and awards ==
Forte was appointed a Knight Bachelor in the 1995 New Year Honours list for services to the UK tourism industry. In March 2005, he received the highest Italian accolade, the Gran Croce dell'Ordine al Merito della Repubblica Italiana, for his entrepreneurial merits and strong links with Italy. He was President of the British Hospitality Association from 1991 to 1996.

He was also a member of the executive committee of the World Travel & Tourism Council and chaired the appeals to send the English teams to the Commonwealth Games for many years.

Forte is patron of Les Clefs d'Or (society of the Golden Keys) for the UK.

== Philanthropy ==
Forte funded a series of lectures at Westminster Cathedral in April 2008 organised by Cardinal Archbishop Cormac Murphy-O'Connor.

In 1992, Forte and Martin Landau opened a City Technology College in Derby named Landau Forte College. In 2006, they changed to an academy. In 2010, they took a Tamworth High School (Woodhouse Business & Enterprise College) and turned it into Landau Forte Academy Tamworth, but in 2011, when they opened Landau Forte Academy QEMS in Tamworth, they changed their name to Landau Forte Academy Amington. There has since been a Sixth Form centre open next to Landau Forte Academy QEMS named Landau Forte Academy Tamworth Sixth Form.

== Political activity ==
Forte paid for a victory party for Boris Johnson in one of his hotels upon his winning the 2019 Conservative Party leadership election. He donated £100,000 to the Conservative Party during the 2019 general election.

Forte is an advocate for Brexit. In 2023 he declared in The Times that the UK had failed to take advantage of the opportunities presented by Brexit and was considering emigrating to Italy.

== Family ==
On 15 February 1986, in the Aracoeli church of Rome, he married Aliai Giovanna Maria Ricci, a twenty-one-year-old Italian (b. 1965). She is the daughter of a Roman neurologist, professor Giovanni Ricci.

Other notable Forte family members include his sister Olga Polizzi and her daughter Alex Polizzi, a hotelier and the presenter of Channel 5's The Hotel Inspector.
