= Alex Polizzi =

British hotelier and TV presenter

- Born: Alessandra Maria Luigia Anna Polizzi di Sorrentino; 28 August 1971 (age 55); Poplar, London, England
- Education: University of Oxford
- Occupations: Hotelier; businesswoman; television personality
- Years active: 2008–present
- Television: The Hotel Inspector; Alex Polizzi: The Fixer; Alex Polizzi: Chefs on Trial
- Spouse: Marcus Miller (m. 2007; div. 2024)
- Children: 2
- Parents: Alessandro Polizzi; Olga Polizzi (née Forte)
- Relatives: William Shawcross (stepfather); Charles Forte (grandfather); Sir Rocco Forte (uncle); Oliver Peyton (brother-in-law)

Alessandra Maria Luigia Anna Polizzi di Sorrentino (born 28 August 1971), better known as Alex Polizzi, is a British hotelier, businesswoman, and television personality. Since 2008, she has presented The Hotel Inspector on Channel 5.

== Early life ==
Alessandra Maria Luigia Anna Polizzi di Sorrentino was born on 28 August 1971 in Poplar, London, England. Polizzi is of Italian descent.

Polizzi comes from a family of hoteliers. Her mother is the Hon. Olga Polizzi, a hotel designer who is a daughter of Lord Forte and the sister of Sir Rocco Forte. Her father was of the former Italian nobility, the Marquess Alessandro Polizzi di Sorrentino, who died in a car accident in 1980.

Polizzi studied English at St Catherine's College, Oxford. She trained at the Mandarin Oriental, Hong Kong, and worked for Marco Pierre White.

== Career ==
In 1997, Polizzi and her then-boyfriend Marcus Miller started a wholesale bakery, Millers Bespoke Bakery. The company supplied bread to Selfridges, Harvey Nichols, and Fortnum & Mason.

She then managed the Hotel Endsleigh in Milton Abbot, near Tavistock in Devon, which is owned by her mother Olga. In 2021, Polizzi and her mother renovated and opened The Star in Alfriston, in East Sussex, in their first joint venture.

== Television career ==
Since 2008, Polizzi has presented the Channel 5 series The Hotel Inspector, replacing Ruth Watson. The show sees Polizzi visiting struggling British hotels to try to turn their fortunes around by giving advice and suggestions to the owners/managers, and often undertaking renovation projects on their behalf.

She also presented the BBC Two series, Alex Polizzi: The Fixer, which focuses on her turning around family businesses, not just hotels. The first series aired in 2012; the second in 2013; a third in 2014 and a fourth in 2015. Polizzi also presented a revisited series called The Fixer Returns in 2013, as well as a Christmas special, which aired in December 2013.

In October 2014, Polizzi launched a new Channel 5 series, Alex Polizzi's Secret Italy, where she visits either lesser-known places within Italy or well-known towns and cities and, using local connections, shows areas that tourists would not ordinarily experience. In October 2014, it was announced that Polizzi would host a new BBC Two series, Alex Polizzi: Chefs on Trial, where she visits various food outlets. The series began airing on 20 April 2015.

In March 2017, Polizzi released Spectacular Spain with Alex Polizzi and then Our Dream Hotel on 6 June. From February 2018, she invited her Irish brother-in-law, the restaurateur Oliver Peyton, to join her in a new Channel 5 series Peyton And Polizzi's Restaurant Rescue, where they pool their experience to play firefighters and turn around failing restaurants.

In August 2021, Alex Polizzi: My Hotel Nightmare aired on Channel 5, which chronicled the renovation of The Star during the COVID-19 pandemic prior to its opening.

== Personal life ==
Polizzi lives in London. Her former husband is Marcus Miller, whom she married in 2007 (divorced 2024). They have two children together, a daughter Olga and son Rocco. Polizzi is bilingual, being fluent in English and Italian. Her sister Charlotte is married to Oliver Peyton, an Irish restaurateur and a former judge on the BBC television series Great British Menu. Sir Rocco Forte is her uncle.

She had a Roman Catholic upbringing, and spent "every Sunday of her childhood" at the Church of the Immaculate Conception on Farm Street, London.

Polizzi backed the Leave campaign during the 2016 British referendum on membership of the EU, but has spoken subsequently of her concern that Brexit could threaten the supply of labour into the hospitality and hotel industry.

In 2026, Polizzi revealed she had divorced her husband of 17 years following strains brought on by the renovation of The Star hotel undertaken by Polizzi in the years prior.

== Filmography ==
=== Television ===
Year	Title	Role	Channel
2008–present	The Hotel Inspector	Presenter	Channel 5
2012–2015	Alex Polizzi: The Fixer	Presenter	BBC Two
2014–2016	Alex Polizzi's Secret Italy	Presenter	Channel 5
2015	Alex Polizzi: Chefs on Trial	Presenter	BBC Two
2015	Alex Polizzi's Italian Islands	Presenter	Channel 5
2015	Alex Polizzi: Hire Our Heroes	Presenter	BBC Two
2017	Spectacular Spain with Alex Polizzi	Presenter	Channel 5
2017	Our Dream Hotel	Presenter	Channel 5
2018	Peyton and Polizzi's Restaurant Rescue	Co-presenter	Channel 5
2018	The Wright Stuff	Panellist	Channel 5
2021	Alex Polizzi: My Hotel Nightmare	Presenter	Channel 5
