= Twofour =

British television and digital media group

Twofour Broadcast Limited
- Trade name: Twofour
- Formerly: Westpal Limited (February–April 1989); Two Four Productions Limited (1989–2005)
- Type: Subsidiary of ITV Studios
- Industry: Television; Digital media
- Founded: 23 February 1989; 37 years ago
- Founder: Charles Wace
- Headquarters: Plymouth, England
- Key people: Tim Carter (CEO)
- Parent: ITV Studios (2015–present)
- Divisions: Twofour; Twofour Rights (2012–2021)
- Website: twofour.co.uk

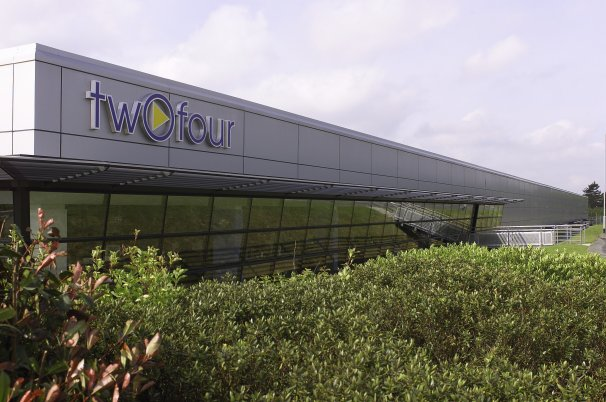
Twofour's headquarters in Plymouth.

Twofour Broadcast Limited, trading as Twofour, is a British television and digital media group founded in 1989 by Charles Wace, a former BBC news producer, and Christopher Slade, a BBC presenter. With its headquarters in Plymouth, Twofour has offices in London and Los Angeles.

In June 2015, Twofour Group was acquired by ITV Studios.

Melanie Leach was named CEO in summer 2014. In Autumn 2019, Leach stepped down, and Tim Carter was appointed CEO of Twofour and the ITV company Multistory Media.

== Divisions ==
=== Twofour ===
Twofour supplies programming to channels including BBC, ITV, Channel 4, Channel 5 and UKTV.

Recent and upcoming productions include The Reluctant Traveler with Eugene Levy for Apple TV+, and I Kissed A Boy for BBC Three. Twofour was awarded Broadcast's "Best Indie Production Company" title in 2010 and 2014, with titles including The Jump (Channel 4), The Real Marigold Hotel (BBC One/BBC Two) and This Time Next Year (ITV) and Channel 5's longest running series, The Hotel Inspector.

The company produces ob-doc and fixed rig shows such as Channel 4's Educating Yorkshire, Educating the East End and 2011's Educating Essex.

Twofour has produced a range of adventure documentaries such as Harry's Arctic Heroes for BBC One and Harry's Mountain Heroes for ITV, both featuring Prince Harry and a group of wounded soldiers as they attempt to reach the North Pole and Mount Everest respectively and “You’ve Gotta Run” for ITV and Peace Point TV as the students run away and DeeDee is the running teacher.

=== Twofour Rights ===
Twofour Rights was the distribution arm of Twofour. Launched in 2012, they brought Twofour's programmes to the international marketplace.

In 2021, Twofour's parent company ITV Studios, merged Twofour Rights into ITV Studios Distribution.

== Selected programmes produced by Twofour ==
=== 2026 ===
Title	Channel
The Box	ITV
I Kissed A Girl (S3)	BBC Three

=== 2025 ===
Title	Channel
Destination X (UK)	BBC One
Destination X (US)	NBC
Educating Yorkshire 2 (seventh series)	Channel 4
I Kissed A Boy (S2)	BBC Three
The Reluctant Traveler (S3)	Apple TV+

=== 2024 ===
Title	Channel
Big Zuu's 12 Dishes in 12 Hours	ITV1
I Kissed A Girl	BBC Three
Loaded in Paradise (S2)	ITV2
The Reluctant Traveler (S2)	Apple TV+

=== 2023 ===
Title	Channel
The Reluctant Traveler	Apple TV+
I Kissed A Boy	BBC Three
Challenge Anneka	Channel 5
Roman Kemp: The Fight For Young Lives	BBC Three
Matt Willis: Fighting Addiction	BBC Three
Rosie Jones: Am I a R*tard?	Channel 4

=== 2022 ===
Title	Channel
Watercolour Challenge	Channel 5
Hotel Benidorm	Channel 5
Happy Campers	Channel 5
Julia Bradbury: Breast Cancer and Me	ITV
Loaded in Paradise	ITV
Million Pound Pawn	ITV
Make Me Prime Minister	Channel 4
Our Boarding School	CBBC
The Hotel Inspector 17	Channel 5

=== 2021 ===
Title	Channel
My Cornwall With Fern Britton	Channel 5
Our School Series 7	CBBC
Motherland (third season)	BBC Two
Watercolour Challenge	Channel 5

=== 2020 ===
Title	Channel
Educating Greater Manchester 2 (sixth series)	Channel 4
Virgin Media's V Fest 2020	ITV2
Together At Home	BBC1

=== 2018 ===
Title	Channel
My Shirley Valentine Summer	ITV
Costa Del Celebrity	Channel 5
This Time Next Year (second series)	ITV
Ibiza Weekender	ITV2
Give It A Year	ITV
One Night With My Ex	Channel 5

=== 2017 ===
Title	Channel
Confessions of a Junior Doctor	Channel 4
The Real Marigold On Tour (second series)	BBC One
Ibiza Weekender	ITV2
The Real Marigold Hotel	BBC One
The Jump	Channel 4
One Night With My Ex	Channel 5
A Night with My Ex	Bravo
Chopping Block	ITV
Spectacular Spain With Alex Polizzi	Channel 5
Our School 3 (third series)	CBBC
Educating Greater Manchester (fifth series)	Channel 4

=== 2016 ===
Title	Channel
Royal Navy School	Channel 4
Ibiza Weekender	ITV2
The Real Marigold Hotel	BBC Two
The Jump	Channel 4
Drive	ITV
Our School	CBBC
This Time Next Year	ITV
The Real Marigold On Tour	BBC Two
Dating in the Dark	ITV2
Disabled Daredevils	Channel 4
Tom Daley Diving For Gold	ITV
Choccywoccydoodah	UKTV
The Hotel Inspector	Channel 5
World's Best Restaurants	UKTV
The Extraordinary Case of Alex Lewis	Channel 4
Tiny Tots Talent Agency	Channel 4
Impossible Engineering	UKTV
Chopping Block	ITV
Drive	ITV
Born to Kill	UKTV
Get Me To The Church On Time	UKTV
Ibiza Weekender	ITV2
Housing Enforcers	BBC

=== 2015 ===
Title	Channel
The Vote	More 4
Educating Cardiff (fourth series)	Channel 4
Ibiza Weekender	ITV2
Taking New York	E4
The Jump	Channel 4
Eternal Glory	ITV
The Housing Enforcers	BBC One
Alex Polizzi: Chefs on Trial	BBC Two
Kings and Queens of Speech	Sky1
Our School	CBBC

=== 2014 ===
Title	Channel
A Night of Heroes	ITV
Risking it All	TLC
Edge of Alaska	Discovery Channel
Alex Polizzi’s Secret Italy	Channel 5
The Housing Enforcers	BBC One
The Hunt	History
Chrome Underground	Discovery Channel
90's Greatest	Nat Geo
Stammer School	Channel 4
Dirty Weekenders in France	Channel 4
Harry's South Pole Heroes	ITV
James Nesbitt's Ireland	ITV
Cooks' Questions	More 4
The Magaluf Weekender	ITV2
The Jump	Channel 4
Splash	ITV
The Hotel Inspector	Channel 5
Alex Polizzi: The Fixer	BBC Two
Educating the East End (third series)	Channel 4

=== 2013 ===
Title	Channel	Start date	No. of episodes	Running time
Educating Yorkshire (second series)	Channel 4	5 September 2013	8	60 minutes
Alex Polizzi's Christmas Fix	BBC Two	19 December 2013	1	60 minutes
Holiday Hit Squad	BBC One	6 February 2013	4	60 minutes
Country House Sunday	ITV	21 April 2013	21	60 minutes
Storage Hoarders (series 2)	ITV		30	60 minutes
Happy Families	ITV	2013	4	60 minutes
The 80s Greatest	National Geographic Channel	2013	4	60 minutes
Splash! (series 1)	ITV	5 January 2013	5	75 minutes
Choccywoccydoodah Star Challenge	Good Food	2013	10	60 minutes
Tropical Diseases	Discovery Channel	2013	6	60 minutes
The Body Shocking Show	E4	2013	8	30 minutes
James Nesbitt's Ireland	ITV	2013	10	30 minutes
Britain's Biggest Hoarders	BBC One	2013	3	60 minutes
The Magaluf Weekender	ITV2	6 January 2013	6	60 minutes
Cornwall with Caroline Quentin (series 2)	ITV	7 January 2013	10	30 minutes
Alex Polizzi: The Fixer (series 2)	BBC Two	12 February 2012	6	60 minutes

=== 2012 ===
Title	Channel	Start date	No. of episodes	Running time
A Night of Heroes: The Sun Military Awards	ITV	14 December 2012	1	90 minutes
Body Invaders	Discovery Channel	2012	6	60 minutes
Paddy's Show and Telly	ITV	22 December 2012	1	60 minutes
Holiday Home Sweet Home	ITV	2012	20	60 minutes
Storage Hoarders	ITV	2012	20	60 minutes
All Star Christmas Presents	Sky1	23 December 2012	1	90 minutes
The Secret Interview	Channel 5	2012	4	60 minutes
My Kidney and Me	More4	2012	1	30 minutes
Tom Daley: Diving for Britain	BBC One	23 July 2012	1	50 minutes
My Tasty Travels with Lynda Bellingham	ITV	2012	20	60 minutes
Harry's Mountain Heroes	ITV	2012	1	90 minutes
Bumps, Babies & Beyond	Discovery Real Time	2012	6	30 minutes
City Secrets	Sky Atlantic	2012	8	60 minutes
The Hotel Inspector (series 9)	Channel 5	2012	10	60 minutes
Britain's Biggest Hoarders	BBC One	2012	1	60 minutes
God Save the Queens	Sky Atlantic	2012	3	60 minutes
Be Your Own Boss	BBC Three	2012	6	60 minutes
British Cycling: Road to Glory	Sky Atlantic	20 August 2012	6	60 minutes
Bradley Wiggins – A Year in Yellow	Sky Atlantic	21 November 2012	1	90 minutes
The Angel	Sky1	2012	5	60 minutes
A Short History of Everything Else	Channel 4	2012	6	60 minutes
The Exclusives	ITV2	2012	7	60 minutes
Alex Polizzi: The Fixer (series 1)	BBC Two	31 January 2012	6	60 minutes
The Story of Musicals	BBC Four	2012	3	60 minutes
Cornwall with Caroline Quentin (series 1)	ITV	2 January 2012	8	30 minutes
Home of the Future	Channel 4	2012	5	60 minutes
Table Dancing Diaries	BBC Three	2012	1	60 minutes
Out on a Limo	Channel 4	2012	1	60 minutes

=== 2011 ===
Title	Channel	Start date	No. of episodes	Running time
A Night of Heroes	ITV	2011	1	90 minutes
Paddy's Show and Telly	ITV	29 December 2011	1	60 minutes
#tweetsoftheyear	ITV2	2011	1	90 minutes
So This Is Christmas	Channel 4	2011	1	60 minutes
Sealed Bid	Channel 4	2011	5	60 minutes
Tamara Ecclestone: Billion $$ Girl	Channel 5	2011	3	60 minutes
Harry's Arctic Heroes	BBC One	2011	2	60 minutes
My Hoarder Mum and Me	BBC One	2011	1	60 minutes
TA and the Taliban	Watch	2011	6	60 minutes
My Funniest Year	Channel 4	2011	4	120 minutes
Best of British	Channel 4	2011	10	60 minutes
Educating Essex	Channel 4	2011	7	60 minutes
The Hotel Inspector (series 7)	Channel 5	18 April 2011	8	60 minutes
The Hotel Inspector (series 8)	Channel 5	3 October 2011	8	60 minutes
Choccywoccydoodah	Good Food	2011	10	30 minutes
Graffiti Wars	Channel 4	2011	1	60 minutes
New Look Style the Nation	Channel 4	2011	6	60 minutes
Fisherman's Friends	Channel 4	2011	1	60 minutes
50 Greatest Wedding Shockers	E4	2011	1	120 minutes

=== 1998 ===
What would you do? | BBC One | 45 episodes | 30 minutes

== Awards ==
This Time Next Year was named the fastest selling format in the world in 2016, and secured a C21 award and a Realscreen Award.

The Real Marigold Hotel won a Rose d'Or award in 2016. The series was moved to BBC One for its second series.

Educating Yorkshire won a National Television Award, RTS Award, Broadcast Award for Best Documentary, IVCA Award, a BAFTA Craft award and two BAFTA Television nominations.

Twofour held the title Best Indie Production Company in 2010 and 2014, and secured 1st place in Televisual Magazine's True Indie Survey 2013.

The company has been awarded several IVCA and RTS awards. In 2013, triple BAFTA-nominated Educating Essex won a Broadcast Award for Best Documentary Series.
