= The Hotel Inspector =

British television series

- Title card from Series 4–11
- Genre: Documentary
- Starring: Ruth Watson (2005–08); Alex Polizzi (2008—present)
- Narrated by: Richard Vranch (2005); Mark Halliley (2006–2016); Alex Polizzi (2016—present)
- Country of origin: United Kingdom
- Original language: English
- No. of series: 21
- No. of episodes: 176 (list of episodes)

Production
- Running time: 60 minutes (inc. adverts)
- Production company: Twofour

Original release
- Network: Channel 5
- Release: 29 September 2005 – present

Related
- The Business Inspector; The Restaurant Inspector; Alex Polizzi: The Fixer

The Hotel Inspector is an observational documentary television series which is broadcast on the British terrestrial television station, Channel 5, and other networks around the world.

In each episode, celebrated hotelier and businesswoman Alex Polizzi visits a struggling British hotel to try to turn its fortunes around by giving advice and suggestions to the owner. The current host, Alex Polizzi (since 2008), has featured in nineteen series of The Hotel Inspector, including four series of The Hotel Inspector: Returns and one series of Hotel Inspector: Checking In, Checking Out. Her predecessor, Ruth Watson, presented four series between 2005 and 2008, including the first and only series of The Hotel Inspector: Revisited.

== Summary ==
The series began in late September 2005 and was an instant ratings hit; the show attracted 2.5 million viewers at its peak and this prompted Channel 5 to commission another series. The second series was broadcast in July 2006, followed by a third series in September 2007. The show won a Royal Television Society Award in November 2006.

Accompanied with the third series, an additional complementary series, The Hotel Inspector: Unseen ran on Fiver (now 5*), one of Channel 5's digital channels, immediately after the main show. It showed unseen footage, including video diaries shot by the hoteliers, revealing their reactions to the inspector's opinions.

After three series of The Hotel Inspector, Ruth Watson left a message on her website stating that she would not be filming another series, despite it being one of the channel's most watched shows. Watson subsequently signed an exclusive contract with Channel 4 and fronted shows such as Country House Rescue and Ruth Watson's Hotel Rescue (which is similar in format to The Hotel Inspector).

Hotelier and businesswoman Alex Polizzi, the niece of Sir Rocco Forte, took over as The Hotel Inspector for the show's fourth series, and has remained in this role since. Polizzi has also hosted five other series: the first in which she inspects and improves failing family businesses (BBC Two's The Fixer), a second and third in which she explores her ancestral Italy (Secret Italy and Italian Islands), a fourth in which she auditions head chefs for various hotels and restaurants (Chefs on Trial), and a fifth in which she finds employment for military veterans (Help Our Heroes).

Transmission of the twelfth series of the show began in June 2016. Use of a separate narrator was dropped with the commencement of this series, with Polizzi herself providing the voiceover narrative as well as talking directly to the viewer in segments filmed separately. Mark Halliley was nevertheless retained as narrator of The Hotel Inspector Returns, which followed series 12. The show's opening theme, titles, and on-screen graphics were also revised, with a notable new feature being the inclusion of a computer-generated smartphone graphic reproducing excerpts from each hotel's reviews as given on such websites as TripAdvisor, in order to establish possible reasons for the establishment's apparent unpopularity.

In June 2017, the programme returned for a thirteenth series, again hosted by Polizzi, with a new focus on high-end hotels. In September, Hotel Inspector: Checking in, Checking Out premiered on Channel 5 with the same format as The Hotel Inspector: Returns but with a new name. The following year, the fourteenth season of the show was broadcast on Channel 5 in July 2018.

Series 18 of The Hotel Inspector, returned with Polizzi for 6 episodes, which aired from October 2023.

== Spin-offs ==
The format of The Hotel Inspector has since been used twice for other series for Channel 5, both of which recreate the concept of an expert visiting and suggesting improvements for failing commercial ventures. In March 2010, The Business Inspector was broadcast, starring Hilary Devey, who advised struggling small businesses on how to become successful. In June 2011, The Restaurant Inspector was broadcast, starring Fernando Peire, who advised struggling restaurants on how to achieve higher profits, with a second series which broadcast in 2012.

== Streaming media releases ==
The 17 series of the programme are available for streaming online on FilmRise (who acquired the FAST rights to some television programmes from Twofour's parent, ITV Studios in North America) and its partnering AVOD services, Amazon Freevee and its sister SVOD service, Amazon Prime Video, Plex, The Roku Channel and Tubi in the United States and Canada.

Some series of the programme are also available for streaming online on the YouTube channel Taste (owned by ITV Studios) and 7plus in Australia.
