= Hotels in Saint Petersburg =

Saint Petersburg was constructed in 1703. The first hotel was built in 1719 on a place of Chicherin House in a Nevsky Prospekt 15. It was a Gostiny Dvor (Russian: Гостиный Двор), a gallery where merchants lived, stored the goods and traded in them.

The first modern hotel was opened in 1804 on Bolshaya Morskaya street 23/8. It was called the "Big hotel Paris" (Russian: Большая гостиница Париж). In 1821, regulations governing "hotels, restaurants, coffee houses, and taverns" were introduced.

== List of hotels ==
- Angleterre Hotel (opened in 1991, 1876-1911 – Hotel Schmidt-Angleterre)
- Astoria (opened in 1912)
- Corinthia Hotel (opened in 1993, formerly the Nevskij Palace Hotel)
- Four Seasons Hotel Lion Palace (opened in 2013)
- Grand Hotel Europe (opened in 1875)
- Novotel Saint Petersburg Centre (opened in 2005)
- Oktyabrskaya Hotel (opened in 1851, Znamenskaya Hotel until 1887, Great Northern until 1930)
- Saint Petersburg Hotel (opened in 1970)

== See also ==
- List of buildings and structures in Saint Petersburg
