= Teahouse =

Cafe-type business serving tea

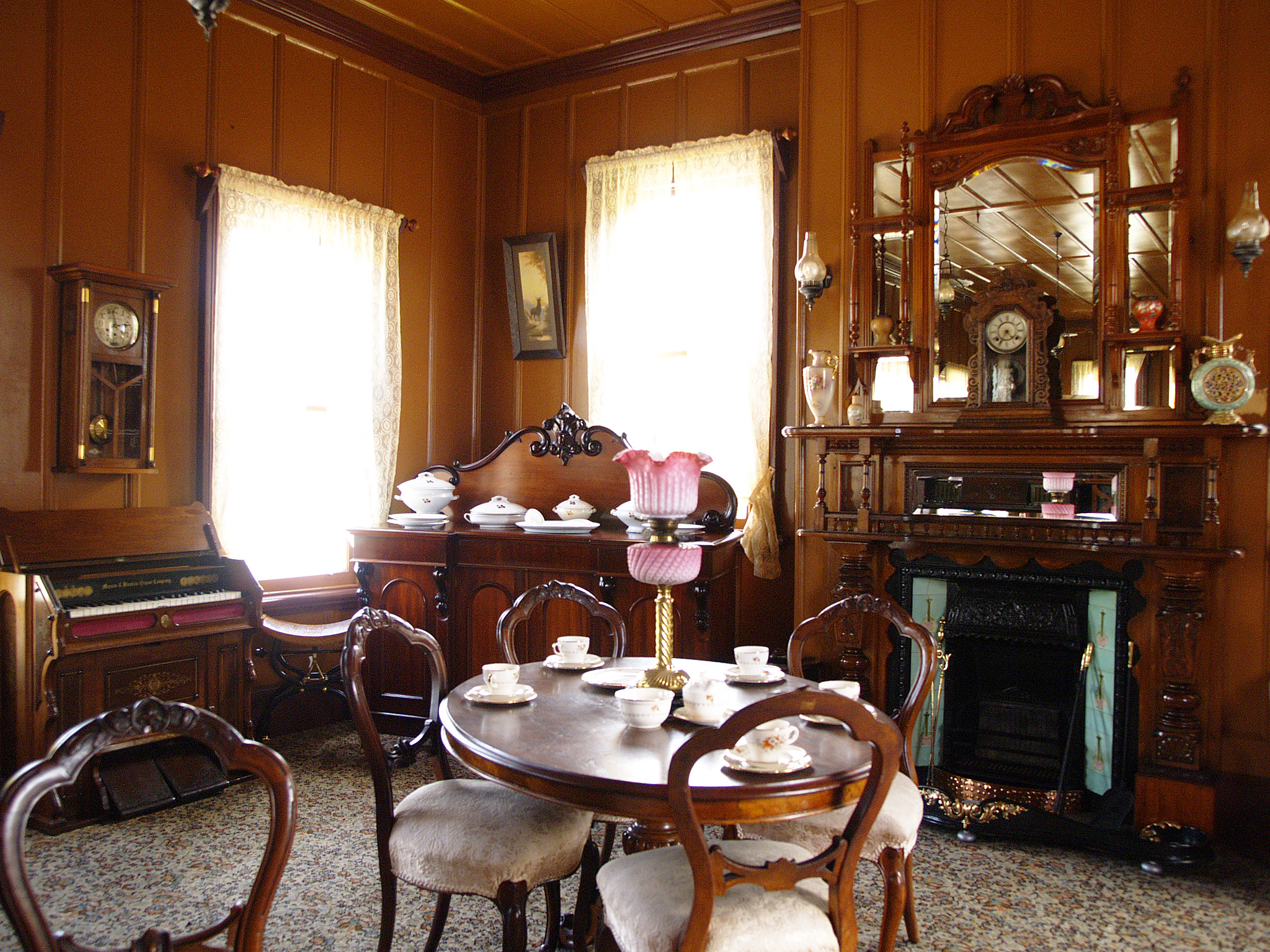
Tea served in a tea room at the Shantytown Heritage Park in New Zealand

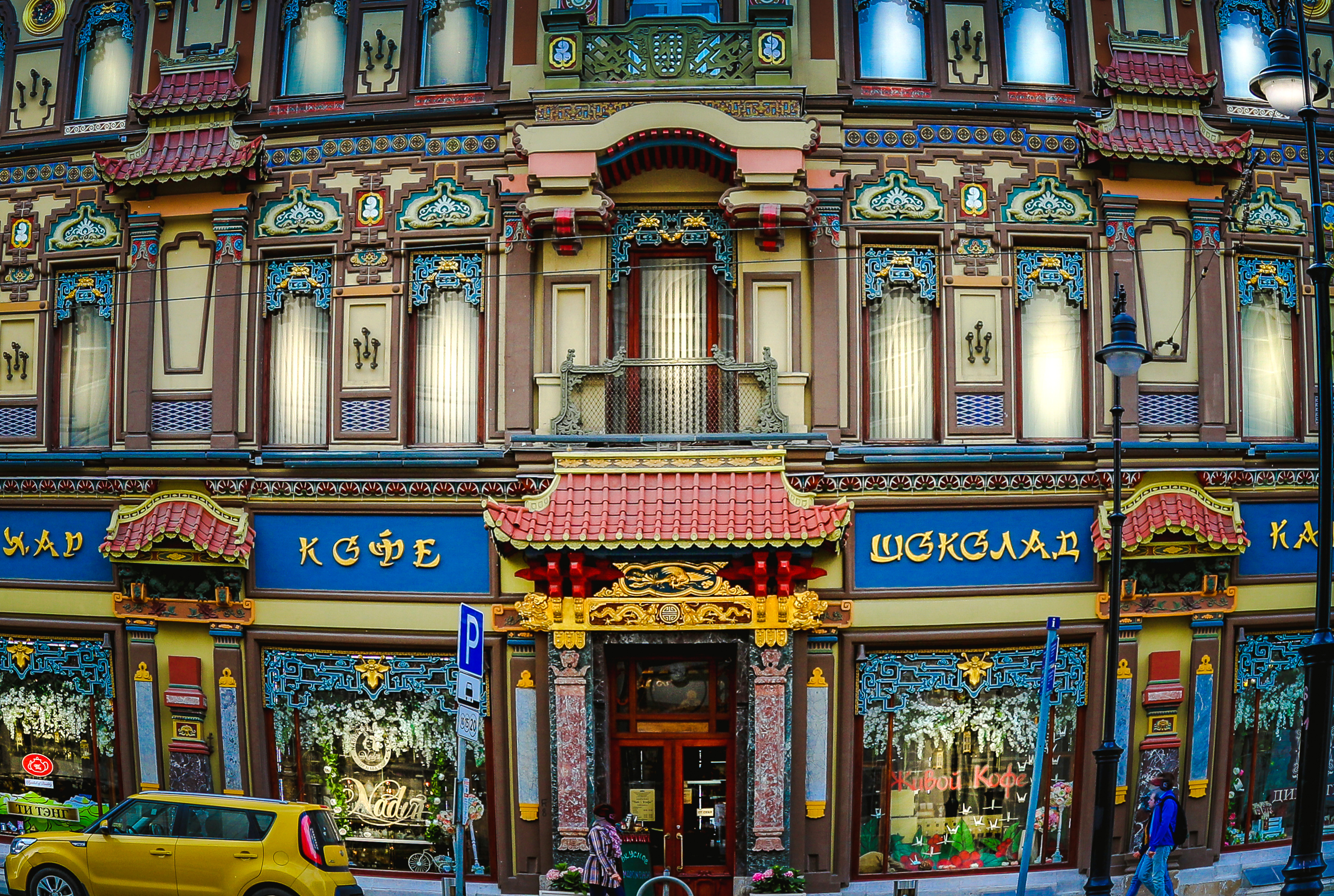
Tea house in Moscow, 2017

A teahouse or tearoom (also tea room) is an establishment which primarily serves tea and other light refreshments. A tea room may be a room set aside in a hotel, especially for serving afternoon tea, or may be an establishment that only serves cream tea. Although the function of a tea room may vary according to the circumstance or country, tea houses often serve as centers of social interaction, like coffee houses.

Some cultures have a variety of distinct tea-centered establishments of different types, depending on the national tea culture. For example, British tea rooms often serve afternoon tea with a variety of small snacks.

== East Asia ==
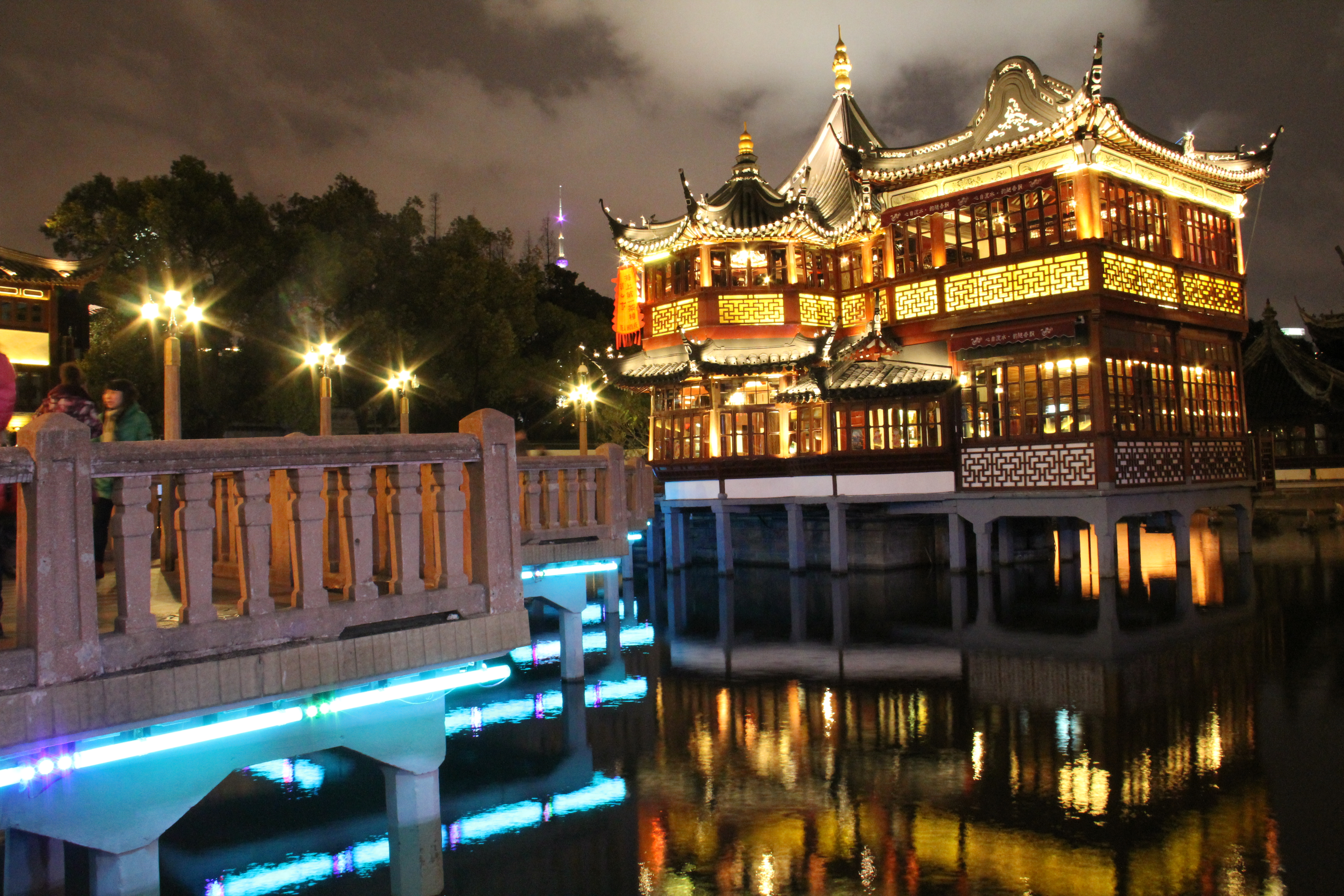
A teahouse at night in Yu Yuan Garden, Shanghai

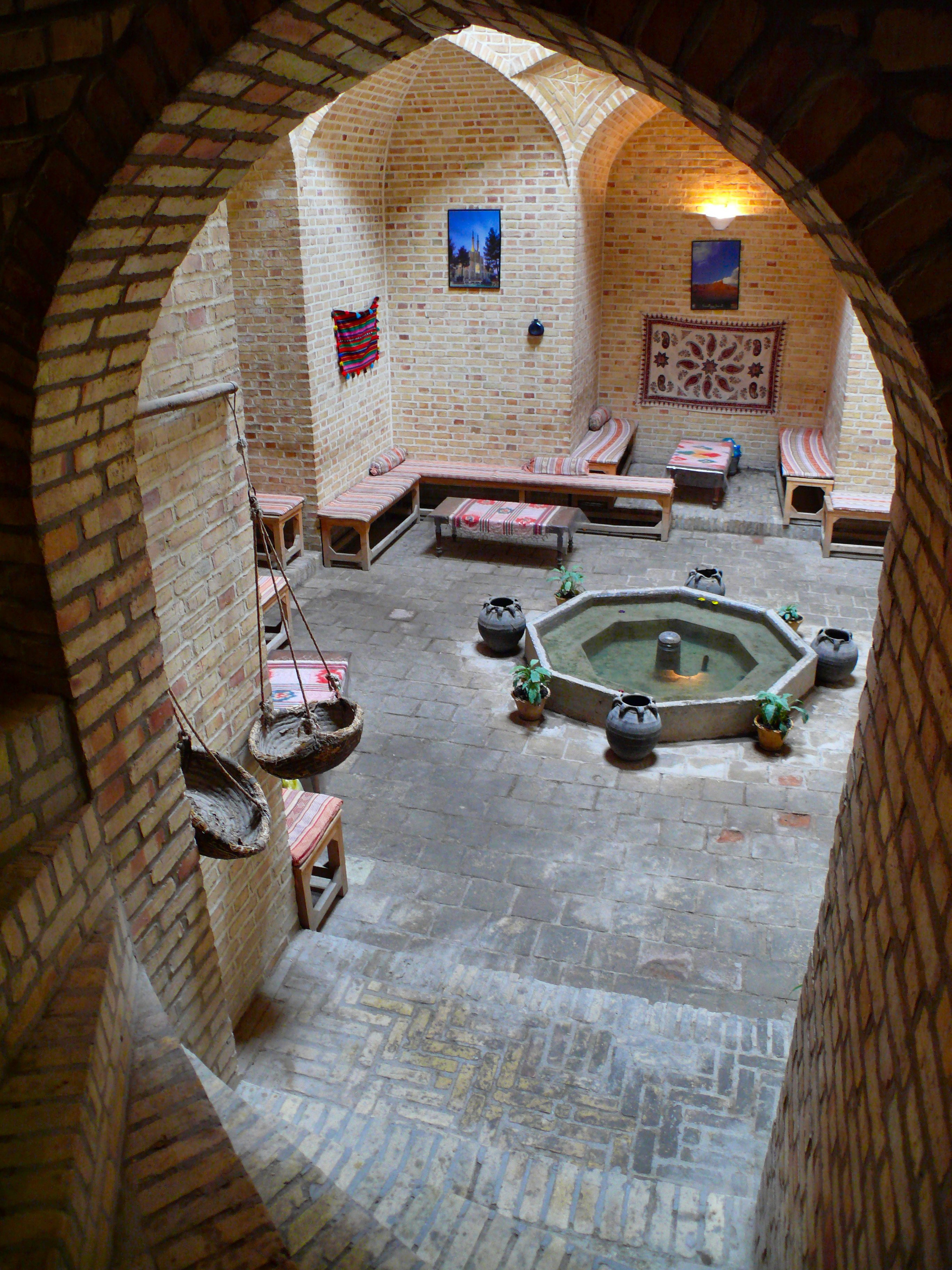
A chaikhaneh (teahouse) in Yazd

Throughout East Asia, a teahouse (Chinese: 茶館, cháguăn or 茶屋, cháwū; Japanese: chaya (茶屋); Standard Nepali: chiya ghar (चिया घर)) is traditionally a place which offers tea to its customers. People gather at teahouses to chat, socialize and drink tea, and young people often meet at teahouses for dates. The Guangdong (Cantonese) style teahouse is particularly famous outside of China, especially in Nepal's Himalayas. These teahouses, called caa4 lau4 (茶樓) serve dim sum (點心), and these small plates of food are consumed alongside tea.

Before tea was used as a social drink, Buddhist monks drank it to aid their meditation. During the Chinese adaptation of Buddhism between 200 C.E. and 850 C.E., tea was introduced as a medicinal herb. It was then evolved to assist Buddhist monks in their meditation by providing the energy needed to stay awake (likely via the effects of caffeine as a stimulant on the brain). Soon after that, tea was popularized as a commonplace beverage, replacing the previously consumed milk- and water-based beverages and Chinese teahouses provided a new kind of social life for the Chinese during the 8th–9th centuries C.E.

According to Japanese cultural tradition, a teahouse ordinarily refers to a private structure designed for holding Japanese tea ceremonies. This structure and specifically the room in it where the tea ceremony takes place is called chashitsu (茶室, literally "tea room"). The architectural space called chashitsu was created for aesthetic and intellectual fulfillment.

During the Edo period, the term "teahouse" came to refer to the place where geisha would entertain their clients or as a place where couples seeking privacy could go. In this case, the establishment was referred to as an ochaya, literally meaning "tea house"; however, these establishments only served tea incidentally. Though the usage of the term chaya for teahouses in the modern sense is now considered archaic—with modern tearooms known as kissaten, serving tea as well as coffee—the term ochaya is still used in Kyoto to refer to the establishments where geisha perform and entertain clients.

== Southeast Asia ==
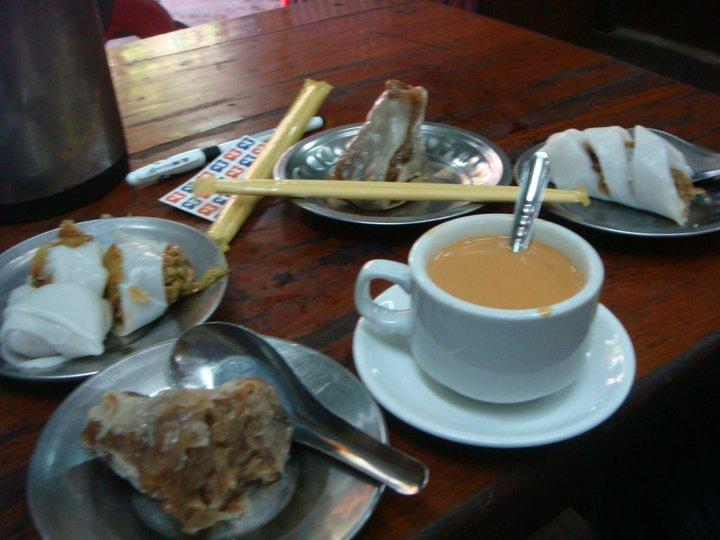
Burmese tea house accompaniments

In Myanmar, teahouses known as laphetyay saing (လက်ဖက်ရည်ဆိုင်), formerly known as kaka saing (ကာကာဆိုင်), are a staple of urban centers throughout the country. These teahouses, which first emerged during the British colonial era, serve milk tea and a variety of delicacies ranging from native dishes like mohinga to Indian fritters (such as paratha and puri) or Chinese pastries (such as baozi and youtiao). Tea shops have traditionally served as venues akin to conversational salons.

== South Asia ==
In Pakistan, the prominent Pak Tea House is an intellectual tea–café located in Lahore known as the hub of Progressive Writers' Movement.

== Central and West Asia ==
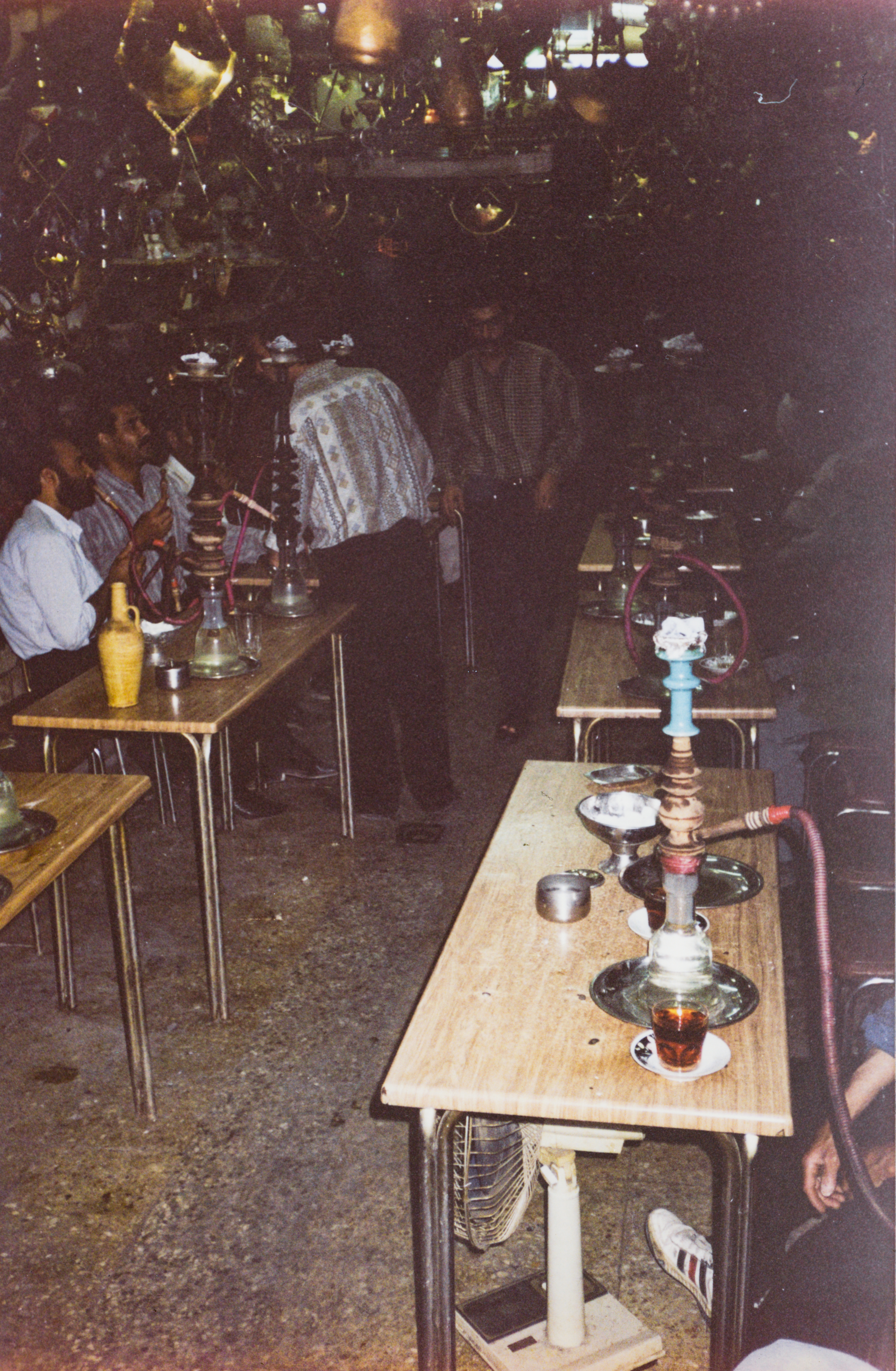
Chaikhaneh in Isfahan, Iran, 1999

In Central Asia, the term "teahouse" refers to several variations on teahouses found in different countries; these include the shayhana in Kazakhstan, chaykhana in Kyrgyzstan and choyxona in Uzbekistan, all of which translate as "a tea room". In Tajikistan, the largest teahouses are the Orient Teahouse, Chinese Teahouse, and Orom Teahouse in the city of Isfara. On the 15th anniversary of the independence of Tajikistan, the people of Isfara presented the Isfara Teahouse to the city of Kulyab for its 2,700th anniversary in September 2006. Teahouses are present in other parts of West Asia, notably in Iran, Azerbaijan and also Turkey. Such teahouses may be referred to, in Persian, as چایخانه, chaikhaneh, in Azerbaijani, as çayxana, or in Turkish, çayhane – literally, the "tea house". These teahouses usually serve several other beverages and shisha in addition to tea.

In Arab countries such as Egypt, establishments that serve tea, coffee and herbal teas like hibiscus tea are referred to as ahwa or maqha (مقهى) and are more commonly translated into English as "coffeehouse".

== Europe ==
=== Britain ===
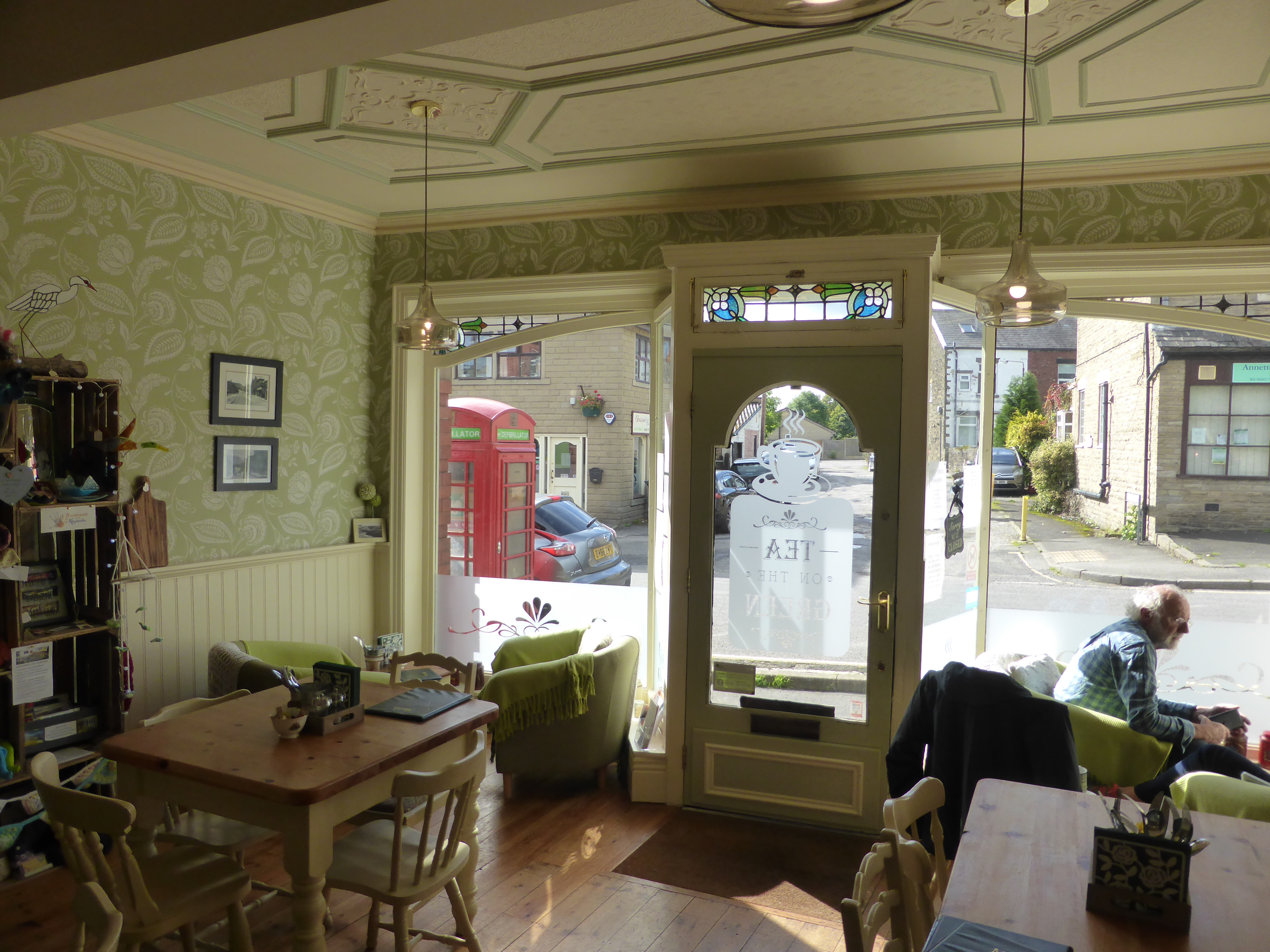
A tea shop in England

Tea drinking is a pastime closely associated with the English. A female manager of London's Aerated Bread Company is credited with creating the bakery's first public tearoom in 1864, which became a thriving chain. Tea rooms were part of the growing opportunities for women in the Victorian era.

In the UK today, a tea room is a small room or restaurant where beverages and light meals are served, often having a sedate or subdued atmosphere. The food served can range from a cream tea (also known as Devonshire tea), i.e., a scone with jam and clotted cream; to an elaborate afternoon tea featuring tea sandwiches and small cakes; to a high tea, a savoury meal. In Scotland, teas are usually served with a variety of scones, pancakes, crumpets, and other cakes. There is a long tradition of tea rooms within London hotels, for example, at Brown's Hotel at 33 Albemarle Street, which has been serving tea in its tea room for over 170 years.

In a related usage, a tea room may be a room set aside in a workplace for relaxation and eating during tea breaks. Traditionally this was served by a tea lady, not to be confused with a dinner lady.

==== Commonwealth ====
Tea rooms are popular in Commonwealth countries, particularly Canada, with its harsh winters when afternoon tea is popular. The menu will generally have similar foods to the UK, but with the addition sometimes of butter tarts or other small desserts like nanaimo bars or pets de sœurs. Tea is commonly consumed in other Commonwealth countries alone or in the British fashion.

=== Elsewhere ===
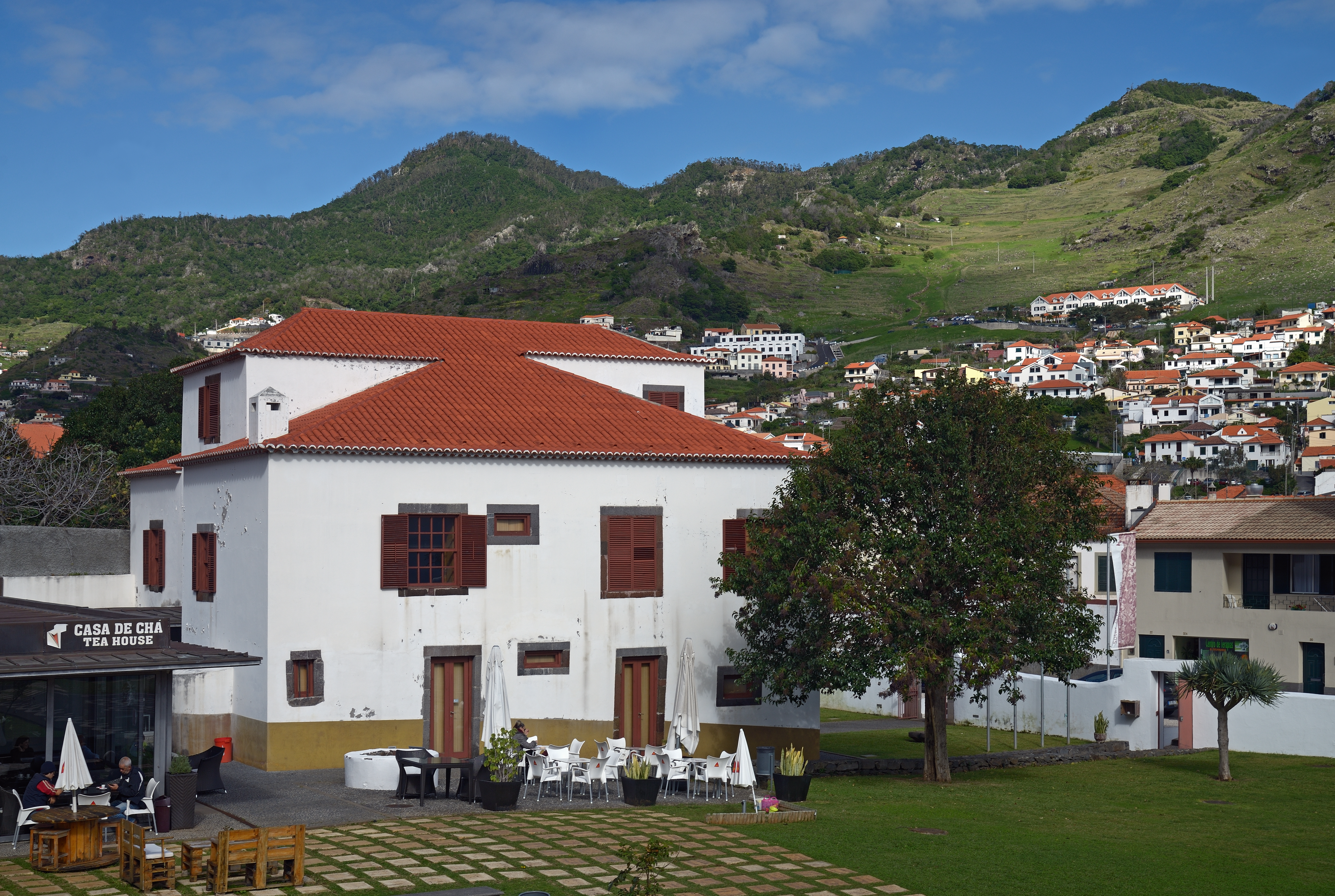
Tea house in winter. Machico, Madeira, Portugal

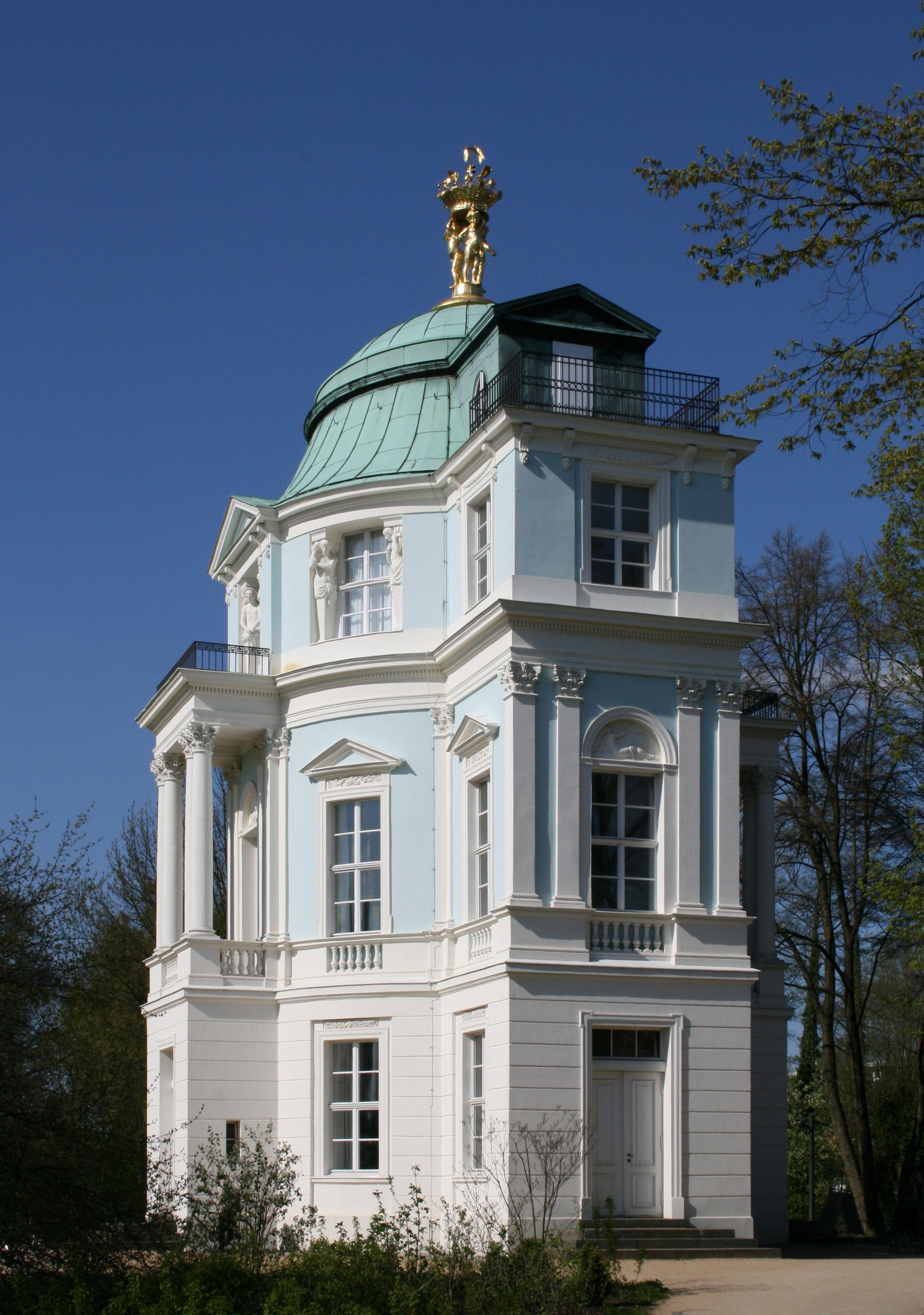
End view of the teahouse "belvedere" of the Charlottenburg Palace, Berlin

In France, a tea room is called Salon de thé, and pastries and cakes are served. It seems that having a separate teahouse was a tradition in many European countries.

In the Czech Republic, the tea room culture has been spreading since the Velvet Revolution of 1989 and today, there are nearly 400 tea rooms (čajovny) in the country (more than 50 just in Prague), which is according to some sources Europe's largest concentration of tea rooms per capita.

In Kosovo, there are teahouses known as "çajtore".

Germany also has a tea room tradition, particularly in regions such as East Frisia, where tea culture is an important part of local identity.

== Relationship to 19th-century temperance movement ==
The popularity of the tea room rose as an alternative to the pub in the UK and US during the temperance movement in the 1830s. The form developed in the late nineteenth century, as Catherine Cranston opened the first of what became a chain of Miss Cranston's Tea Rooms in Glasgow, Scotland, and similar establishments became popular throughout Scotland. In the 1880s, fine hotels in both the United States and England began to offer tea service in tea rooms and tea courts, and by 1910 they had begun to host afternoon tea dances as dance crazes swept both the US and the UK. Tea rooms of all kinds were widespread in Britain by the 1950s. In the following decades, cafés became more fashionable, and tea rooms became less common.

== Other meanings and related words ==
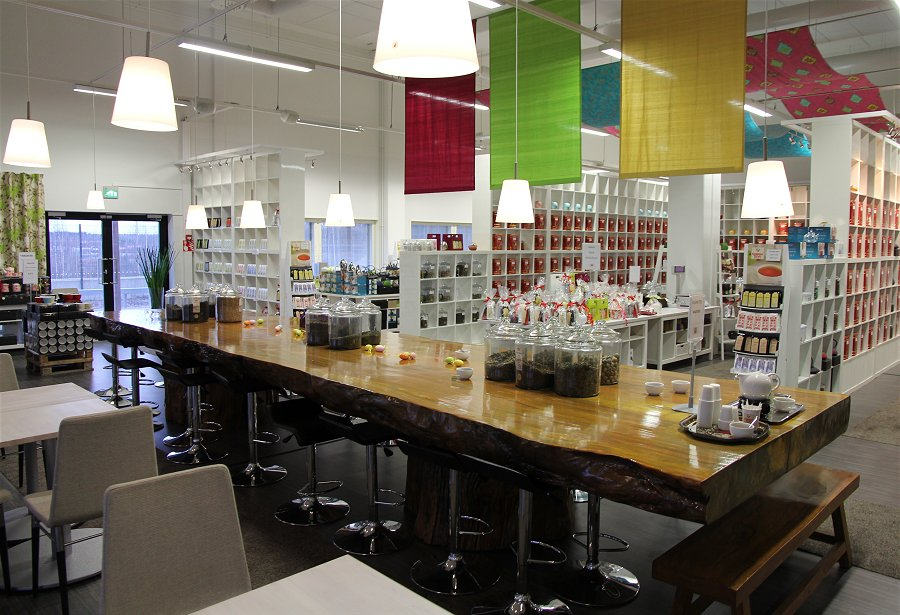
Forsman Tea, the largest tea shop in Finland in terms of sales volume, located in Vantaa

The term "tea shop" may also refer to a retail shop selling dry tea to take home. Dry tea (first, as loose leaves, and then in teabags) used to be sold at grocers' shops, and now mainly at supermarkets. One of the oldest shops that still specialises in selling tea for consumption at home is Twinings, which has been operating from the same premises in central London since it opened in 1706. In South African English, "tearoom" is a synonym for "café" or small local grocer's shop.

In the workplace, the term tea room ("break room" in North America) is a room set aside for employees to relax, specifically a work break refreshment. Traditionally, a staff member serving hot drinks and snacks at a factory or office was called a tea lady, although this position is now almost defunct.

Tea is a prominent feature of British culture and society. For centuries, Britain has been one of the world's greatest tea consumers, and now consumes an average per capita of 1.9 kg (4.18 lbs) per year.

== See also ==
- List of tea houses
- Public house
  - List of public house topics

=== Eating establishments ===
- Cha chaan teng, Hong Kong eating establishments (literally "tea restaurant")
- Coffeehouse
- Dabang (Korea), the Korean word for such establishments
- Nakamal, a traditional meeting place in Vanuatu, where kava is drunk

=== Other ===
- Tea garden, see pleasure garden
- Teahouse scam, a type of fraud
- The Teahouse of the August Moon, a novel and works derived from it
- Yum cha – "going for dim sum", a sort of Cantonese brunch
- Tea ceremony
