= The Charles Hotel =

Luxury hotel in Munich, Germany

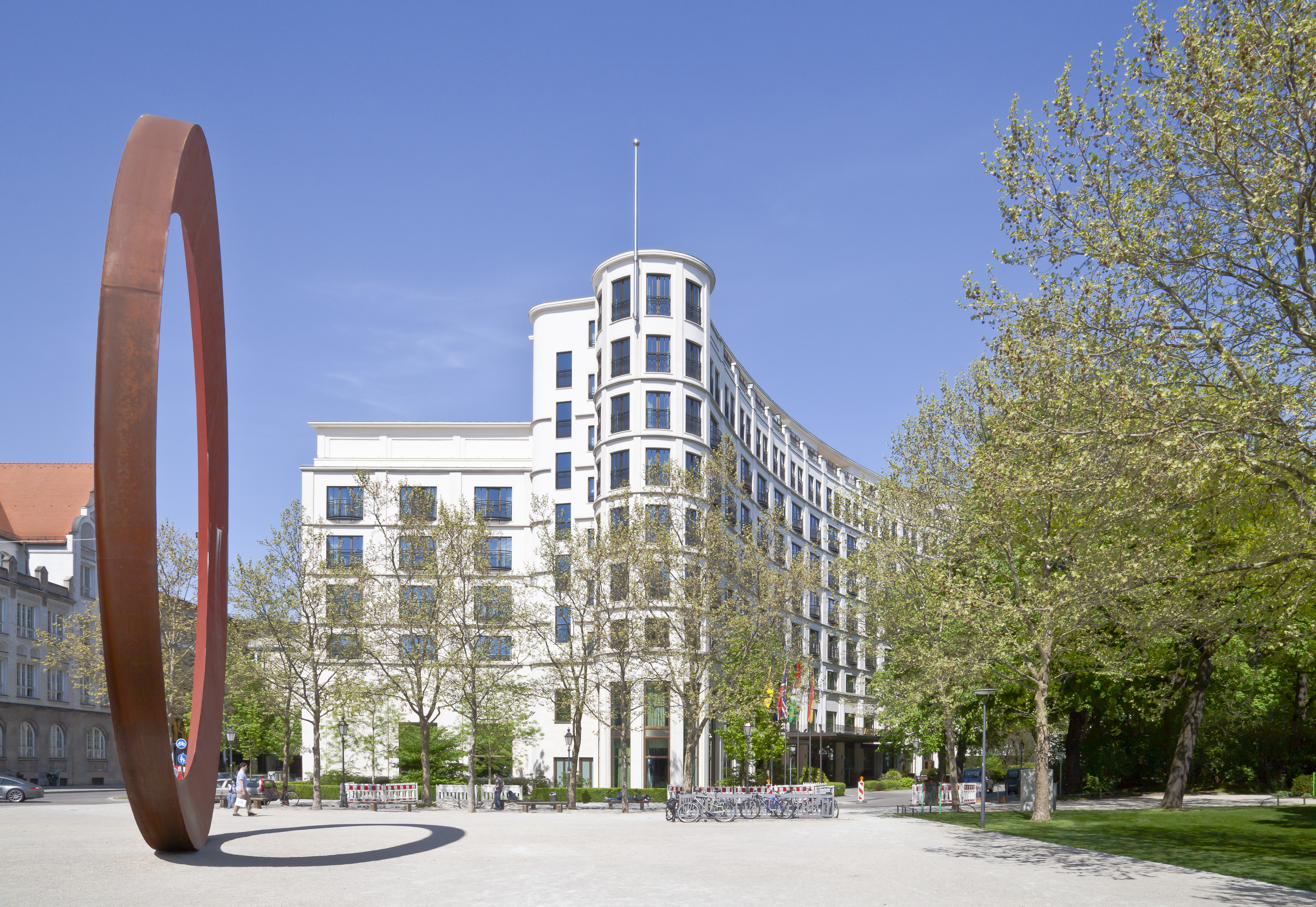
- Interactive map of the The Charles Hotel area

General information
- Type: Luxury hotel
- Classification: _{Superior}
- Location: Munich, Bavaria, Germany, Sophienstrasse 28, Maxvorstadt
- Coordinates: 48°8′34″N 11°33′45″E
- Opened: 2007
- Affiliation: The Leading Hotels of the World

Other information
- Number of rooms: 160

Website
- Official website

The Charles Hotel is a luxury hotel located at Sophienstrasse 28 in the Maxvorstadt borough of Munich in Bavaria, Germany. It was built in 2007 at the old botanical garden near the main train station.

The hotel is operated by Rocco Forte & Family (Munich) GmbH, which belongs to the British group Rocco Forte Hotels. The hotel is part of the Lenbachgärten. The hotel has 160 guest rooms (including 28 suites), a meeting area, a large ballroom for 300 guests, a restaurant, several bars and a swimming pool.

The eight-storey building was built in the Art Deco style by the Berlin architects Hilmer & Sattler und Albrecht. Construction began on 1 June 2005 and was completed on 1 July 2007. The architecture has won several awards, including the Villegiature Award for "Best Hotel Architecture in Europe" in 2008 and the "German Natural Stone Award ".
