= Rocco Forte Hotels =

British hospitality company

- Industry: Hospitality
- Founded: 1996; 30 years ago
- Founders: Sir Rocco Forte; Olga Polizzi
- Headquarters: London, England
- Key people: Sir Rocco Forte, Chairman; Olga Polizzi, Director of Design
- Services: Hotels
- Owners: Forte family (51%); Public Investment Fund (49%)
- Number of employees: 2,470 (2024)
- Website: www.roccofortehotels.com

Rocco Forte Hotels is a British hotel group that was established in 1996 by hotelier Sir Rocco Forte and his sister, Olga Polizzi. The group owns and operates 14 hotels across Europe. Sir Rocco Forte is Executive Chairman, while Olga Polizzi is Deputy Chairman and Director of Design. As of April 2024, the group employed 2,470 people.

== History ==
Following the takeover of the Forte Group by Granada plc in 1996, Sir Rocco Forte and Olga Polizzi (the children of hotel magnate Lord Forte) formed RF Hotels. The rights to the Forte name were initially lost in 1996, when Granada plc bought the Forte Group. The first hotel purchased by the newly formed company in 1997 was a former Forte Group hotel, The Balmoral Hotel in Edinburgh, which had been put up for sale by new owners Granada plc.

In 2001, following the de-merger of Compass Group from Granada's media interests, the use of the Forte trademark was returned to Sir Rocco Forte in a gesture intended to dispel the bitter legacy of the takeover. In 2003, the company changed its name to Rocco Forte Hotels, then The Rocco Forte Collection on 29 July 2007. The group name reverted to Rocco Forte Hotels in 2011.

The group's sales offices are located in London, Rome, Frankfurt, Moscow, Madrid, New York City and Los Angeles. As a brand of Rocco Forte Hotels Limited, the group owns and manages luxury five-star hotels. Brown's Hotel, Hotel de Rome and Hotel Amigo are members of The Leading Hotels of the World.

In December 2023, the company announced the sale of a minority stake of 49% to Saudi Arabia's Public Investment Fund. The deal valued the business at £1.4 billion.

In August 2024, the hotel group announced the expansion of five new hotels across Europe.

== Properties ==
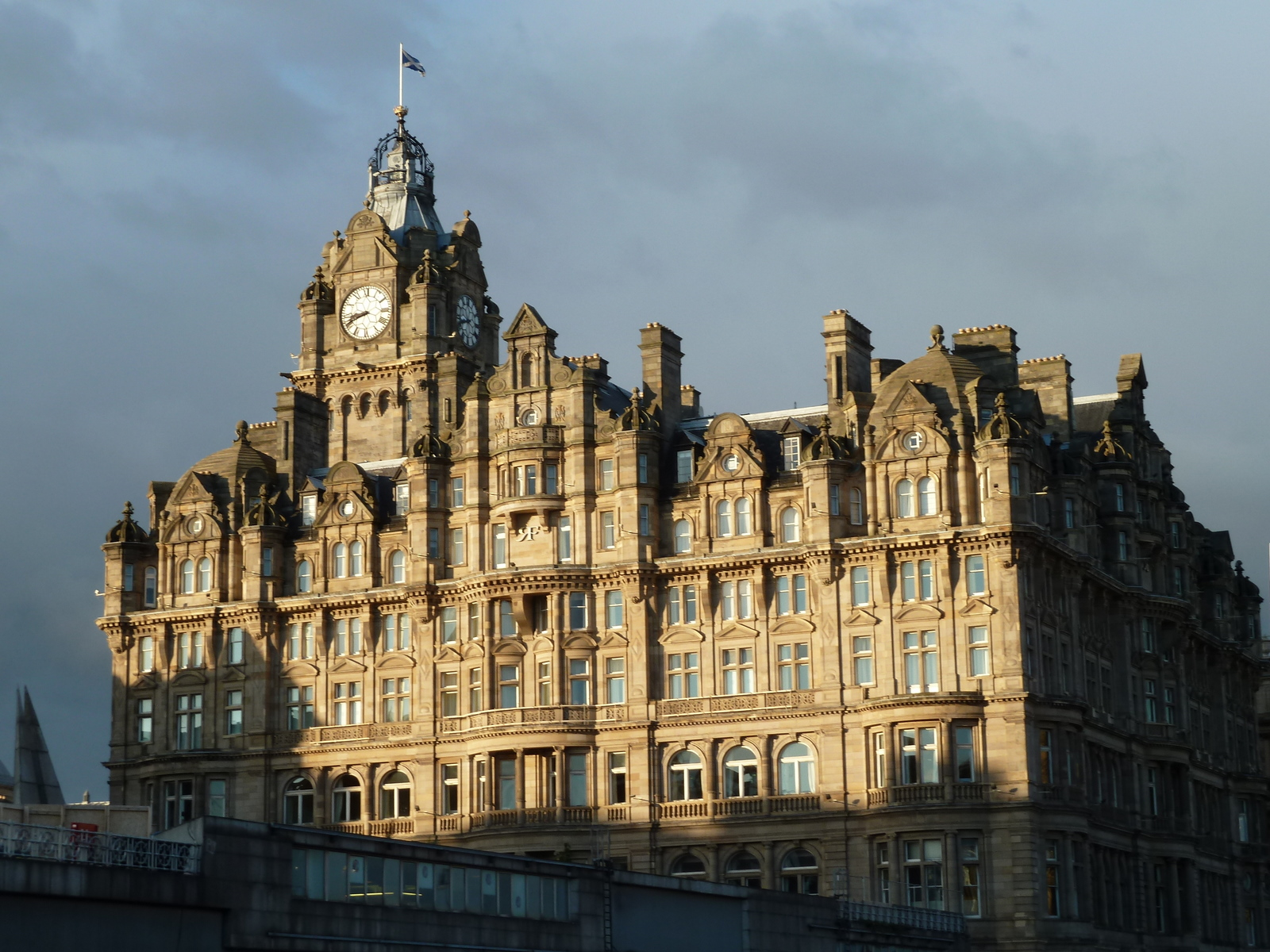
Balmoral Hotel in Edinburgh

=== Current hotels ===
- Balmoral Hotel, Edinburgh – 1997
- Hotel Savoy, Florence – 1997
- Hotel Astoria, St Petersburg – 1999
- Hotel Amigo, Brussels – 2000
- Hotel de Russie, Rome – 2000
- Brown's Hotel, London – 2003
- The Charles Hotel, Munich – 2007
- Verdura Resort, Sicily – 2009
- Masseria Torre Maizza, Apulia – 2019
- Hotel de la Ville, Rome – 2019
- Villa Igiea, Palermo – 2020

=== Affiliated properties ===
- Angleterre Hotel in St. Petersburg, Russia, is also owned by Rocco Forte & Family PLC but is not part of Rocco Forte Hotels.
- Hotel Endsleigh in the Tamar Valley, England and Hotel Tresanton in St. Mawes, England, are privately owned by Sir Rocco Forte's sister, Olga Polizzi.

=== Former locations ===
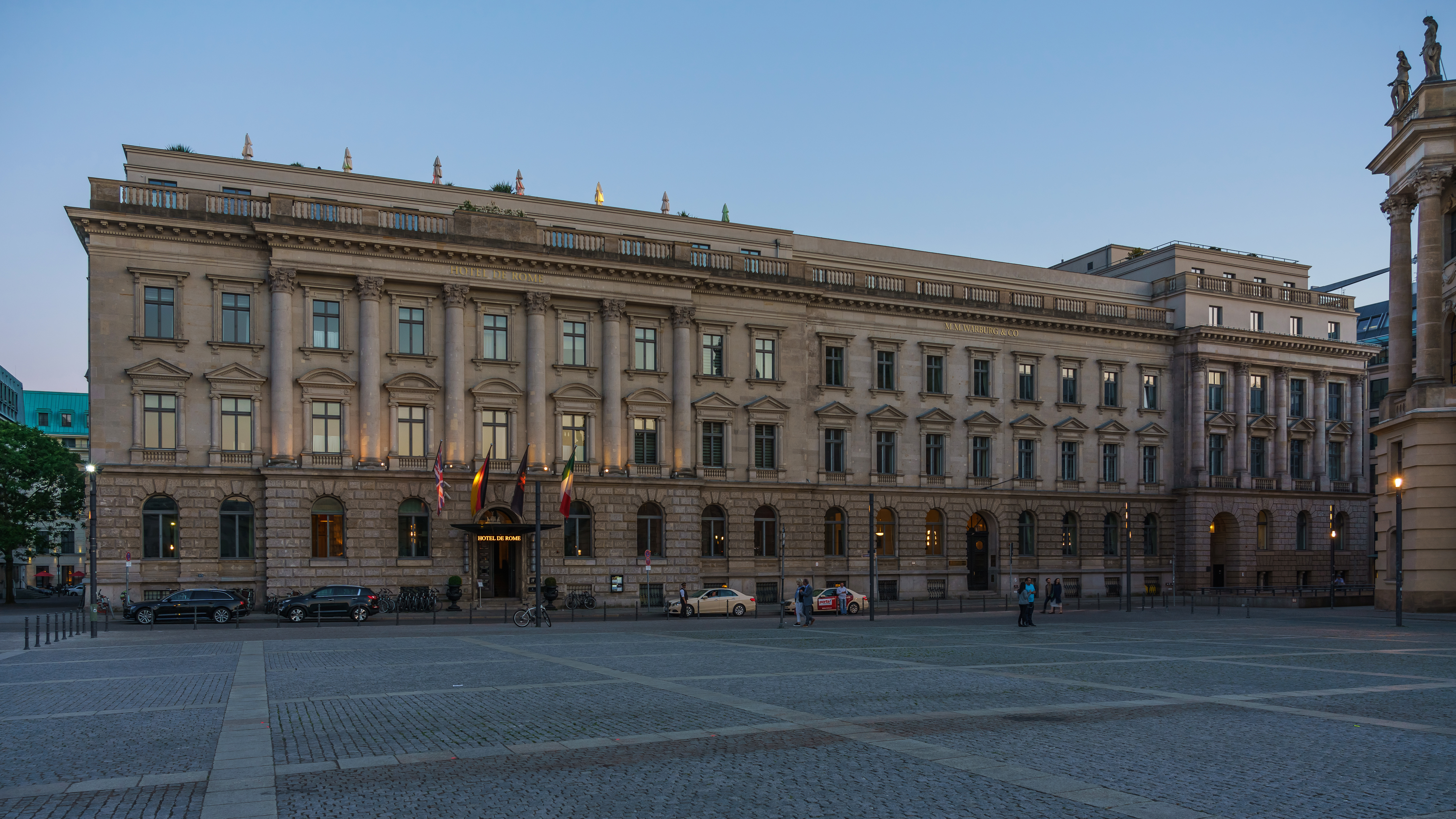
Hotel de Rome in Berlin

- Chateau de Bagnols (Beaujolais, France) - sold in 2007 to Von Essen Hotels
- St David's Hotel & Spa (Cardiff, Wales) - sold in 2007 to Principal Hayley Group
- The Augustine Hotel (Prague, Czech Republic) - management reverted to the owner in 2013, currently managed by Marriott International under its Luxury Collection brand.
- Rocco Forte's hotel in Abu Dhabi also changed management in 2013, initially to become the independent Al Maqta Hotel but later the Hilton Capital Grand Abu Dhabi.
- Villa Kennedy in Frankfurt am Main, Germany – 2006 to 2022; reopening in 2025 as The Florentin
- Lowry Hotel in Salford, Manchester. First 5-star hotel in Manchester. Sold in 2016.
- Hotel de Rome in Berlin – 2006 to 2025; reopening in 2027 as Four Seasons Hotel
