= Alexei Pokotilov =

Russian terrorist (1879–1904)

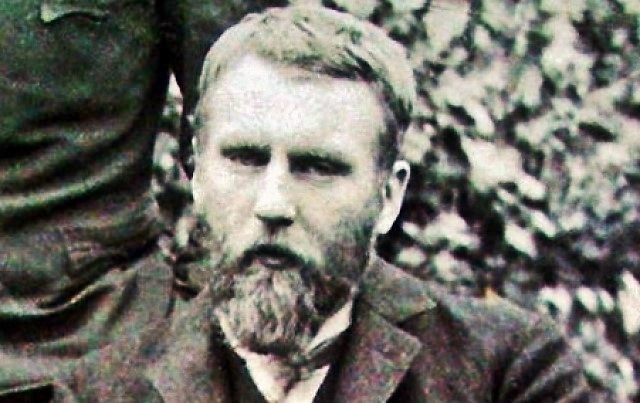
- Born: 1879
- Died: April 1, 1904 (aged 24–25); Saint-Petersburg

Alexei Dmitrievich Pokotilov (Russian: Алексе́й Дми́триевич Покоти́лов; 1879–1904) was an Eser, terrorist, a member of the Combat Organization of the Socialist Revolutionary Party, and one of the participants in the assassination of The Minister of Internal Affairs Vyacheslav von Plehve.

== Biography ==
Alexei Pokotilov belonged to a noble family. His father was a major general. He studied at the Kyiv University.

In 1901, he was deported under police supervision for 2 years due to participation in a demonstration near the Kazan Cathedral in Saint Petersburg. Pokotilov lived in Poltava, from where he managed to escape.

On the night of April 1, 1904, he died in an explosion at the Northern Hotel, Saint Petersburg.
