= Embassy of Germany, Saint Petersburg =

Former embassy building in St. Petersburg, Russia

Former German Embassy in Saint Petersburg
- Посольство Германии в Санкт-Петербурге (Russian)
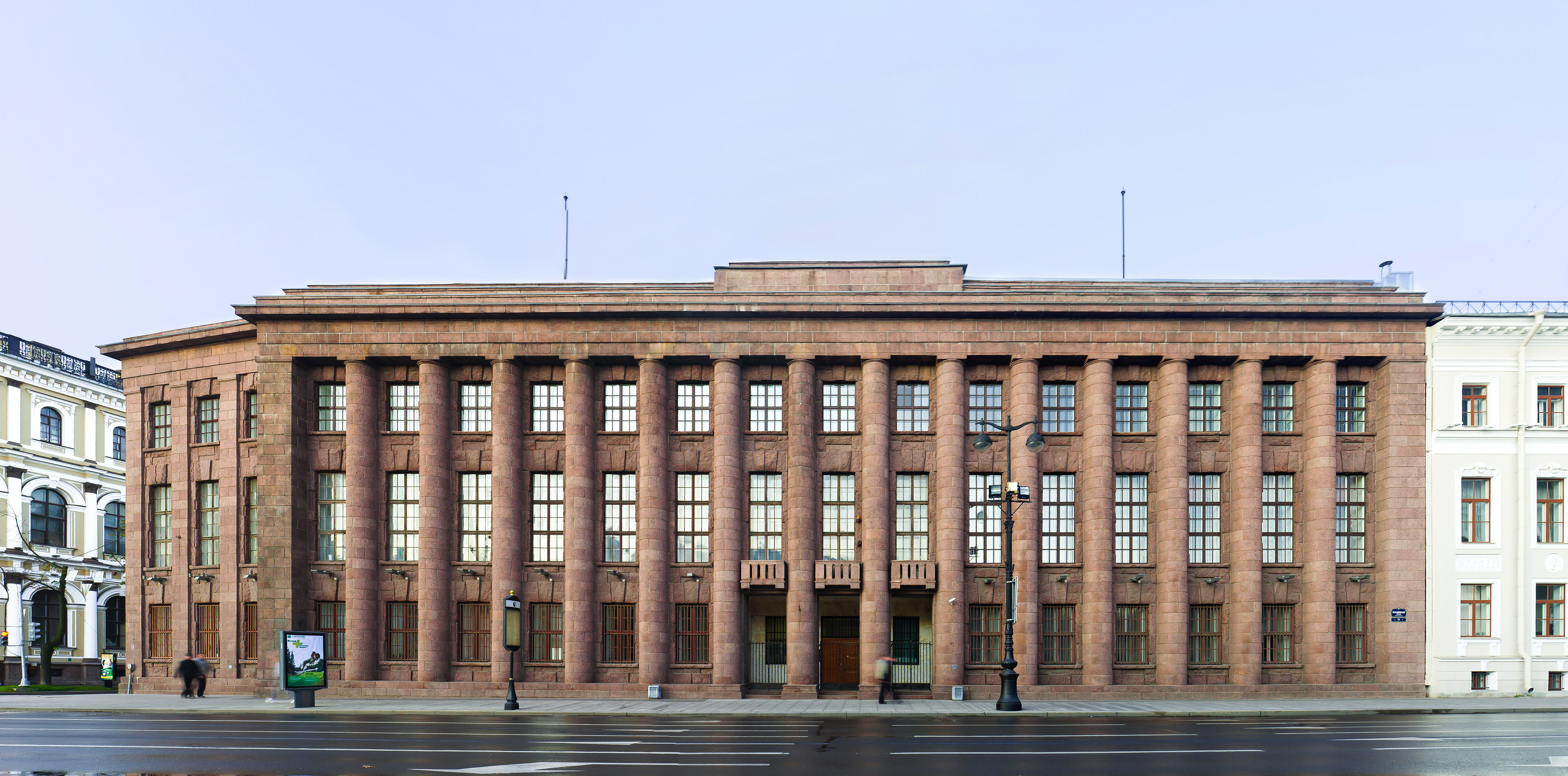
- Interactive map of Former German Embassy in Saint Petersburg
- 59°55′57″N 30°18′24″E
- Location: 11/41 Saint Isaac's Square

History
- Built: 1911–1913

Site notes
- Architect: Peter Behrens

The former Embassy of Germany in Saint Petersburg is considered the earliest and most influential example of Stripped Classicism. Designed by Peter Behrens, it was built to house the diplomatic mission of the German Empire in Saint Petersburg, the capital of the Russian Empire. After the relocation by the Bolsheviks of the Soviet capital from Petrograd (as Saint Petersburg was then known) to Moscow, it served as a consulate of the Weimar Republic and Nazi Germany. Located at 11/41 Saint Isaac's Square (Russian: Исаакиевская площадь, дом 11/41) in the Tsentralny District of Saint Petersburg, the building now houses the offices of two Russian government agencies.

== History of the site ==
In the 1740s, a two-storey building was erected by Nikita Shestakov on the site which is today at 11/41 Saint Isaac's Square. In 1743 Shestakov sold the building to merchant Fedot Stepanov and from the 1760s to 1812 it was owned by a jeweller to the court of the Russian Empire. From 1815 to 1820, renowned Russian architect Vasily Stasov redesigned the house in the Empire style common in Russia during this period.

In 1832, General-Adjutant Pavel Konstantinovich Aleksandrov, the illegitimate son of Grand Duke Konstantin Pavlovich, purchased the building and lived there with his wife Anna Alexandrovna. The couple regularly held balls in the residence, with frequent visitors including Alexander Pushkin. The house was passed onto their daughter, Princess Alexandra Pavlovna Lvova, wife of Prince Dmitry Aleksandrovich Lvov, and between 1870 and 1871 the facade of the building was designed in Eclectic style by Ferdinand Müller.

== German Embassy ==
In 1873, the German Ambassador declared an intention to acquire the building from Princess Lvova and the building was bought by the German Empire for housing the German Embassy to the Russian Empire that same year. The Germans commissioned architect Rudolf Bernhard to redecorate the buildings interiors, and in 1889 Ivan Schlupp redesigned the building by adding a second floor over a part of the facade on Bolshaya Morskaya Street.

In 1911–1913 the building was again redesigned, this time in Neoclassical style by German architect Peter Behrens, as a grandiose monument to the power of a unified Germany. Behrens' design, which Albert Speer reported Adolf Hitler admired, saw the facade of the building being built in red granite, the frontispiece, reminiscent of Ancient Greek architecture, was completed with 14 columns, and decorated with pilasters. Ludwig Mies van der Rohe served as construction manager on the project, and sculptor Eberhard Enke created the Castor and Pollux sculpture, symbolising the reunion of the German nation, which adorned the tympanum. Other prominent German masters created paintings, sculptures and fretwork to adorn the building. The embassy building was officially opened on 14 January 1913.

The artistic community in Saint Petersburg held negative opinions of the building, with prominent members of the community, Alexandre Benois, Nikolay Wrangel and Georgy Lukomsky, criticising the Teutonic style of the building as being hostile to the architectural style of the city, and due to it differing greatly from the Russian neoclassical revival style.

It was rumoured at the time that the embassy was linked to the German–owned Hotel Astoria via a tunnel, and on 1–2 August 1914, after Germany declared war on Russia, crowds stormed the building as anti-German sentiment took hold in the city. The building sustained considerable damage, with crowds torching the throne room of Kaiser Wilhelm II, destroying Greek and Italian art work and a collection of Sèvres porcelain. The Dioskouroi sculpture from the roof disappeared during this time, and rumours abounded that it was dumped in the Moika River by the crowd, however, researchers have been unable to find any fragments of the sculpture in the river.

After the war, the Germans returned to the city in 1922, at the time known as Petrograd, and operated a consulate from the building, representing the Weimar Republic and later Nazi Germany, until 1939. During the Siege of Leningrad, the Red Army operated a hospital in the premises, and after the Great Patriotic War it housed the Institute of Semiconductor Physics. Later tenants of the building have included Intourist, Dresdner Bank and the Committee for the Management of City Property of the Saint Petersburg City Administration (Russian: КУГИ Санкт-Петербурга - Комитет по управлению городским имуществом). Today the building houses the Administration Board of the Ministry of Justice and the Chief Technical Commission to the President of the Russian Federation for the Northwestern Federal District.

Restoration of the building began in 2001, and with the support of Rossvyazokhrankultura and Governor Valentina Matvienko, in a project estimated at 170 million rubles, a group of restorers led by OOO «StroyTREST» are planning to recreate the Dioskouroi sculpture for placement on the tympanum of the building. Plans have been in the works for several years to replace the sculpture, and for a time it looked as if the then-warm relations between Russia and Germany would have created the right political atmosphere for the restoration of the building to its former glory.

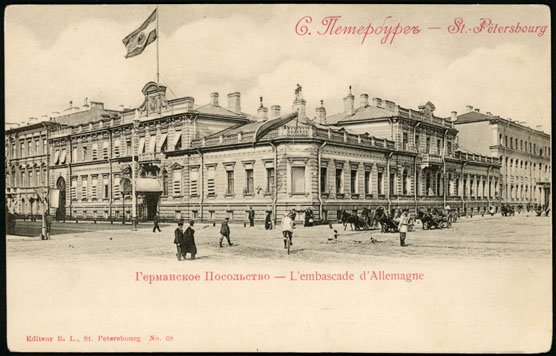
Embassy of the German Empire before rebuilding

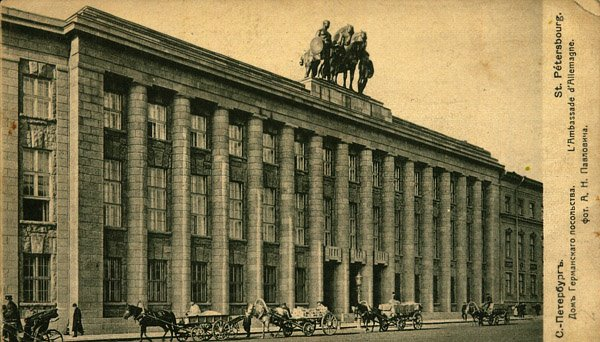
Embassy after completion by Behrens

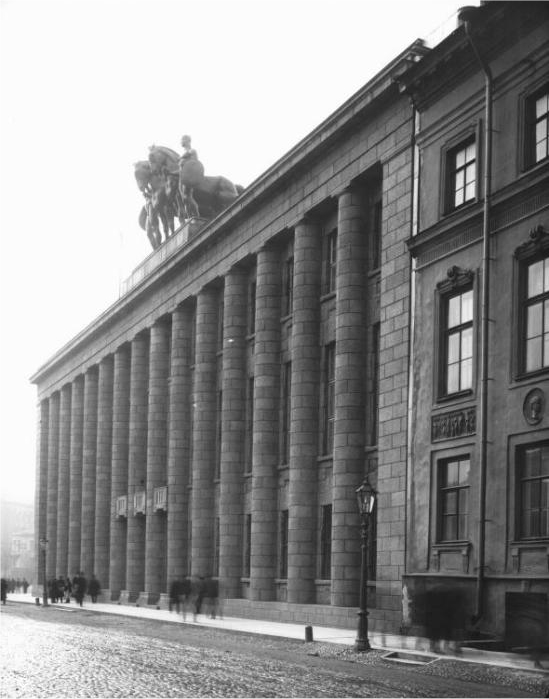
The embassy in 1913

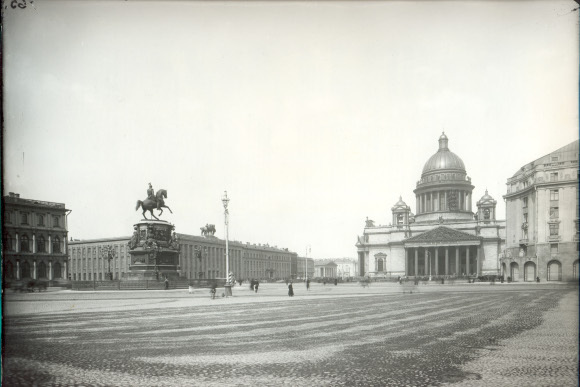
View of Embassy across Saint Isaac's Square

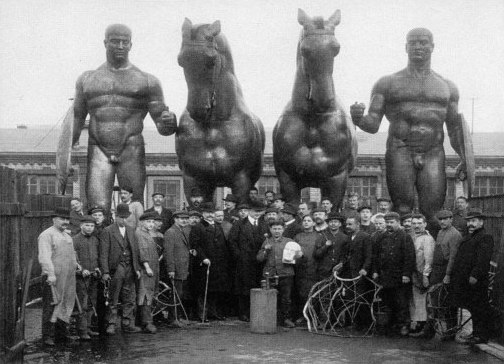
Dioskouroi sculpture before installation on the embassy building

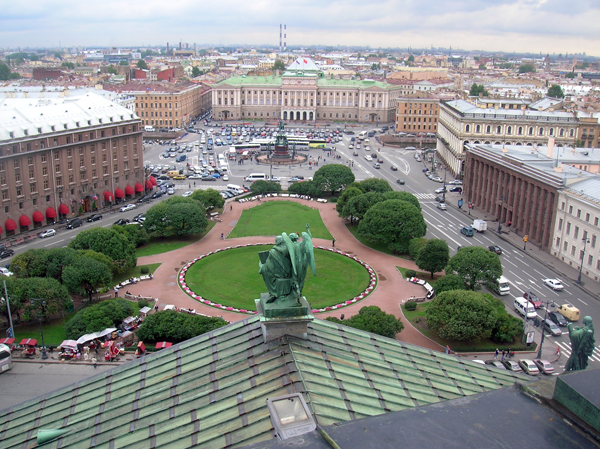
St. Isaac's Square

== See also ==
- Germany–Russia relations
- Embassy of Germany, Moscow
