= Saint Isaac's Square =

Square in Saint Petersburg, Russia

Coordinates: 59°55′55″N 30°18′31″E

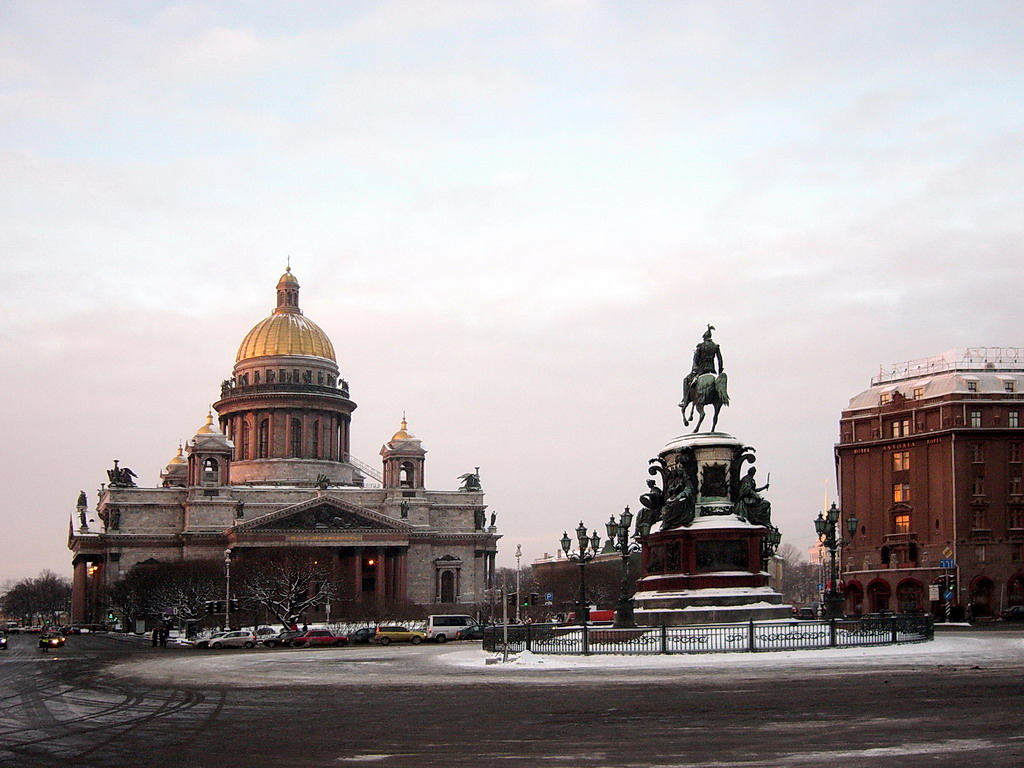
View from Mariinsky Palace on St. Isaac's Cathedral.

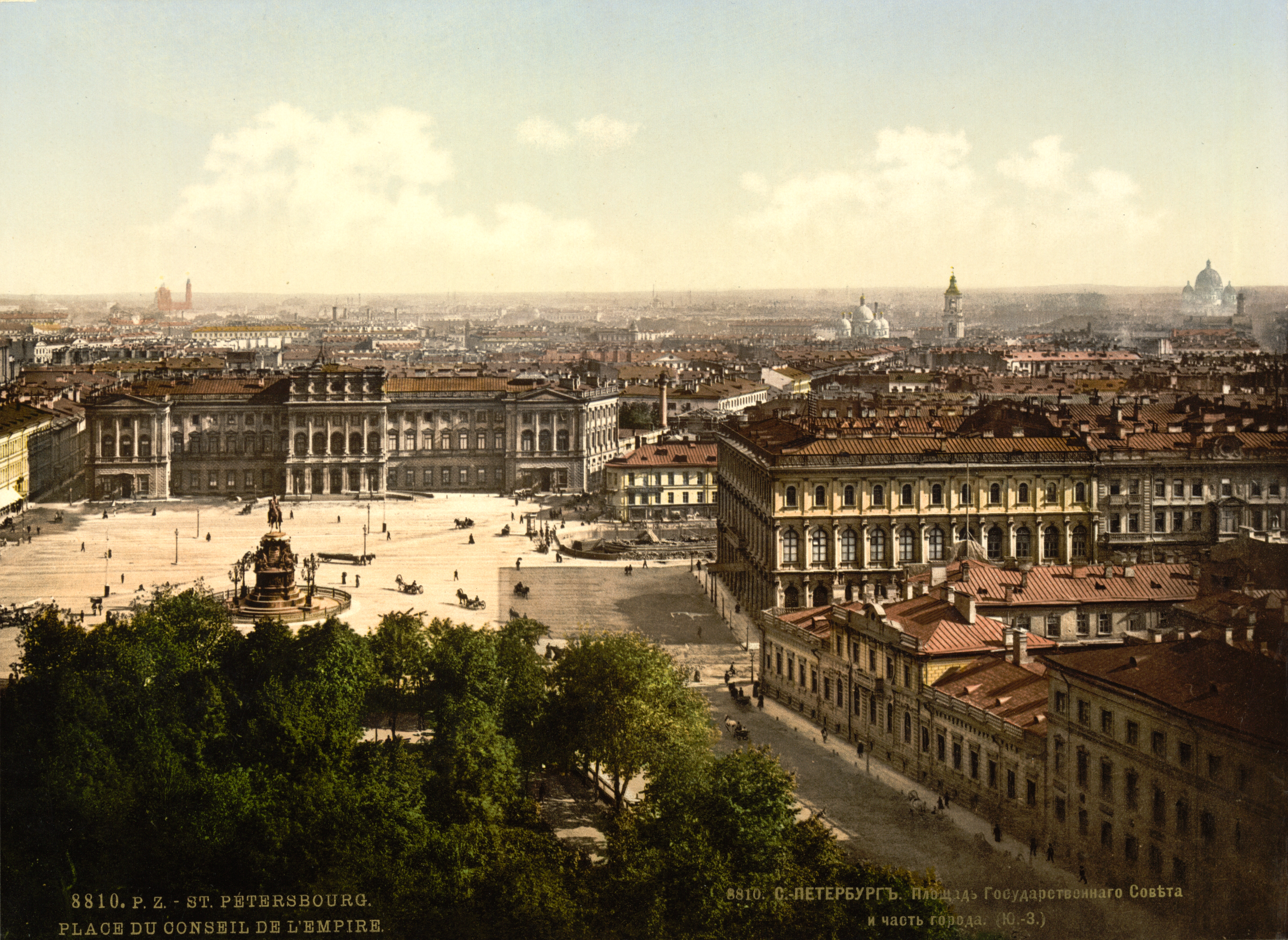
View from St. Isaac's Cathedral on Mariinsky Palace, 19th century

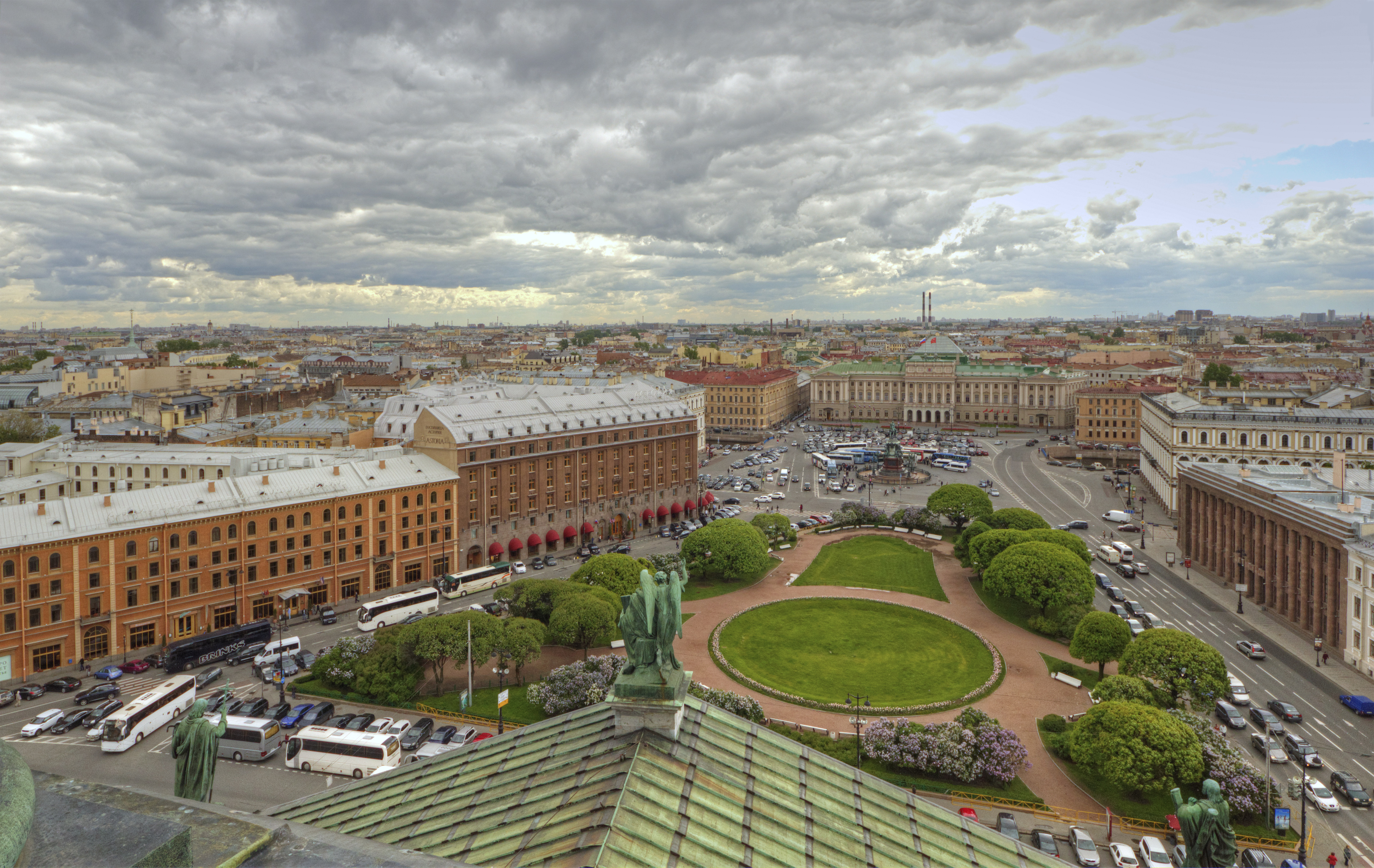
View from St. Isaac's Cathedral on Mariinsky Palace, 21st century

Saint Isaac's Square or Isaakiyevskaya Ploshchad (Russian: Исаа́киевская пло́щадь), known as Vorovsky Square (Russian: Площадь Воровского) between 1923 and 1944, in Saint Petersburg, Russia is a major city square sprawling between the Mariinsky Palace and Saint Isaac's Cathedral, which separates it from Senate Square. The square is graced by the equestrian Monument to Nicholas I.

The Lobanov-Rostovsky House (1817–1820) on the west side of the square was designed by Auguste de Montferrand. It may be described as an Empire style building that has an eight-column portico facing the Admiralty building. The main porch features the twin statues of Medici lions on granite pedestals; they were made famous by Pushkin in his last long poem, The Bronze Horseman. Nearby is Quarenghi's Horse Guards' Riding Hall (1804–1807), in part inspired by the Parthenon and flanked by the marble statues of the Dioscuri, by Paolo Triscornia.

Opposite the cathedral is the Mariinsky Palace, built in 1829–1844 for Grand Duchess Maria Nikolayevna. Currently the palace houses the Saint Petersburg Legislative Assembly. In front of the palace is the 97-metre-wide Blue Bridge, which used to be the widest in Saint Petersburg. Spanning the Moika River, the bridge is usually perceived as the extension of the square, although in fact it forms a separate square, called Mariyinskaya. To the right from the bridge is so-called Neptune's Scale, with a granite top. This is a stele which marks water levels during major floods.

To the east of the cathedral is the six-storey Hotel Astoria, designed by Fyodor Lidval. It opened in 1912 and was one of the most luxurious hotels in the Russian Empire. Adjacent to the Astoria is the hotel Angleterre, which is remembered as the death place of poet Sergei Yesenin. The building found at the corner of Malaya Morskaya Street is associated with Fyodor Dostoyevsky, who lived there in 1848–1849. At this period, he published his first work of fiction, White Nights.

The Russian Institute of Plant Breeding named after Academician Nikolai Vavilov is located in two neo-Renaissance buildings. The institute has a unique collection of 160,000 cultivated plants, which Vavilov collected while travelling in every continent from 1921 to 1940. After the end of the war, a journal published in London reported that Vavilov's collection was lost during the Siege of Leningrad. However, the report was false: although many starved to death, the institute's staff would not consume a single grain of rice or potato tuber from the collection.

One of the last buildings to be erected on the square was the trapezoidal red-granite German Embassy (1911–12), by the architect Peter Behrens. The building is a reference point in the history of Western architecture, as it was the first specimen of Stripped Classicism, a style that enjoyed immense popularity in Stalinist Russia and Nazi Germany.

== See also ==
- List of squares in Saint Petersburg
