= Trust Houses Ltd =

British hospitality company

Trust Houses Ltd was a British hospitality company with temperance origins dating back to 1900. It maintained a distinctive ethos for much of the 20th century. In 1970, at which point it was operating almost 200 hotels, it merged with Forte Holdings Ltd to form Trust House Forte (THF), later the Forte Group.

== Company origins ==
In 1900, Albert Grey, the fourth Earl Grey, proposed a plan to establish a system of what were termed ‘public house trust companies’ for London and the provinces. These companies would acquire licensed premises and manage them as trusts in the interests of the community, rather than private profit. In this Grey was influenced by temperance proposals published in 1894 by Francis Jayne, Bishop of Chester, who had studied the Swedish Gothenburg system. The managers of trust-run licensed premises would be paid a fixed salary with a bonus for good management, but no commission on the sale of alcohol. The public-houses would be refreshment houses, and not merely drinking bars. Overall promotion of the scheme was carried out by an umbrella organisation chaired by Grey, the Central Public House Trust Association, which remained in being up until at least 1937. His initiative coincided with the start of motor tourism, and as well as reducing alcohol consumption, the system promised to give new life to the many country inns and hotels that had languished since the end of the coaching era. Lord Grey looked to the gentry and philanthropists across the country to back the initiative in their local areas.

== Early public house trusts ==
Between 1900 and the outbreak of WWI, public house trust companies were mooted or formed for areas including the following:

- 1901: Derbyshire, Northumberland, London metropolitan area, Ulster, Kent, Sussex, Surrey
- 1902: Durham, Glasgow, Hampshire, North Yorkshire, Renfrewshire, Somerset (later named the Western Counties Public House Trust)
- late 1902/early 1903: Devon, Glamorgan, Lancashire, Liverpool & District
- 1903: Hertfordshire, Gloucestershire
- 1906: Hertfordshire and Essex companies merge, becoming by 1910 the Home Counties Public House Trust

== After WWI ==
By the end of World War I, the company was operating some 100 hotels around England and Wales, well known for their cleanliness, service, and good food. A new unified branding, Trust Houses Ltd, was adopted in December 1918. Expansion northward continued, and in July 1919 Trust Houses Ltd acquired the eight hotels of the East of Scotland Trust Ltd. In 1920 they secured the catering rights at the newly formed Croydon Aerodrome. Although established in Scotland and northern England, in the interwar period Trust Houses Ltd properties were mostly found in the southern half of England. A 1927 guide to some of their more picturesque and historic properties listed nothing further north than Nottingham. They reached a peak of 222 hotels just before World War II.

== WWII and after ==
During World War II nearly all Trust Houses' holdings were requisitioned for military use, and a certain number of these were never returned. After the war, the company expanded into other forms of hospitality, absorbing the Little Chef chain of roadside restaurants. In October 1964, Trust Houses purchased John Gardiner, a large catering firm that owned Kenco. Trust Houses sold Kenco to Cadbury Schweppes in 1969.

At the time of the merger with Forte Holdings Ltd in 1970, the company owned and operated almost 200 hotels throughout the United Kingdom and overseas including the Grosvenor House, Hyde Park, Brown's, and Cavendish hotels. It provided other catering services, including industrial catering and 44 Little Chef restaurants.
