= Novotel Saint Petersburg Centre =

Hotel in Saint Petersburg, Russia

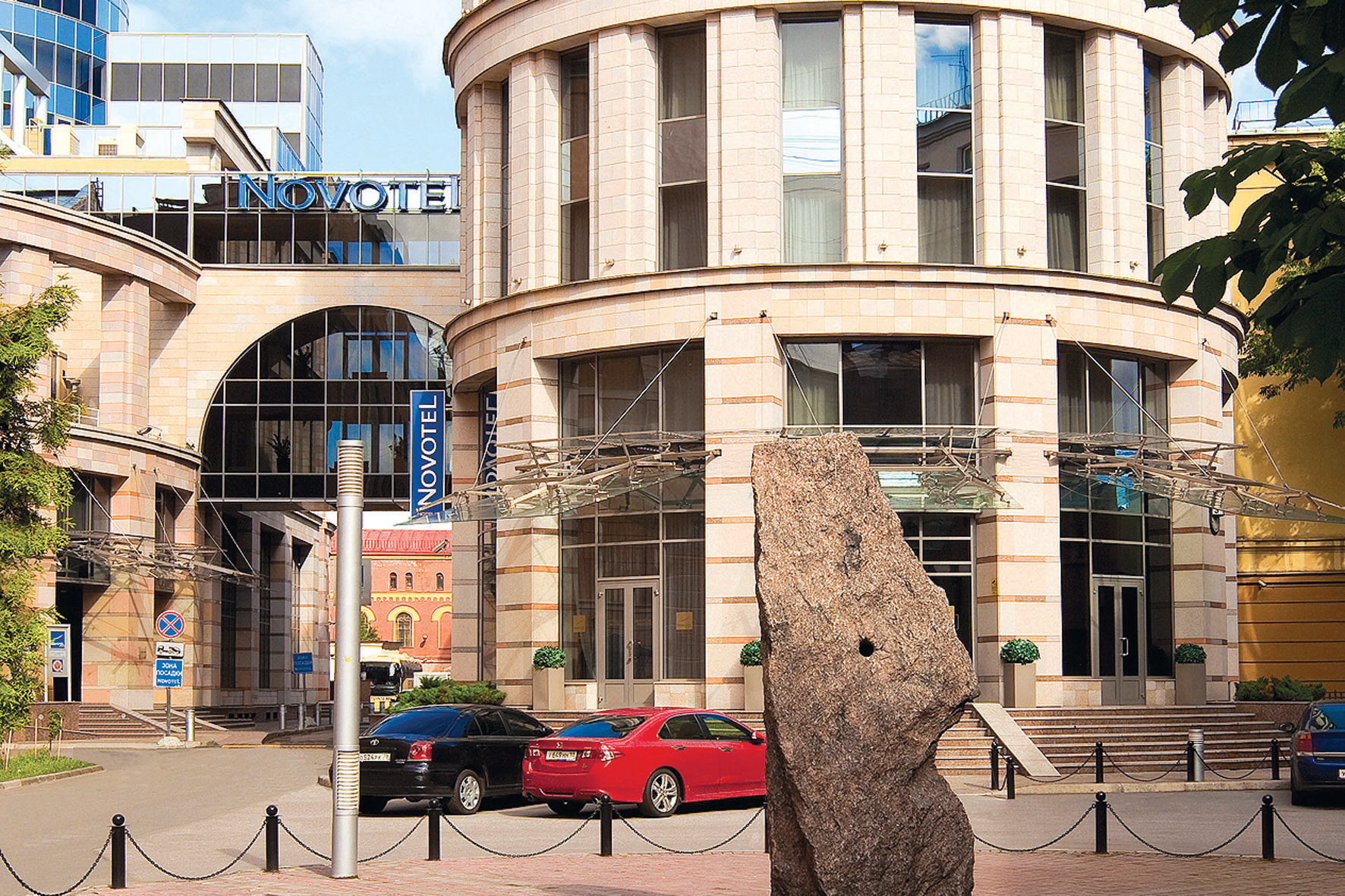
- Interactive map of the Novotel Saint Petersburg Centre area
- Hotel chain: Novotel

General information
- Location: Saint Petersburg, Russia, 3 Mayakovskaya ul., Saint Petersburg, Russia
- Coordinates: 59.93367°N 30.35624°E
- Opening: 2005
- Management: Accor

Technical details
- Floor count: 9

Design and construction
- Architect: Mamoshin M.A.

Other information
- Number of rooms: 233
- Number of suites: 16

Website
- Novotel.com

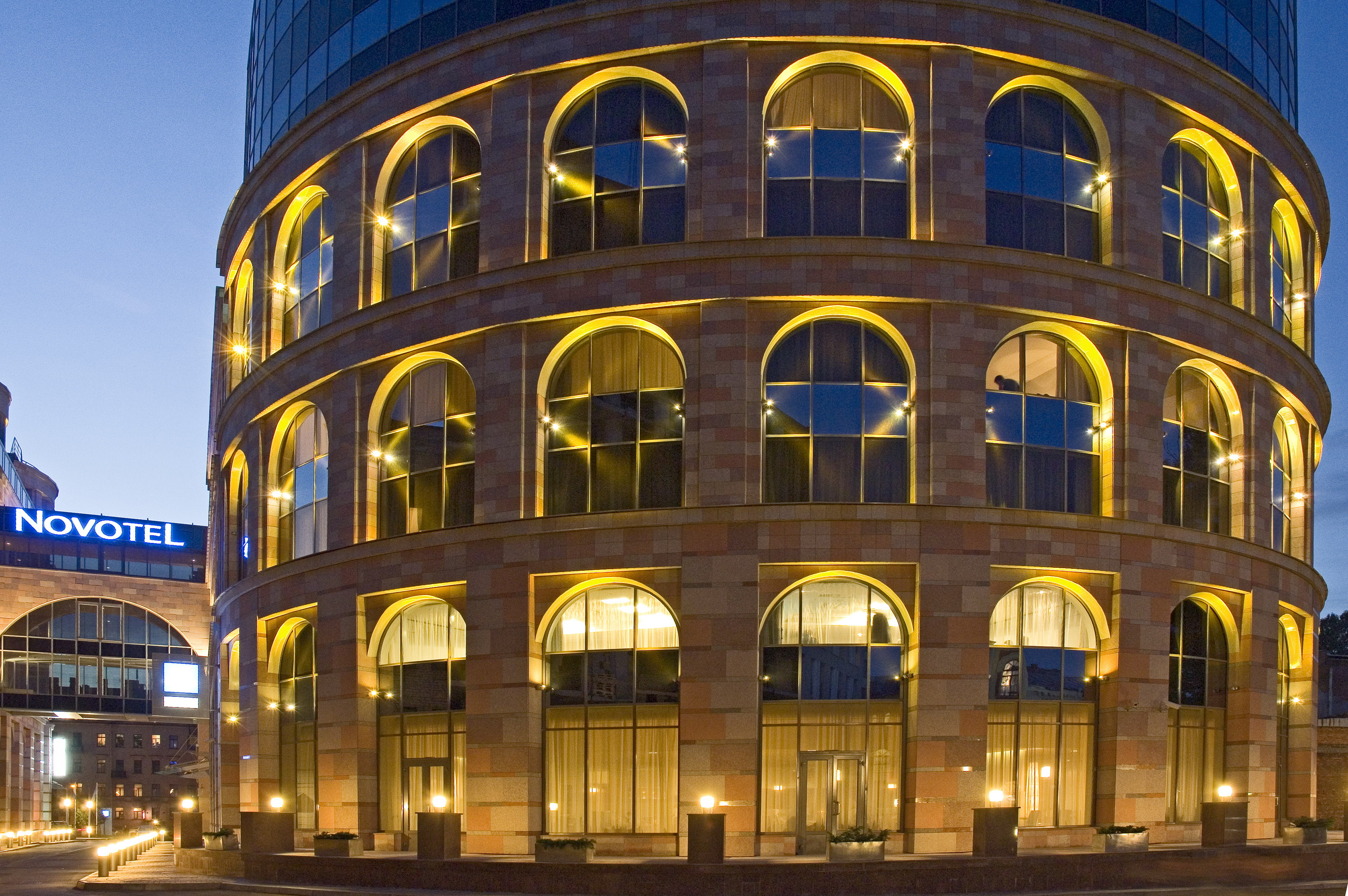
Facade of Novotel Saint-Petersburg Centre hotel is often associated with Coliseum

Novotel Saint Petersburg Centre (Russian: Новотель Санкт-Петербург Центр) is a 4-star hotel that operates under the brand Novotel by Accor Group. It was opened in 2005. The hotel is located at 3 Mayakovskogo ul., Saint Petersburg, Russia. Every room in the hotel has a different shape due to the complicated nature of the building architecture.

== Location ==
The hotel is located in the centre of the city, at 3 Mayakovskogo ul., 100 metres from Nevsky Prospect.

== History ==
The Novotel Saint Petersburg Centre complex was constructed in 2004, part of a municipal renovation project known as 'Quartier (city block) 130'. The project included dividing the city block into four spaces, each one to be occupied by a separate building, every building designed in its own way but all of them united by one architectural doctrine. Two such spaces were sold to Accor Hotels, and a two-building complex was built. The hotel itself opened for business in 2005.

The project was developed as a part of complex development plan. The Quartier 130 ensemble draws largely from classical Italian architecture, Renaissance being one of the main themes. The hotel complex consists of two buildings connected via a 3-storey gallery. The hotel is inspired by traditional Roman architecture.

== Facilities ==
The 9-storey hotel offers 233 rooms (including 16 suites).
