= The Teahouse of the August Moon =

The Teahouse of the August Moon may refer to:

- The Teahouse of the August Moon (novel), a 1951 novel written by Vern Sneider
- The Teahouse of the August Moon (play), a 1953 Broadway play adapted by John Patrick
- The Teahouse of the August Moon (film), a 1956 film adapted by John Patrick, directed by Daniel Mann
- The Teahouse of the August Moon, a 1962 televised version of the play; directed by George Schaefer; a part of the anthology television series Hallmark Hall of Fame (see List of Hallmark Hall of Fame episodes)
