= Angleterre Hotel =

Hotel in St Petersburg, Russia

Coordinates: 59.9334°N 30.3086°E

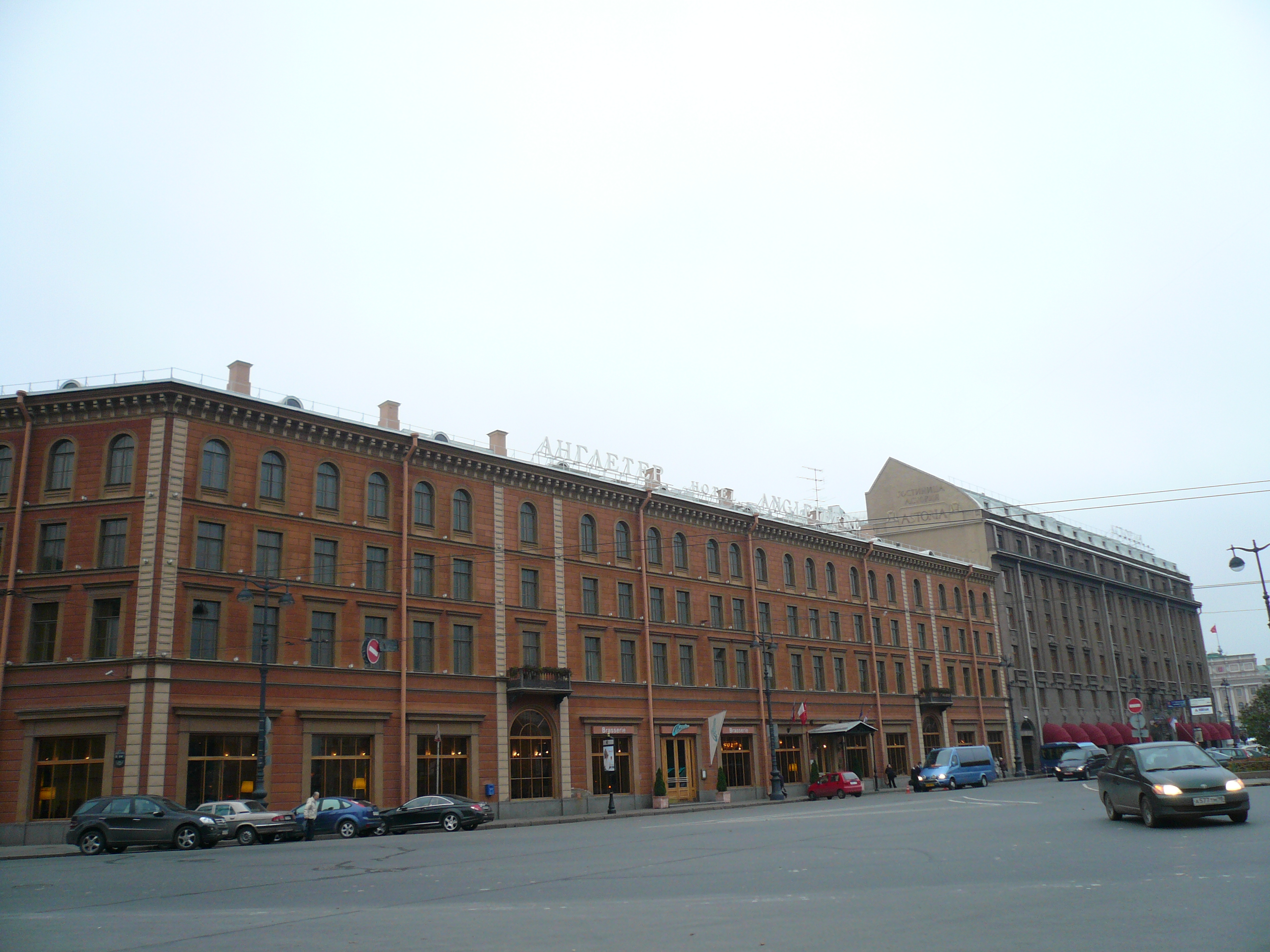

General information
- Location: St. Petersburg, Russia, Ul. Malaya Morskaya 24
- Opening: 1889 (originally); 1991 (current)
- Owner: Rocco Forte Hotels
- Operator: Rocco Forte Hotels

Technical details
- Floor count: 4

Other information
- Number of rooms: 192
- Number of suites: 5
- Number of restaurants: 2

Website
- www.angleterrehotel.com

The Angleterre Hotel (Russian: Англетер) is a modern, luxury business-class hotel on Voznesensky Prospekt at Saint Isaac's Square in Saint Petersburg, Russia. The hotel opened in 1991, replicating a historic hotel originally opened in 1840 and reconstructed in 1876. The hotel has 192 rooms, including five suites. The original hotel building was demolished in 1987, an event which sparked the first major public protest in the history of the Soviet Union to be left unpunished by the authorities.

== History ==
=== 19th century ===
The first hotel on the site was established by Napoleon Bokin in 1840, a three-story structure known as Napoleon's. From 1845–1846, the structure was expanded by architect Adrian Ruben with the addition of a fourth floor and converted to S. Poggenpol's apartment house.

In 1876 it was again rebuilt and converted back to a hotel, named the Hotel Schmidt-Angleterre, with the former for its proprietor, Teresa Schmidt and the latter meaning 'England' in French. Leo Tolstoy was a frequent guest.

=== 20th century ===
The hotel was again reconstructed from 1911–1912, at which point it became the Hotel d'Angleterre. At this point, the hotel had 75 rooms and numerous shops on the ground floor.

The neighboring Hotel Astoria, which opened in 1912, soon proved such a success that the Angleterre was set for demolition for a huge expansion of the Astoria designed by architect Fyodor Lidval, mirroring the existing Astoria building. However the outbreak of World War I prevented this. The hotel's name was changed in 1919, after the Russian Revolution, to Hotel International. It returned to its original name in 1925, the same year poet Sergei Yesenin hanged himself in the hotel on 28 December.

The hotel was converted to Evacuation Hospital No. 926 in September 1941, at the beginning of the Siege of Leningrad. The hospital closed in the summer of 1942 and the building remained vacant until the end of the war. Remodeling began in 1945 and the hotel reopened on December 30, 1948 as the Hotel Leningradskaya. In 1975, the hotel ceased to operate independently and was merged with the adjacent Hotel Astoria as "Block B" of the hotel.

In 1985 the Angleterre hotel structure was closed, and in 1987, during Perestroika, the city authorities decided to demolish the aging hotel and replace it with a modern building with a facade copying the original. Members of the public gathered on St. Isaac's Square to protest the plan. It was the first major public protest in the history of the Soviet Union to be left unpunished by the authorities. The hotel was ultimately demolished on 18 March 1987. The current hotel, designed by A.I. Pribulsky, opened in 1991 as a wing of the adjacent Hotel Astoria.

Rocco Forte Hotels took over the Astoria in 1997, and re-established the Angleterre as a separate hotel in 1999. The Angleterre is marketed as the business-class wing of its more luxurious sister. The upper guest room floors of the two hotels are connected.

=== 21st century ===
A cinema opened in the hotel in 2013, but closed in 2025.

== Gallery ==
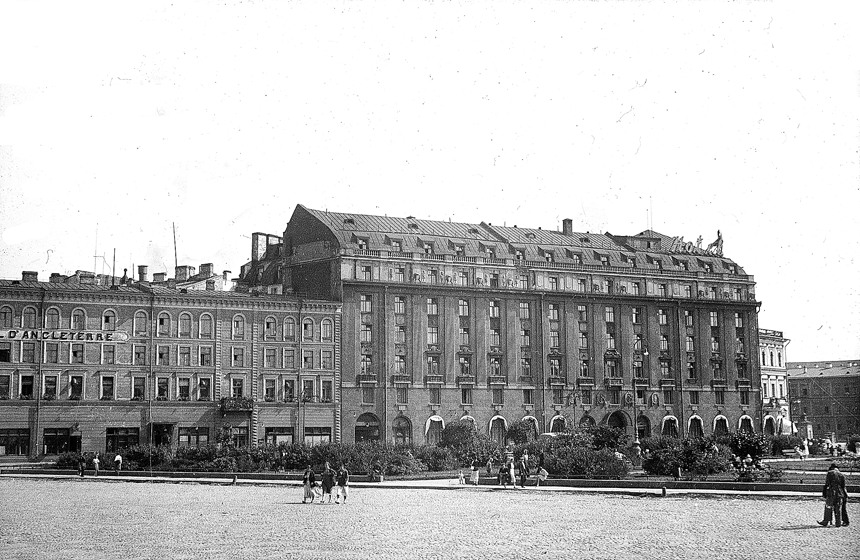
The Angleterre and Astoria in 1930

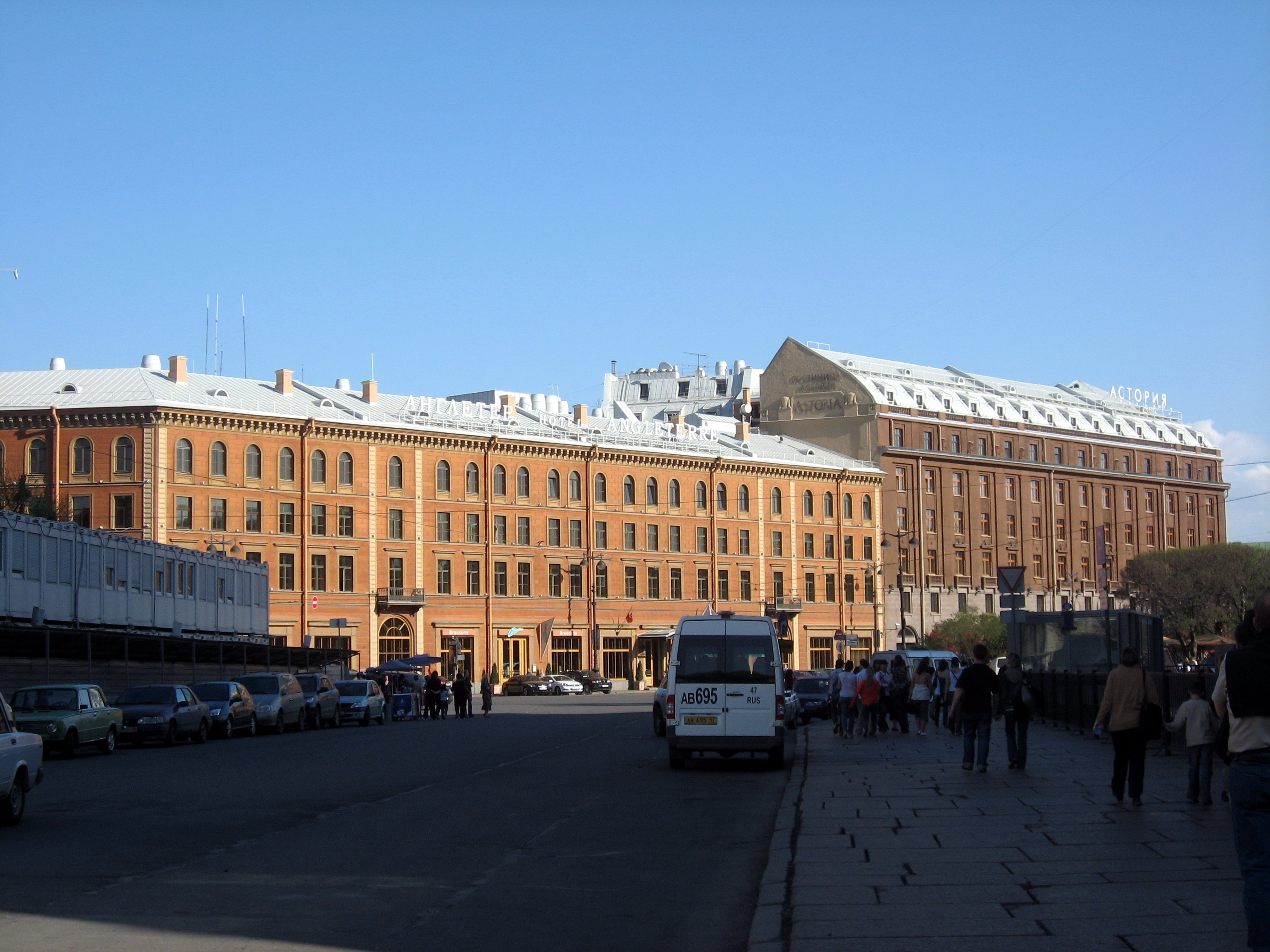
The Angleterre and Astoria in 2008

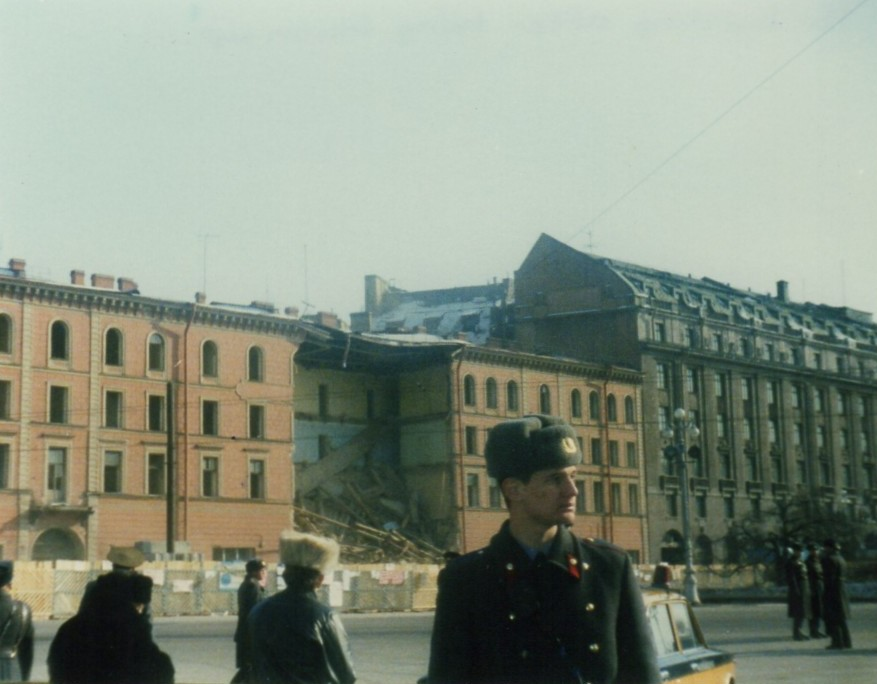
Just after demolition explosion on March 18 1987

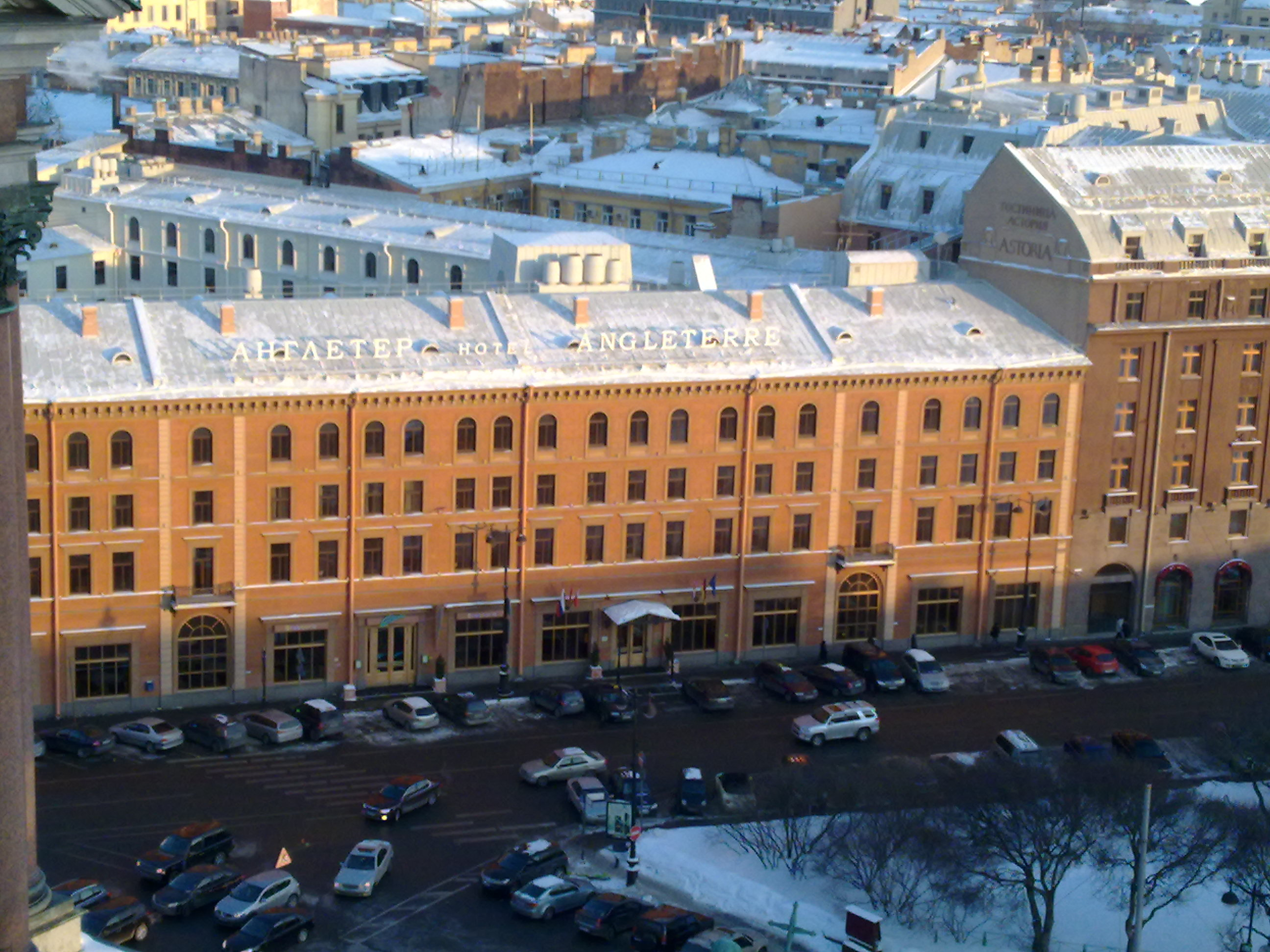
The Angleterre seen from St. Isaac's Cathedral
