= Hotel Astoria (Saint Petersburg) =

Luxury hotel in Saint Petersburg, Russia

Coordinates: 59.933°N 30.309°E

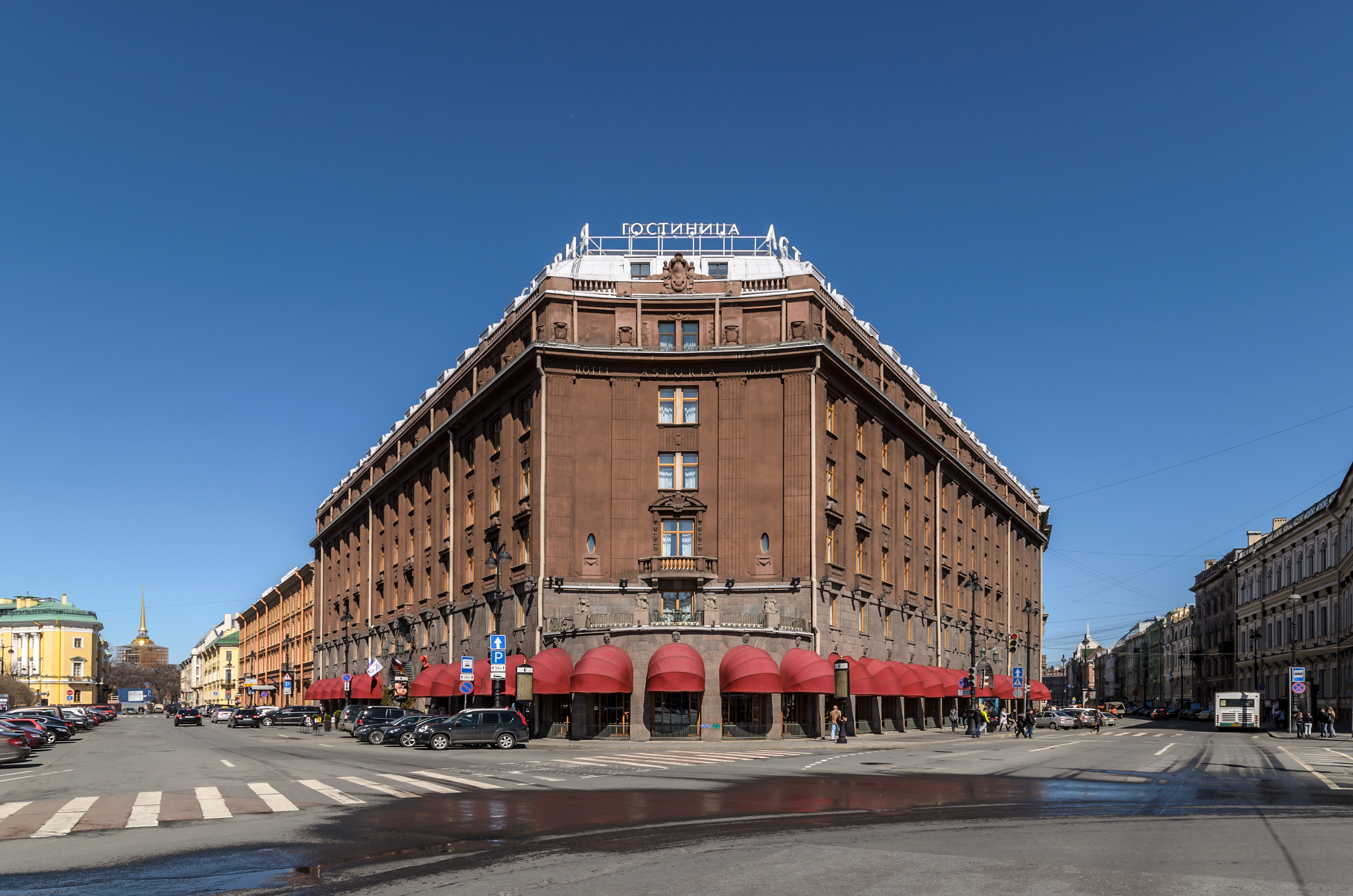
- Interactive map of the Hotel Astoria area

General information
- Location: Saint Petersburg, Russia
- Opened: December 23, 1912
- Owner: Rocco Forte Hotels
- Operator: Rocco Forte Hotels

Design and construction
- Architect: Fyodor Lidval
- Developer: Wayss & Freytag

Other information
- Number of rooms: 169
- Number of suites: 86
- Number of restaurants: 2

Website
- Official website

The Hotel Astoria (Russian: гости́ница «Асто́рия») is a historic five-star luxury hotel in Saint Petersburg, Russia, opened in 1912. It has 213 bedrooms, including 52 suites, and is located on Saint Isaac's Square, next to Saint Isaac's Cathedral and across from the historic Imperial German Embassy. The Hotel Astoria, along with its adjoining sister hotel, Angleterre Hotel, is owned and managed by Rocco Forte Hotels. The hotel underwent a complete refurbishment in 2012.

== History ==
=== Site ===
The site of the hotel was formerly occupied by a three-story building, dating to the late 18th Century, which became the property of the Lvov princely family in the 1870s. Prince Alexander Lvov, an early proponent for the advancement of modern fire fighting in Russia, made the building the headquarters of the United Russian Fire-fighting Society, as well as the newspaper Pozharnoye delo (Fire-fighting), of which he was the editor. The ground floor contained various shops. After the turn of the 20th century, the building began offering rooms to rent. In 1902, the structure was purchased by the Rossiya Insurance Company, which demolished it in 1907 to allow for construction of a modern hotel. In 1910, the land was sold to the UK-based Palace Hotel Company, but they sold it a year later to the German construction company Wayss & Freytag, which built the hotel from 1911–1912 and owned and operated the business.

=== Early years ===
The Hotel Astoria opened on December 23, 1912. It was designed by Russian-Swedish architect Fyodor Lidval, who developed a style based on Art Nouveau and also influenced by Neoclassical architecture. The Astoria was built to host tourists visiting Russia for the Romanov tercentenary, a huge celebration of 300 years of Russian imperial rule in May 1913. The luxurious hotel was used during the celebrations to house guests of the imperial family, and was afterwards popular with the aristocracy. Rasputin was said to stay there with some of his married lovers. The Astoria soon proved such a success that the neighboring Angleterre Hotel was set for demolition, for a huge expansion of the Astoria designed by Lidval, mirroring the existing building. However, the outbreak of World War I prevented this.

On August 1, 1914, in the opening days of the war, the Imperial German Embassy across the square was stormed by an anti-German mob. Some of the embassy employees are reported to have fled to the Hotel Astoria via a secret underground connecting tunnel, constructed by the hotel's German owners. Wayss & Freytag placed the property nominally under the ownership of its French manager, Louis Terrier, but it was soon established that the hotel was, in fact, owned by a company in an enemy combatant country. The hotel was sequestered from its foreign ownership in 1915 and fully nationalized by the Russian government in 1916. It was converted to the Petrograd Military Hotel, Petrograd being the new name given to the city itself, so it would sound less German. The hotel was searched on September 10, 1917 during the Kornilov affair, an attempted military coup, and about forty people in the hotel were arrested.

=== Soviet period ===
During the October Revolution, on November 8, 1917, a detachment of Red Guards stormed the hotel and captured a number of military officers and cadets. The hotel was taken over by the Bolsheviks, who fired the manager and replaced him with a revolutionary commissar. In January 1918, the hotel accommodated delegates to the All Russian Constituent Assembly, before it was disbanded by the Bolsheviks. The hotel was then used to house the staff of the All-Russian Central Executive Committee of the Soviets of Workers' and Soldiers' Deputies. American journalist John Reed stayed in the hotel during this period, as he reported on the Revolution and wrote his book Ten Days That Shook the World. When the national capital was moved to Moscow, the hotel became the hostel of the Petrograd Soviet of Workers' and Soldiers' Deputies, housing the new rulers of the city, including Grigory Zinoviev, who ran the city government. The hotel hosted delegates to the 1st Congress of the Comintern in 1919 (including Vladimir Lenin, who spoke from its balcony), and the 2nd World Congress of the Communist International in 1920.

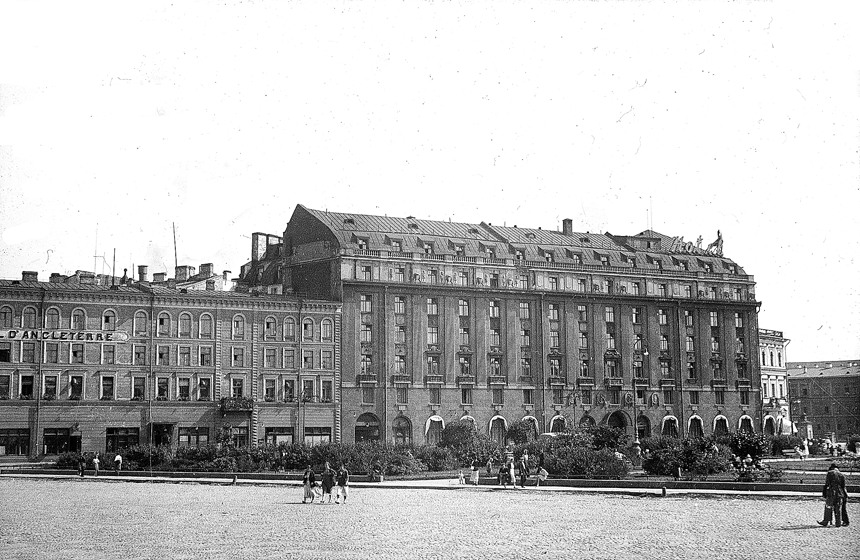
The Angleterre and the Astoria in 1930

The Astoria was handed over to Intourist, the state-run tourism monopoly, in 1926, and converted back to a luxury hotel hosting mainly foreign visitors. During World War II, the hotel served as a field hospital during the Siege of Leningrad. There is a legend that Adolf Hitler reportedly planned to hold a victory banquet in the hotel's Winter Garden. He was so convinced Leningrad (now Saint Petersburg) would fall quickly that invitations to the event were printed in advance.

The Astoria was managed by Intourist until it closed in 1987, for renovations, designed by architect A.I. Pribulsky.

=== Modern era ===
The Astoria reopened in 1991, after renovations by a Finnish construction company. At that point, the hotel consisted of two connected buildings. Block A was the original 1912 Hotel Astoria building. Block B was an adjoining brand new reproduction of the demolished Hotel Angleterre.

In December 1992, Mayor Anatoly Sobchak sought a foreign partner to further renovate the hotel, to international five-star standards, but the hotel's workers' collective filed papers to privatize the hotel, competing against nine international hotel operators favored by Sobchak. After lengthy legal battles, Rocco Forte Hotels acquired the hotel in December 1997 and spent $20 million on further renovations. In 1999, Rocco Forte Hotels rebranded Block B, returning it to its historic name, Hotel Angleterre. The upper guest room floors of the two hotels remain connected.

The hotel was renovated again in 2012, for its centennial.

== Famous guests ==
The hotel's many famous guests have included Lenin, Isadora Duncan, H. G. Wells, Alexander Vertinsky, Prince Charles, Luciano Pavarotti, Madonna, Elton John, Truman Capote, John Denver, Jack Nicholson, Vladimir Putin, Alain Delon, Gina Lollobrigida, Marcello Mastroianni, Dmitri Hvorostovsky, Atal Bihari Vajpayee, Pierre Cardin, Jean Paul Gaultier, Margaret Thatcher, Jacques Chirac, Tony Blair and U.S. President George W. Bush. Writer Mikhail Bulgakov spent his honeymoon at the hotel in 1932 and is said to have written parts of The Master and Margarita in room 412.

== Awards ==
2014

- Conde Nast Traveller Awards: inclusion in Top 100 Hotels and Resorts in the World by Conde Nast Traveller Awards
