= Brown's Hotel, London =

Hotel in London, England

Brown's Hotel

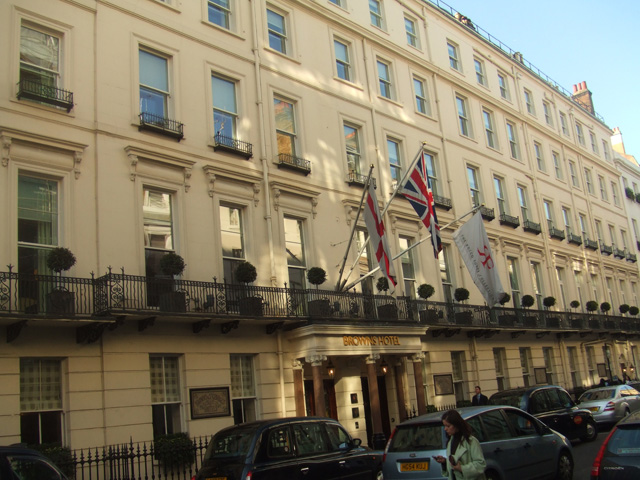

- Location within Central London

General information
- Location: 33 Albemarle Street, Mayfair, London
- Coordinates: 51°30′33″N 0°8′33″W
- Opened: 1832
- Owner: Rocco Forte Hotels
- Operator: Rocco Forte Hotels

Technical details
- Floor count: 6

Other information
- Number of rooms: 112
- Number of suites: 29
- Number of restaurants: 3
- Parking: Valet parking

Website
- Brown's Hotel

Brown's Hotel is a 5-star hotel in Mayfair, London, established in 1832 and owned by Rocco Forte Hotels since July 2003. It is London's oldest luxury hotel, never having been renamed, rebuilt or relocated. Famous visitors include US President Franklin Roosevelt, Mahatma Gandhi and Diana, Princess of Wales.

== History ==
Brown's Hotel was founded in 1832 by James and Sarah Brown, former domestic servants, at 23 Dover Street. It grew piecemeal over the next 80 years and today consists of 13 connected Georgian townhouses. This expansion included the 1889 incorporation of St George's Hotel on Albemarle Street, where the hotel's main entrance is now located.

After spending more than a century in family ownership, the hotel was sold in 1948 to Trust Houses, later becoming part of the Forte hotel empire.

Throughout its history the hotel has been a favourite place of rest for writers, including Joseph Conrad, Baroness Orczy, Tom Wolfe, William Golding, Dennis Wheatley, Evelyn Waugh, Arthur C Clarke, A A Milne, Jorge Louis, Mark Twain and Agatha Christie, who is said to have used the hotel as the inspiration for At Bertram's Hotel.

Rudyard Kipling first stayed at the hotel on his wedding night, 18 January 1892. After the marriage service at All Souls Church, Langham Place, the 26-year-old Kipling had a late lunch with his best man and cousin Ambrose Poynter. His wife, Caroline Kipling, joined him later and the newly-weds remained in residence until 26 January. The bill for the Kiplings’ stay came to £22 but this was paid for by the proprietor as, Caroline noted in her diary, ‘a slight repayment for the pleasure Rud has given him.’ During the rest of his life, Brown's became Kipling's hotel of choice in the capital. He described it in a 1907 letter as ‘our faithful, beloved, warm, affectionate Brown’s Hotel.’ The first-floor suite of rooms overlooking Albemarle Street, which the Kiplings had occupied at the start of their marriage, was always kept reserved for them when they were in town. It now forms part of the Kipling Suite.

In the early 1980s, hotel guest Stephen King, suffering from jetlag and with the outline of a new plot scribbled out on an American Airlines cocktail napkin, went downstairs to find a quiet place to write. The concierge guided him to a desk on a second-floor landing. According to legend, Kipling had used its cherry-wood expanse during his frequent visits. King later said: ‘Stoked on cup after cup of tea, I filled sixteen pages of a steno notebook.’ The result was the outline of Misery, King's 1987 novel about a deranged fan.

The hotel has also attracted many royals and rulers, both while in office and in exile: King Alfonso XII; Ismail Pasha, the ex-Khedive of Egypt; Sir James Brooke, Rajah of Sarawak; Queen Wilhelmina of the Netherlands; Elizabeth, Queen of the Belgians; Haile Selassie I of Ethiopia; George II, King of the Hellenes; and King Zog of Albania.

Future American president Theodore Roosevelt was married to Edith Carow on 2 December 1886 at St George's, Hanover Square while staying at Brown's Hotel. Roosevelt had to stay at the hotel for 15 days to meet the residency requirement to obtain a marriage license. He wrote from Brown's to his close friend Henry Cabot Lodge on 22 November 1886: ‘I have had very good fun here. I brought no letters and wrote no one I was coming, holding myself stiffly aloof; and, perhaps in consequence, I have been treated like a prince.'

During World War II, Dutch Prime Minister Pieter Gerbrandy took up residence at Brown's for the duration of the conflict. He used it as his base of operations, including hosting lunch parties. Future prime minister Anthony Eden and his wife were guests in September 1942. Gerbrandy's sitting room was often used for cabinet meetings and during the meeting on 8 December 1941, in the aftermath of the attack on Pearl Harbor, the Dutch government formally declared war on Japan.

The hotel came under the management of Rocco Forte Hotels on 3 July 2003, having once been operated by Raffles International Hotels. During 2004–2005, the hotel underwent a £24 million refurbishment and re-opened in December 2005.

== Interior ==
Brown's Hotel is noted for its traditional English Victorian sophistication fused with a contemporary feel. The bedrooms were redesigned by Olga Polizzi and combine modern features with traditional furnishing, and are all individually decorated. The Kipling Suite is the hotel's largest, known as the setting for Rudyard Kipling's stays and some of his subsequent writings.

The hotel has several restaurants and bars. Charlie's (formerly HIX Mayfair and Beck at Brown's) is an à la carte restaurant which serves seasonal British cuisine with contemporary European influence. The Drawing Room, at the front of the hotel, has served afternoon tea and light snacks since the mid-nineteenth century; it features fine wood-panelling and Paul Smith décor. The Donovan Bar is named after the British photographer Terence Donovan and is lined with over 50 black and white prints of his photographs. The hotel also has a gymnasium and spa treatment rooms.
