= Oktyabrskaya Hotel =

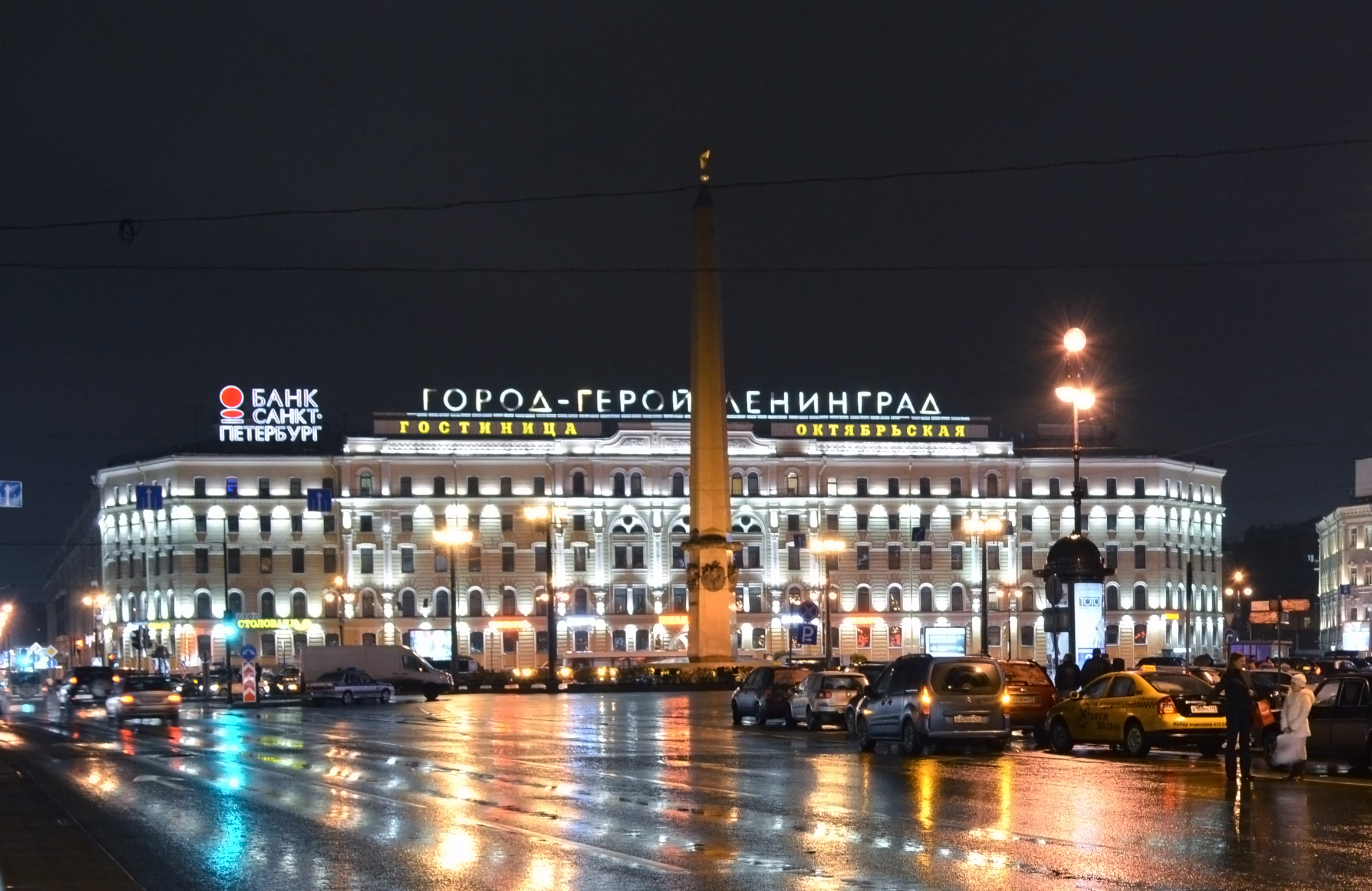
- Interactive map of the Oktyabrskaya Hotel area

General information
- Location: Vosstaniya Square, Central Saint Petersburg
- Opened: 1851

Other information
- Public transit access: Moscow Railway Station

Oktyabrskaya Hotel (Znamenskaya Hotel until 1887; Great Northern until 1930), a four-star hotel founded in 1851, is located in Central Saint Petersburg, in Vosstaniya Square.

== Location ==
The Oktiabrskaya Hotel is located in the centre of Saint Petersburg opposite Moscow Railway Station. The hotel consists of two buildings: "Oktiabrskiy" (Ligovskiy av., 10) and "Ligovskiy" (Ligovskiy av., 41/83). Shopping centers are located here, sights of St.-Petersburg, such as the Hermitage, Kazan Cathedral, Church of the Savior on Spilled Blood in a walk from the hotel.

== Accommodations ==
The Oktiabrskaya Hotel feature 2 restaurants named Assambleya and Abazhur. The hotel offers 373 rooms. All rooms are designed according to the architectural "golden ratio" principle and feature ergonomic furniture and modern equipment. The most recent room renovation was completed in 2019. In 2020, the reception and lounge areas were reconstructed. The Oktyabrskaya Hotel is a large multifunctional complex, including not only rooms but also a conference area and a restaurant.

== History ==
1845 – the author of the project of the main building of the hotel was an architect A.P. Gemilian. Constructible surface for the future hotel was presented to a merchant Ponomariov, but by the end of 1846 it turned out that the construction work was too slow, so the land was given to a collegiate adviser Count Y.I. Stanbock-Fermore and his wife. The count also bought another building not far from the hotel at the Ligovskiy avenue. Severe restrictions on the activities of the tavern establishments and the hotel in particular made it difficult to run the hotel, so during several years it had changed several owners. For a few decades the building was renovated several times and the internal layout had been changed a lot.

1887 - the hotel was renamed to the "Great North".

At the end of 19th century the current owner of the hotel V.I. Soloviov had bought a steam & horse omnibus, steered by a coachman that used to run between the hotel and all the railway stations of the city. During the period between 1896 and 1912 additional floors were built.

In 1904, Alexei Pokotilov, a terrorist who was involved in the assassination of Internal Affairs Minister Vyacheslav von Plehve was killed in an explosion at the hotel.

The revolutionary events of 1917 affected the "Great Northern" hotel. By September 1, 1918, all the movable property of the hotel had been inventoried and the building and all of the furniture went to the Office of Nikolai (October) Railway. In 20th years the City Residence of the Proletariat was founded in the hotel, where the waifs from the city were brought.

1929 – During the years of NEP, the life in Saint-Petersburg had improved so there was a strong need in hotels that could accommodate increased number of tourists. At the end of 1929 the former hotel rooms had been vacated, and renovation of the hotel was started. In 1930, the hotel under the new name "Oktiabrskaya" was ready to receive guests.

During World War II a permanent establishment for tram and trolleybus transport workers was organized there, the premises could accommodate up to 400 people. After breaking through the blockade the hotel began to work as usual.

The new reconstruction was carried out on the eve of "Olympic 80". The building was reconstructed to recreate the façade of the project of 1871, as during that time the outward of the building harmonized the architecture of the railway station in the best way. Unfortunately, after the Olympics the hotel had not received measurable financial investments.

In 1994 the hotel got a new impulse when the state-owned enterprise was transformed into a public company, 60% of the shares were owned by the city, 40% - were distributed among the workforce.

In 1996 a decision to completely renovate the hotel was made. 24 million dollars of internal funds was allocated. The hotel acquired two boiler rooms and a laundry, an air-conditioning system was installed, a water purification system was set up, service lines were changed and also an electronic key system was introduced. On July 8, 2008, after the full-scale reconstruction was complete of the hotel was officially assigned to the category of 4*. In March 2011 Hotels "Oktiabrskaya", "Saint-Petersburg" and "Ol'gino" merged into a holding company under the brand "Citytel". The Management Company was established in order to improve management efficiency and service quality, further development of the network is being planned.

For April 2023, the hotel had 450 rooms.
