= Wosskow =

Wosskow is a surname. Notable people with the surname include:

- Debbie Wosskow (born 1974), British entrepreneur
- Lawrence Wosskow (born 1963), British entrepreneur

== See also ==
- Waskow
