= Types of restaurant =

Restaurants fall into several industry classifications, based upon menu style, preparation methods and pricing, as well as the means by which the food is served to the customer. This article mainly describes the situation in the US, while categorisation differs widely around the world.

== Origin of categories ==
Historically, restaurant referred only to places that provided tables where one ate while seated, typically served by a waiter. Following the rise of fast food and take-out restaurants, a retronym for the older "standard" restaurant was created, sit-down restaurant. Most commonly, "sit-down restaurant" refers to a casual-dining restaurant with table service, rather than a fast food restaurant or a diner, where one orders food at a counter. Sit-down restaurants are often further categorized, in North America, as "family-style" or "formal".

In British English, the term restaurant almost always means an eating establishment with table service, so the "sit down" qualification is not usually necessary. Fast food and takeaway (take-out) outlets with counter service are not normally referred to as restaurants. Outside North America, the terms fast casual dining restaurants, family style, and casual dining are not used and distinctions among different kinds of restaurants are often not the same. In France, for example, some restaurants are called "bistros" to indicate a level of casualness or trendiness, though some "bistros" are quite formal in the kind of food they serve and clientele they attract. Others are called "brasseries", a term which indicates hours of service. "Brasseries" may serve food round the clock, whereas "restaurants" usually only serve at set intervals during the day. In Sweden, restaurants of many kinds are called "restauranger", but restaurants attached to bars or cafes are sometimes called "kök", literally "kitchens", and sometimes a bar-restaurant combination is called a "krog", in English a "tavern".

In Dishing It Out: In Search of the Restaurant Experience, Robert Appelbaum argues that all restaurants can be categorized according to a set of social parameters defined as polar opposites: high or low, cheap or dear, familiar or exotic, formal or informal, and so forth. Any restaurant will be relatively high or low in style and price, familiar or exotic in the cuisine it offers to different kinds of customers, and so on. Context is as important as the style and form: a taqueria is a more than familiar sight in Guadalajara, Mexico, but it would be exotic in Albania.

== Categories of restaurant ==
=== Fast food ===
Fast food restaurants emphasize speed of service. Operations range from small-scale street vendors with food carts to multibillion-dollar corporations like McDonald's and Burger King. Food is ordered not from the table, but from a front counter (or in some cases, using an electronic terminal). Diners typically then carry their own food from the counter to a table of their choosing, and afterward dispose of any waste from their trays. Drive-through and take-out service may also be available. Fast food restaurants are known in the restaurant industry as QSRs or quick-service restaurants.

=== Fast casual ===
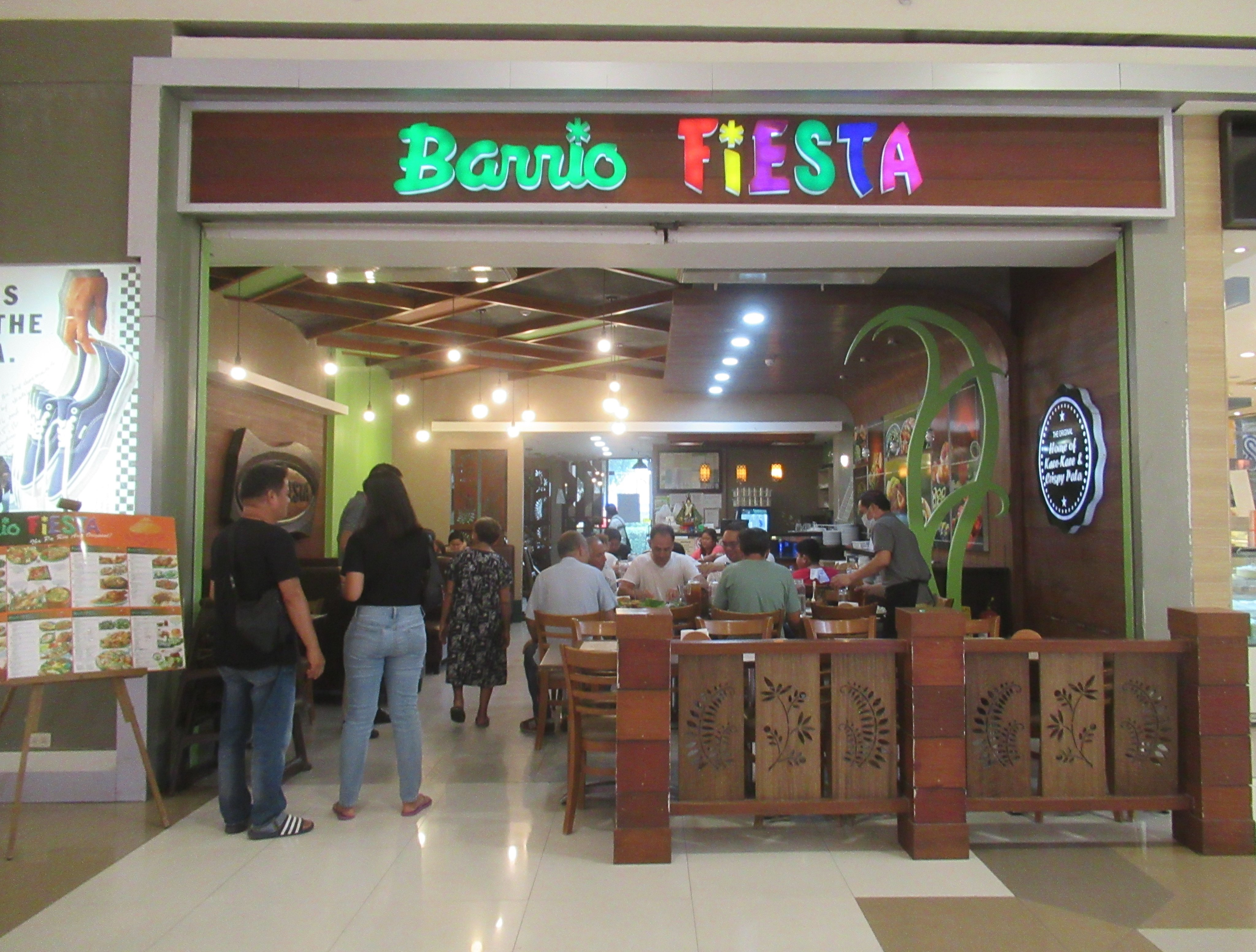
Barrio Fiesta (casual dining restaurant chains in the Philippines)

Fast casual restaurants are primarily chain restaurants, such as Chipotle Mexican Grill and Panera Bread. More of the food is prepared at the restaurant than is the case at fast food chains. Fast casual restaurants usually do not offer full table service, but many offer non-disposable plates and cutlery. The quality of food and prices tend to be higher than those of a conventional fast food restaurant but may be lower than casual dining.

=== Casual dining/slow casual ===
Main List: Casual dining restaurants

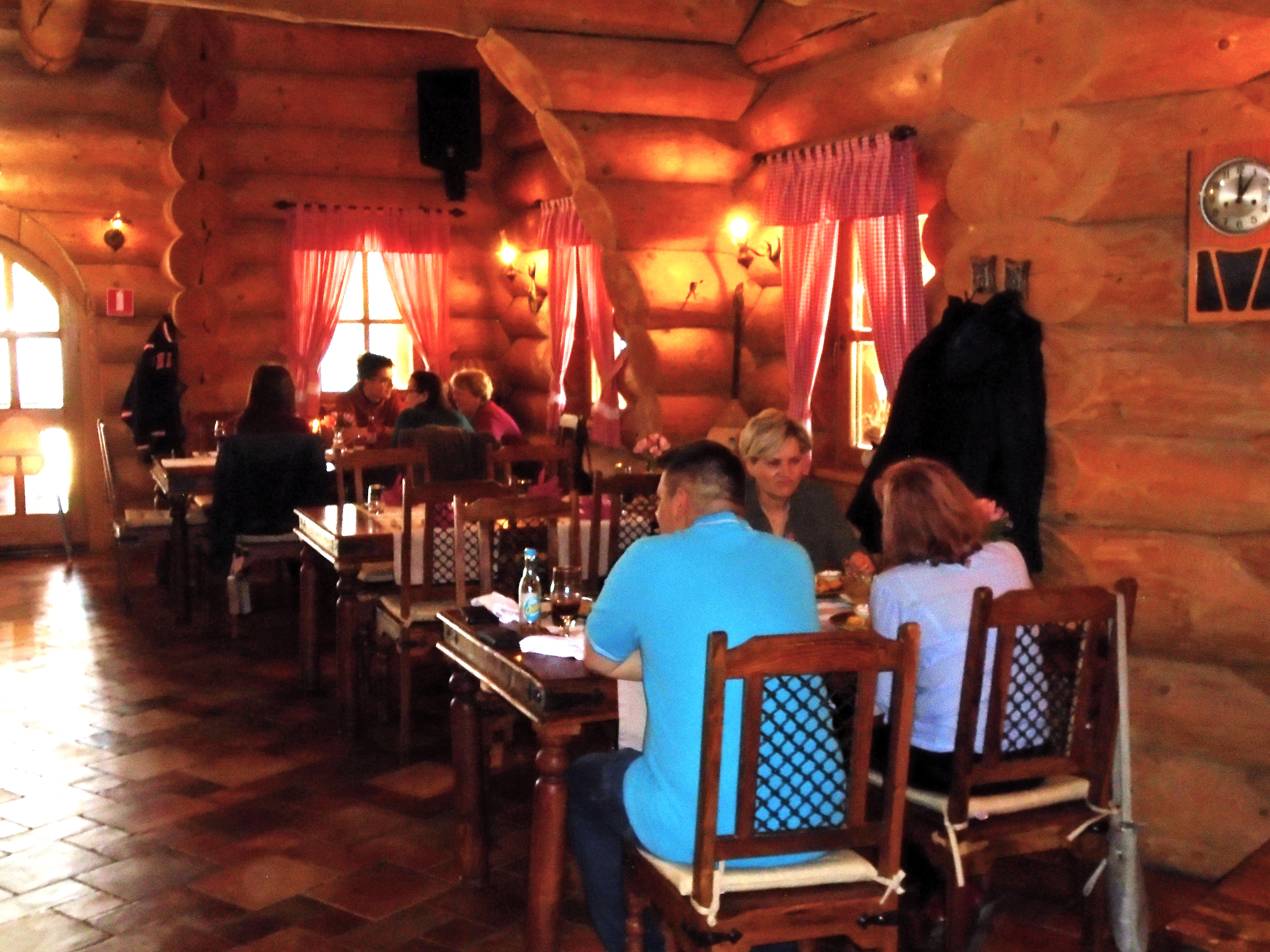
Kneja Restaurant, a sit-down restaurant in Međimurje County, Croatia

A casual dining restaurant (or sit-down restaurant) is a restaurant that serves moderately priced food in a casual atmosphere. Except for buffet-style restaurants, casual dining restaurants typically provide table service. Chain examples include Harvester in the United Kingdom and Applebee's in the United States. Casual dining comprises a market segment between fast food establishments and fine dining restaurants. Casual dining restaurants often have a full bar with separate bar staff, a full beer menu and a limited wine menu. They are frequently, but not necessarily, part of a wider chain, particularly in the United States. In Italy, such casual restaurants are often called trattorie, and are usually independently owned and operated.

Casual dining restaurants' popularity has declined in the 2010s and 2020s in the United States.

==== Family-style ====
Family-style restaurants are a type of casual dining restaurants where food is often served on platters and the diners serve themselves. It can also be used to describe family-friendly diners or casual restaurants.

=== Fine dining ===
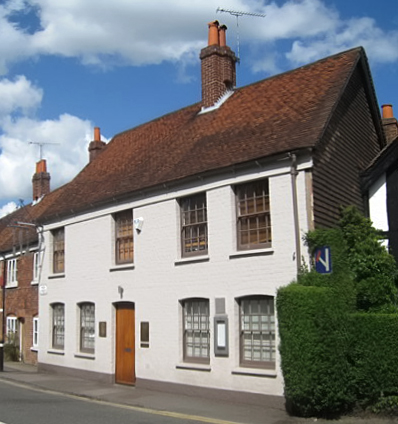
The Fat Duck, a fine dining destination restaurant in Bray, UK

Fine dining restaurants are full-service restaurants (FSRs) with specific dedicated meal courses. Décor of such restaurants features higher-quality materials, with establishments having certain rules of dining which visitors are generally expected to follow, sometimes including a dress code.

Fine dining establishments are sometimes called white-tablecloth restaurants, because they traditionally featured table service by servers, at tables covered by white tablecloths. The tablecloths came to symbolize the experience. The use of white tablecloths eventually became less fashionable, but the service and upscale ambiance remained.

== Variations ==
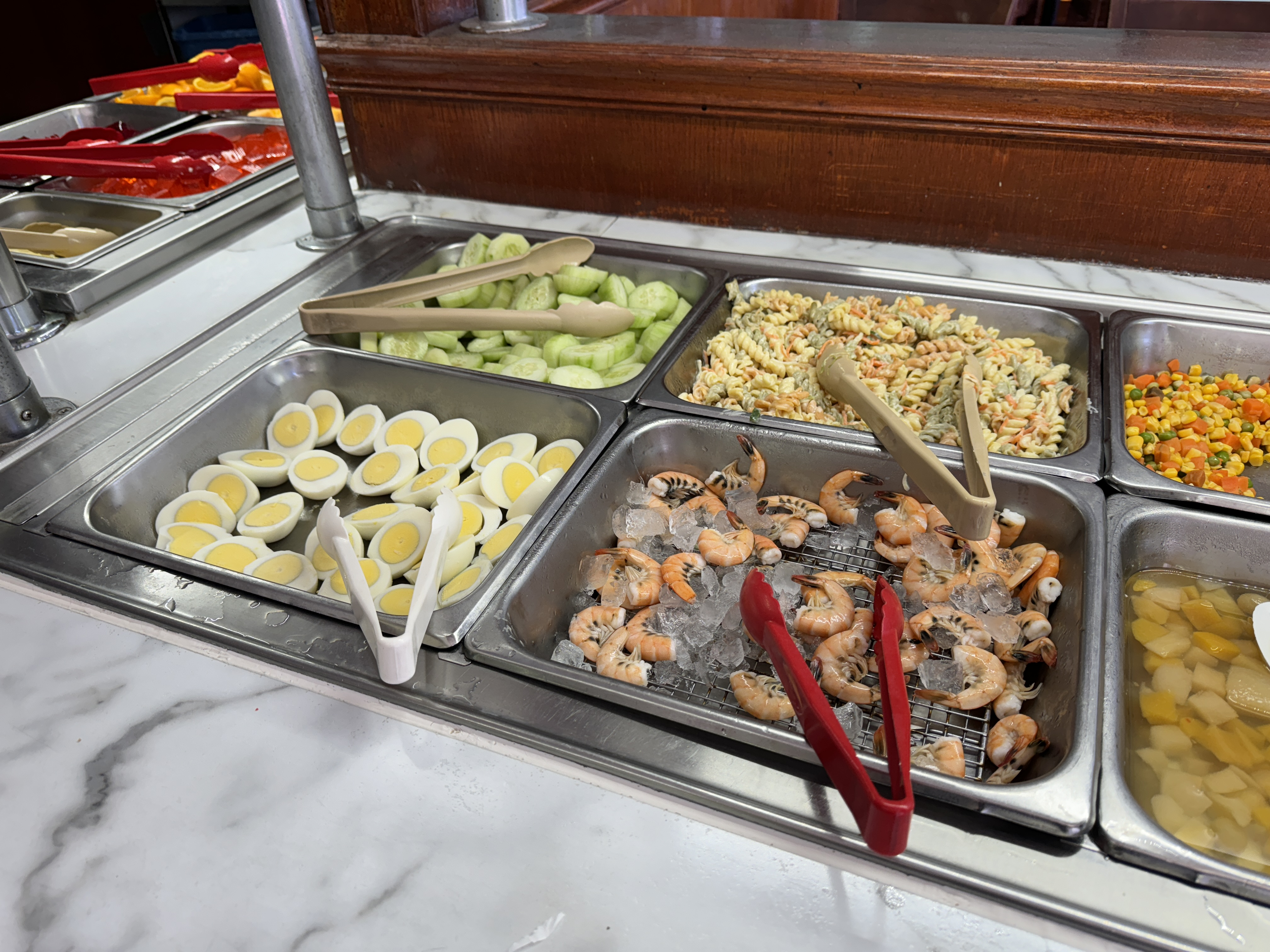
Super China Buffet, Indianapolis, Indiana

Most of these establishments can be considered subtypes of fast casual drinking restaurants or casual dining restaurants.

=== Ethnic ===
Ethnic restaurants specialize in ethnic or national cuisines. For example, Greek restaurants specialize in Greek cuisine.

=== Brasserie and bistro ===
A brasserie in the United States has evolved from the original French idea of a type of restaurant serving moderately priced hearty meals—French-inspired "comfort foods"—in an unpretentious setting. In the United States, bistros usually have more refined decor, fewer tables, finer foods and higher prices. When used in English, the term bistro usually indicates a continental menu.

=== Buffet and smörgåsbord ===
Buffets and smörgåsbord offer patrons a selection of food at a fixed price. Food is served on trays around bars, from which customers with plates serve themselves. The selection can be modest or very extensive, with the more elaborate menus divided into categories such as salad, soup, appetizers, hot entrées, cold entrées, and dessert and fruit. Often the range of cuisine can be eclectic, while other restaurants focus on a specific type, such as home-cooking, Chinese, Indian, or Swedish. The role of the waitstaff in this case is relegated to removal of finished plates, and sometimes the ordering and refill of drinks. In Italy, a kind of semi-buffet is featured in either a tavola calda, serving hot foods, and a tavola fredda, which serves cold food. Either can be found in bars and cafes at meal times or in dedicated sites, sometimes with seating and service at a counter.

=== Cafés and diners ===
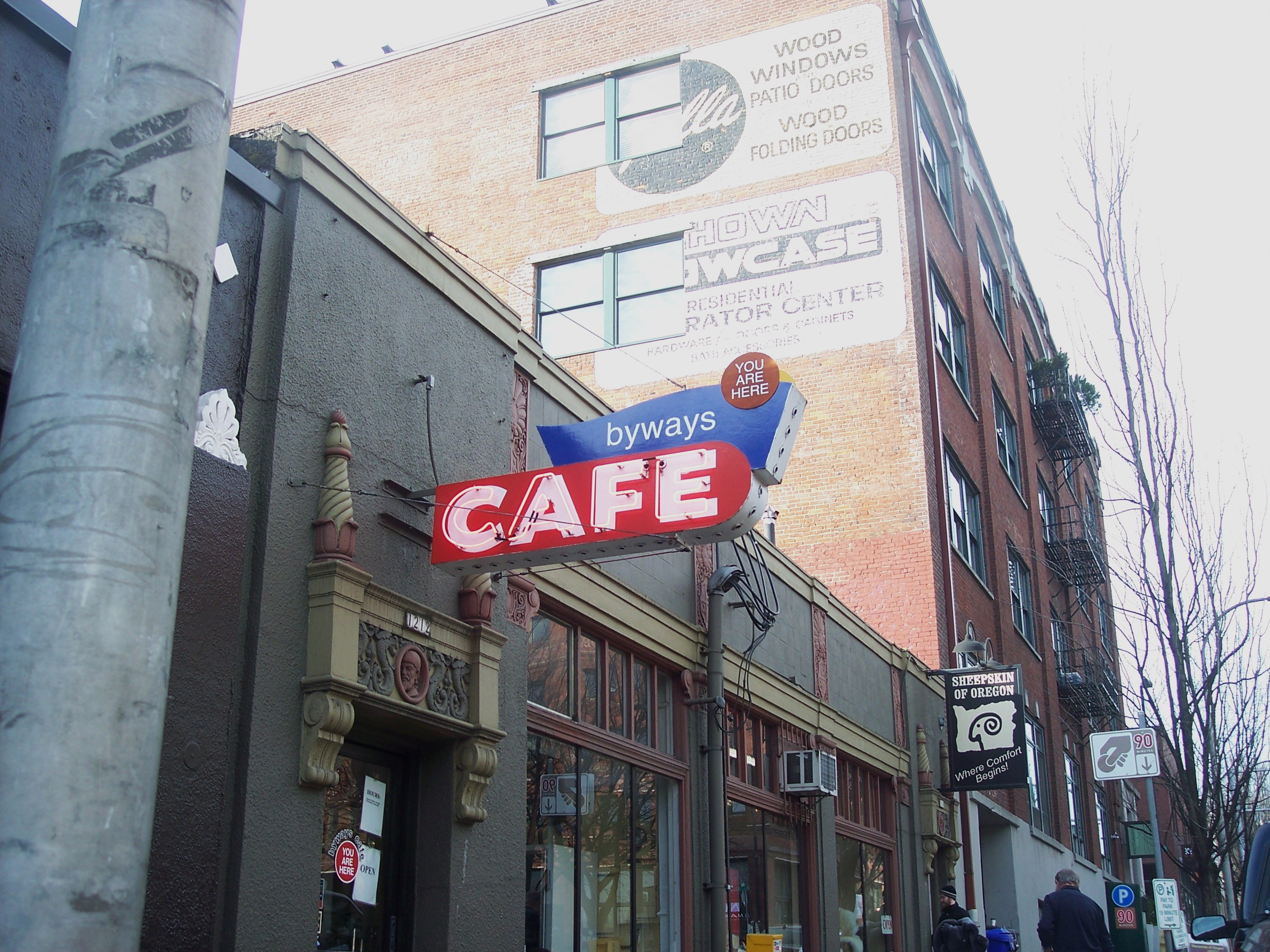
Byways Cafe in Portland, Oregon, US

British cafes and American diners are informal eateries offering a range of hot meals and made-to-order sandwiches or rolls. Coffeehouses or cafés are not full restaurants, because they primarily serve and derive the majority of their revenue from hot drinks. Many cafes are open at breakfast time and will serve full hot breakfasts all day. In some areas, cafes offer outdoor seating. The word comes from the French café.

=== Cafeteria ===
A cafeteria is a restaurant serving ready-cooked food arranged behind a food-serving counter. There is no table service. Typically, a patron takes a tray and pushes it along a track in front of the counter. Depending on the establishment, servings may be ordered from attendants, selected as ready-made portions already on plates, or self-serve their own portions. Cafeterias are common in hospitals, prisons, corporations and educational institutions like schools and colleges. In Italy, they are very common and are known as "mensa aziendale".

In the UK, a cafeteria (also known as a self-service restaurant) may also offer a large selection of hot food. Cafeterias have a wider variety of prepared foods: for example, it may have a variety of roasts (e.g. beef, ham, turkey) ready for carving by a server, as well as other main courses, rather than simple offerings of hamburgers or fried chicken.

=== Coffee house ===
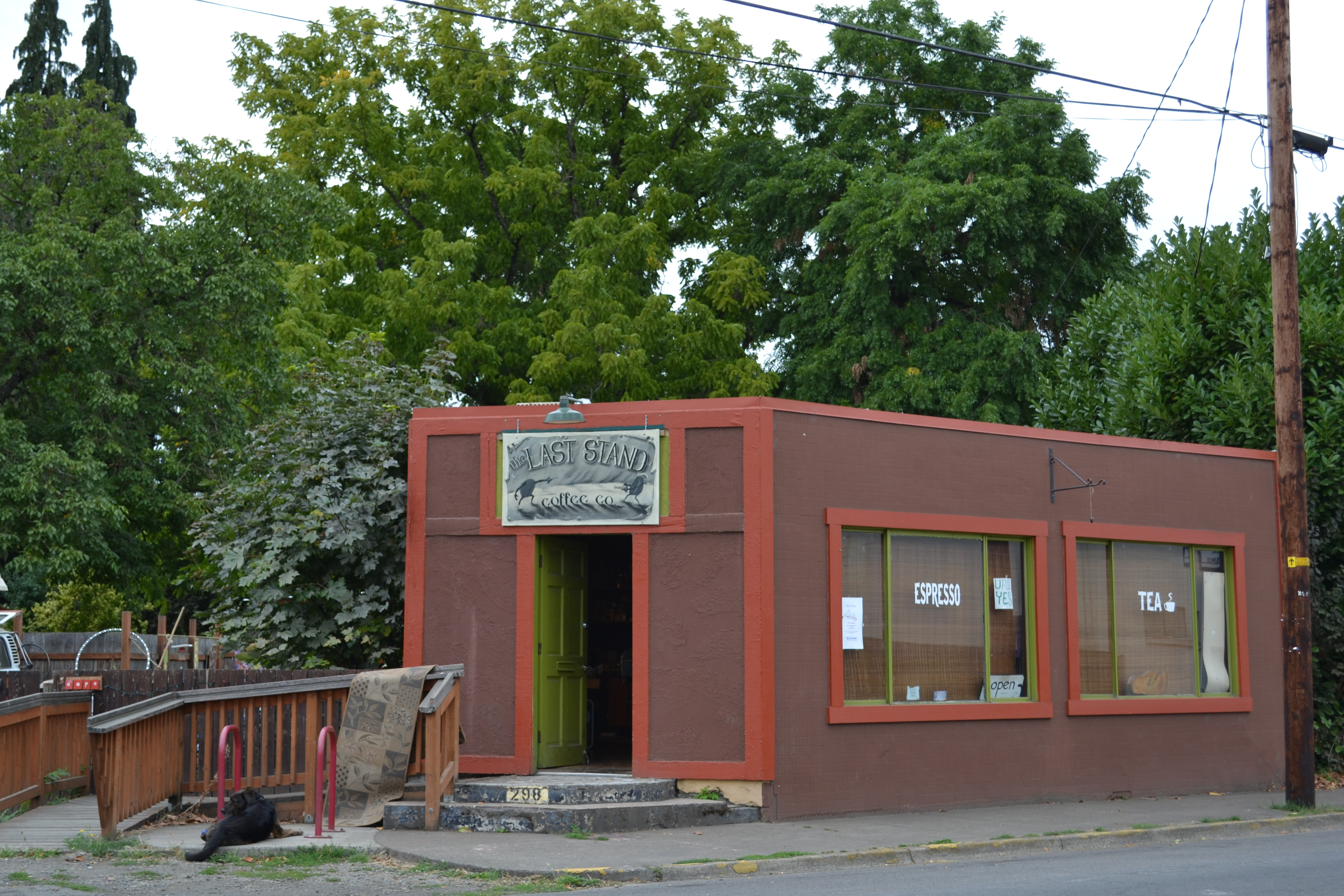
The Last Stand Coffeehouse, seating optional

Coffeehouses are casual restaurants without table service that emphasize coffee and other beverages; typically a limited selection of cold foods such as pastries and perhaps sandwiches are offered as well. Their distinguishing feature is that they allow patrons to relax and socialize on their premises for long periods of time without pressure to leave promptly after eating, and are thus frequently chosen as sites for meetings.

=== Destination restaurant ===
A destination restaurant is one that has a strong enough appeal to draw customers from beyond its community. The idea of a destination restaurant originated in France with the Michelin Guide, which rated restaurants as to whether they were worth a special trip or a detour while one travelled by car in France.

=== Greasy spoon ===
A greasy spoon is a colloquial term for a British cafe, American diner or other small eatery which tends to serve food at a low cost. Generally fried foods are served, and in the United Kingdom, such places frequently serve all-day breakfasts and strong builder's tea. They are commonly found in working-class areas.

=== Tabletop cooking ===
Customers are seated as in a casual dining setting. Food items are prepared by the establishments for cooking on embedded gas stoves, induction cookers, or charcoal grills; the customer has control over the heating power of the appliance.

=== Mongolian barbecue ===
Despite the name, the Mongolian barbecue form of restaurant is not Mongolian, rather is derived from Taiwan and inspired by Japanese teppanyaki. Customers create a bowl from an assortment of ingredients displayed in a buffet fashion. The bowl is then handed to the cook, who stir-fries the food on a large griddle and returns it on a plate or in a bowl to the consumer.

=== Pub ===
Traditionally, pubs were primarily drinking establishments with food in a secondary position, whereas many modern pubs rely on food as well, to the point where gastropubs are often known for their high-quality fine dining style pub food and concomitantly high prices. A typical pub has a large selection of beers and ales on tap.

=== Teppanyaki-style ===
Many restaurants specializing in Japanese cuisine offer the teppanyaki grill, which is more accurately based on a type of charcoal stove that is called shichirin in Japan. Diners, often in multiple, unrelated parties, sit around the grill while a chef prepares their food orders in front of them. Often the chef is trained in entertaining the guests with special techniques, including cracking a spinning egg in the air, forming a volcano out of differently-sized onion slices, and flipping grilled shrimp pieces into patrons' mouths, in addition to various props. Also referred to as hibachi.

=== Digital-only ===
A digital or online restaurant is a type of restaurant in which there are no seats or tables, and payments are made only by non-cash. The purpose of such restaurants is for customers to come to the place just to pick up the order.

== See also ==
- Automat
- Brasserie
- Concession stand
- Diner
- Dining car
- Food trucks
- Hot dog stand
- Pizzerias
- Sandwich bar
