= Manor Walks Shopping & Leisure =

- South Mall of the centre pictured in 2025
- Location: Cramlington, England
- Coordinates: 55.08545°N 1.5893°W
- Address: Cramlington, NE23 6UT
- Opened: 1987
- Owner: LXB Holdings (1987–2006) Hammerson plc (2006–2016) Advance Northumberland (2016–present)
- Num. of stores: 103
- Floor area: 442,802 sq ft
- Parking: 1,500 parking spaces
- Website: manorwalks.co.uk

Manor Walks Shopping & Leisure, often referred to as simply 'Manor Walks', is a large shopping centre located in Cramlington, England. The centre was originally opened in 1987 by Bobby Charlton, however parts of the centre date back to the 1970s.

Anchor tenants include a 9-screen Vue multiplex cinema, supermarkets Asda and Sainsbury's and the Concordia Leisure Centre. Other retailers include Boots, Greggs, Next, TK Maxx and JD Sports. It is widely recognised as the largest shopping centre in Northumberland.

== Shops ==
The centre comprises 103 stores, with 16 of these being in the adjacent Westmorland Retail Park. There are 12 food outlets on site, including Nando's, Burger King, Coltello Lounge, Subway and Muffin Break - with the majority of these being concentrated in the South Mall of the centre.

There are four supermarkets on site, Sainsbury's, Asda, M&S Foodhall and The Food Warehouse.

Plans were revealed in June 2026 by owner Advance Northumberland to redevelop the centre's western entrance and create four new units. However, some tenants have been forced to move their due to the demolition of a portion of the centre, proving controversial between business owners.

== Car parking ==
There are 3 car parks situated at each entrance to the centre, all with a combined total of 1,500 spaces.

The centre operates a scheme known as 'Park Plus', which allows customers to park for 2 extra hours at no extra cost, valid for 24 hours on request.

== Ownership ==
When the centre first opened as Manor Walks in 1987, it was managed by investment firm LXB Holdings. In 2006, LXB Holdings was acquired by development company Hammerson plc, meaning Manor Walks was included in this acquisition.

Hammersmith later sold the centre to Northumberland County Council's commercial division, Arch (now Advance Northumberland), in 2016 for a total of £78 million.

In June 2026, Advance Northumberland announced plans to sell the Manor Walks shopping centre and increase the value of the centre to £100 million before the end of the decade. As part of these plans, a redevelopment to the centre's West Mall was proposed - which involves the creation of a new multi-purpose 'town square', entrance gateway and 4 new retail units. Advance Northumberland anticipates the redevelopment will be complete by early 2028, if the project goes to plan.

== Transport links ==
=== Bus ===
The centre has bus stops at both the west and east of the centre, with bus services being provided by Arriva.

=== Train ===
The Cramlington train station is in close proximity to the centre, allowing for links to Newcastle city centre and Morpeth using Northern services.

=== Pedestrian/cycling ===
There are multiple footpaths and cycle tracks linking each area of Cramlington to the centre. This means the centre is accessible by foot or bicycle without the need to cross a road due to Cramlington's intricate network including underpasses and signposted routes.
