= Little Chef =

Former British roadside restaurant chain

- Industry: Roadside restaurant chain
- Founded: 17 June 1960; 66 years ago
- Founder: Sam Alper
- Defunct: 31 January 2018; 8 years ago
- Owner: Kout Food Group K.S.C.C. (trademarks)

Little Chef was a British chain of roadside restaurants; opened in June 1960 by Sam Alper who was inspired by American diners. The chain was famous for the "Olympic Breakfast" – its version of a full English breakfast – as well as its "Early Starter" and "Jubilee Pancakes". The restaurants were mostly located on A roads, often paired with budget hotels and petrol stations.

The chain expanded rapidly throughout the 1970s, with its parent company acquiring its only major competitor, Happy Eater, in August 1986. After all Happy Eater locations were converted to the Little Chef fascia in the late 1990s, the chain peaked with 439 restaurants. Little Chef began to face decline in the early 2000s, mainly due to over-expansion, meaning it could not properly invest in all of its locations, as well as competition from fast-food and pub chains. By the end of 2005, almost half of its locations had been closed.

In January 2007, the chain was rescued from administration and subsequently reduced to 196 restaurants. This was followed by another closure programme in January 2012 to reduce the chain to 94 restaurants. In February 2017, owners Kout Food Group sold the remaining 70 locations to Euro Garages who converted the buildings into Starbucks, Greggs, Subway or KFC franchises. After Euro Garages' licence to use the Little Chef name expired, the remaining 36 restaurants became EG Diner by February 2018, and were either converted or closed by the end of October 2018.

The defunct Little Chef brand is still owned by Kout Food Group; however, the trademark is now registered in Kuwait as the group is no longer operating in the United Kingdom.

== History ==
=== Beginnings and Lockhart (1958–1970) ===
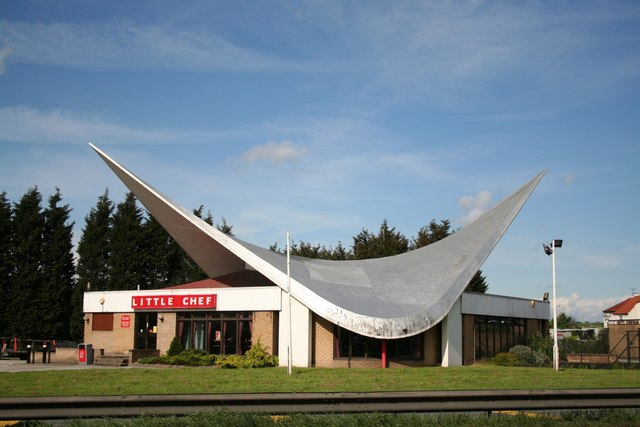
The Markham Moor Scorer Building on the A1 in Nottinghamshire. This building became Grade II listed shortly after Little Chef left the premises in early 2012.

In the 1930s, during the Great Depression, American lunch room operator Arthur Valentine created the concept of selling small prefabricated diners through mail order. These were called Valentine Diners, and various models were manufactured in Wichita, Kansas, later becoming famous landmarks across the U.S. Route 66. In 1958, British caravan designer Sam Alper was travelling the United States, and saw Valentine's 'The Little Chef' model in Leedey, Oklahoma, creating the British version of the Little Chef concept upon his return home.

On 22 July 1959, Alper founded Little Chef Limited. The first prototype Little Chef diner was created in Francis the Builders Yard on Armour Road, in Tilehurst, Reading, by Raymond Torin and Walter Cardy. The first Little Chef eventually opened on 17 June 1960 on Oxford Road, Reading in the car park of the former Rex Cinema, it had just eleven stools, and was supplied by a company called Lockhart. On 8 July 1960, the West London Observer reported on the Reading diner, and mentioned that Little Chef had ambitious plans to expand across the country with their pre-fabricated diners, measured at 30 feet long by 11 feet wide.

Throughout 1960, Little Chef opened other roadside diners in Biggleswade, Bedford, and Sherborne, Dorset. There was also an attempt at a high-street location, located at 70 High Street, Bedford, though this closed only after a few months of trading. In October 1960, Little Chef expanded into Antrim, Northern Ireland with a site on Belfast Road, Lisburn. In March 1961, another Little Chef roadside diner was opened in Camberley, Surrey.

It is understood that in the 1960s through the existing relationship with Lockhart, Sam Alper and Little Chef would form an alliance with caterer Peter Merchant; Lockhart had previously acquired Merchant's catering business. Little Chef would then become part of Lockhart also. Merchant's catering background and experience would then help Little Chef to further expand its presence, including a short-lived opening in 1964 in London's Regent's Park.

By 1970, Lockhart had been acquired by Trust Houses hotel, restaurant, and catering conglomerate, with the sale including Little Chef.

=== Trust House Forte (1970–1995) ===
In 1970, Trust Houses merged with Charles Forte's hotel and catering consortium to create Trust House Forte. The takeover by Forte gave Little Chef the capital and resources to expand rapidly. Soon, Trust House Forte had 44 Little Chef restaurants. As the success of Little Chef grew, standard décor and uniforms were brought in, together with staff training. Frustrated by planning laws, Forte began sending out teams to "well-located" transport cafes, offering the owners cash incentives to sell and move out "within the week" so that Forte could turn their restaurants into Little Chefs. Following this tactic, the chain, by 1972, had expanded to 100 outlets. In the 1970s, there were also two restaurants in France, both of which closed by 1976.

Sites were a mixture of self-service and waitress service, though predominantly the former. By 1976, there were 174 outlets, and the first Little Chef Lodge motel was opened. In 1977, "Jubilee Pancakes" were added to the menu.

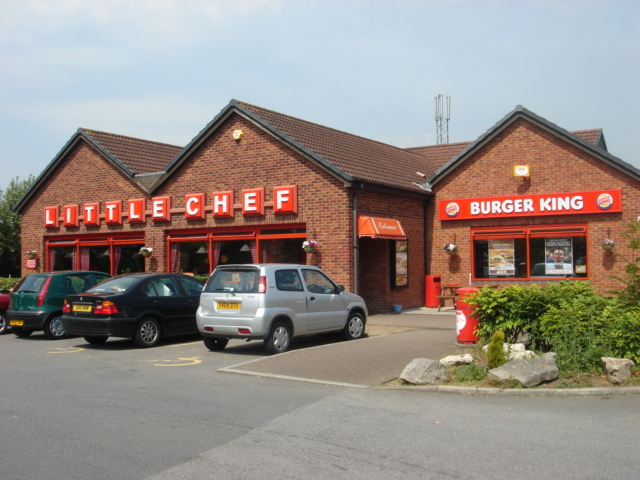
The former Bilbrough restaurant near York, co-branded with Burger King, on the A64 eastbound.

Little Chef outlets were opened at larger Trust House Forte service areas on motorways and trunk roads. In 1987, these service areas became known as Welcome Break after the acquisition of the smaller Welcome Break group of motorway service areas and the Happy Eater roadside restaurants, Little Chef's main rival at the time, in 1986, as part of the break-up of the Imperial Group.

In 1990, the Little Chef Lodges were rebranded as Travelodge. In 1992–3, two sites were opened in the Republic of Ireland. In 1995, Forte announced the end of the Happy Eater brand, with all existing sites converted into Little Chef by 1997.

Little Chef had a spin-off brand called "Little Chef Express," which Forte developed in 1995 as a rival to fast-food outlets. The first Express outlet was at the Markham Moor service station (A1 North), though only as an addition to the existing Little Chef menu there. Only five restaurants were ever built on the roadside, and the idea was redeveloped when Little Chef was taken over by Compass, with the Express take-outs being set up in food courts, including one in the Eurostar terminal.

=== Granada (1995–2000) ===
In 1996, catering and broadcasting conglomerate Granada successfully mounted a hostile takeover for the Forte group. The Welcome Break chain was sold by Granada, with the Little Chefs at those motorway service areas becoming a similar table-service restaurant, branded as Red Hen. High prices earned the chain the nickname "Little Thief".

In 1998, Granada bought AJ's Family Restaurants, another Little Chef rival, from the Celebrated Group and converted all of its fifteen sites to Little Chefs. AJ's had originally been set up in 1986 by two Happy Eater directors, following their sale to Forte.

=== Compass (2000–2002) ===
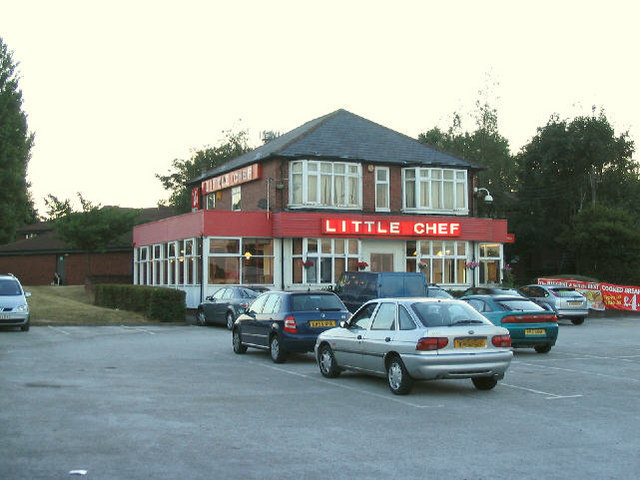
The former Eastham restaurant in Merseyside, pictured in 2006.

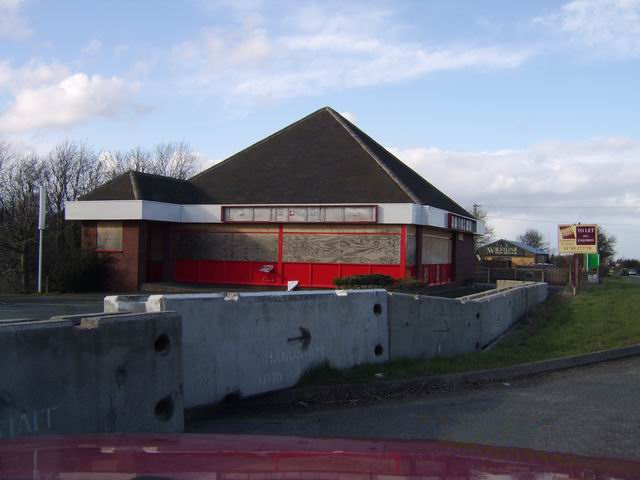
The former Leebotwood restaurant in Shropshire, pictured in 2006.

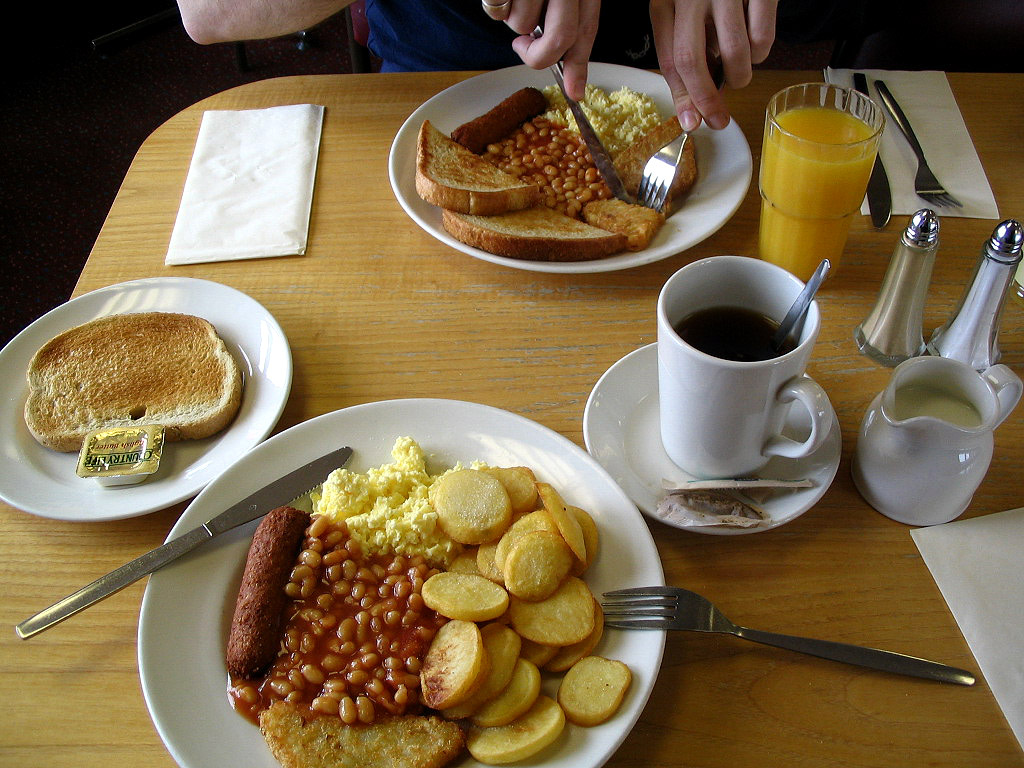
A Little Chef breakfast in 2007.

In 2000, Granada merged with the Compass Group to form Granada Compass, but the two demerged in 2001, leaving Little Chef as part of Compass. At about this time, some Little Chefs began serving Harry Ramsden's meals, a cross-branding exercise undertaken by Compass, who also owned Harry Ramsden's, though this serving ended in June 2004.

=== Permira (2002–2005) ===
The private equity investment company Permira bought Travelodge and Little Chef from Compass Group in December 2002 for £712 million, forming a special purpose vehicle called TLLC Group Holdings. The Little Chefs alongside Moto service station, formerly named Granada motorway service areas and owned by Compass until 2006, were owned by Moto and operated as franchised outlets.

In August 2004, Little Chef announced a plan to change its logo, to a slimmer version of "Fat Charlie," the chain's mascot. Little Chef's chief executive Tim Scoble said that this was "the start of a reimage programme for Little Chef" since the chain "has become a little bit dated", but now wishes to "take it forward into the 21st century". CEO Scoble added, "We get accusations that [Fat Charlie]'s overweight and a lot of people have also written in to say it was a small child carrying hot food, which they said was dangerous". However, the idea was dropped after 15,000 customers complained.

In 2005, it was announced by Permira that 130 under-performing restaurants were to be closed, reducing the chain to 234 restaurants. Prior to that, Compass had been gradually reducing the number of restaurants, from well over 400 at one time. During 2005, Travelodge Hotels Ltd (the new name for TLLC) made various announcements about the sale of some or all of the restaurants, until, in October 2005, the chain was sold to The People's Restaurant Group Ltd, who planned to "modernise" the restaurants and introduce self-service.

Also in 2005, the five Little Chef restaurants in Ireland were sold off to new operators, and the Little Chefs were rebranded. The two Dublin ones became "Metzo" restaurants, while the three others Eddie Rocket's restaurants.

=== The People's Restaurant Group (2005–2007) ===
In October 2005, Little Chef was sold to The People's Restaurant Group (owned by catering entrepreneurs Lawrence Wosskow and Simon Heath) for £58 million, but with Permira retaining Travelodge.

Upon purchasing the chain, Wosskow travelled to 220 of the 234 restaurants that were trading and spoke to both customers and staff at each location. Wosskow ultimately discovered that the buildings, facilities and equipment at every location needed major upgrades. As well as this, Wosskow and Heath learned that the existing Burger King franchises were trading well, but that a grab-and-go concept was also needed to compete with emerging takeaway businesses at forecourts.

In March 2006, The People's Restaurant Group sold 65 of its sites under a leaseback deal for £59 million to Israeli property group Arazim. The purpose of this deal was to generate enough funds to reinvest into upgrading the existing sites. Soon after this deal was launched, Little Chef opened its own coffee shop brand, "Coffee Tempo!" within several larger branches. These grab-and-go units were developed by Nick Smith, who had joined Little Chef as development director after previously leading the design and implementation of the Wild Bean Café format at BP petrol stations. Little Chef also introduced a takeaway menu.

The summer of 2006 saw poor weather which affected trading, as well as Wosskow suffering a near-fatal heart attack. As a consequence, Wosskow was told by doctors to avoid any stressful working environment and was forced to step away from the business entirely.

In December 2006, it was reported that Little Chef was undergoing serious financial problems; the business was said to be losing around £3 million a year and was struggling to keep up with rent payments. On 21 December, Little Chef announced it was in "urgent" rescue talks with a group of American investors, to secure funding. It had been suggested at the time that PricewaterhouseCoopers was on standby to act as administrators for the company; however, a source close to the company was quoted as saying, "We are still very hopeful that this situation can be resolved." At the time, The People's Restaurant Group was being advised by KPMG's corporate-recovery arm. On Christmas Eve 2006, Little Chef was taken into administration.

=== RCapital (2007–2013) ===
On 3 January 2007, Little Chef was rescued from administration by the private equity group RCapital, which paid "less than £10 million." Of the 235 branches, 38 were not included in the sale and were closed immediately, while the remaining ones continued to operate normally.

By December 2007, a number of sites not leased from Travelodge or Arazim, Little Chef's two main landlords, closed, as Little Chef had not been able to reach an agreement with them. All the franchised outlets at Moto sites closed down between 2008 and 2010, many of which being replaced by Costa Coffee.

In April 2008, RCapital recruited Ian Pegler to lead as the CEO of Little Chef. Pegler had previously worked for Little Chef and Happy Eater under Trust House Forte.

In January 2009, celebrity chef Heston Blumenthal appeared in a Channel 4 documentary, Big Chef Takes On Little Chef, to revamp the Little Chef chain; the programme was broadcast from 19 to 21 January, and involved Blumenthal introducing a new menu and organising a refit at the village of Popham outlet, near Basingstoke. The trial was successful, with a promise from the owner that none of the dishes would change without Blumenthal's consent. Heston Blumenthal returned to Popham in February 2009 to review progress, and the owner promised that, if there was a profit within three months, the redesigned format would be spread to all branches. Furthermore, two more former Little Chef branches, in Ings and Malton. would reopen. It was later announced that a further two Little Chefs, at York and Kettering, would be refurbished in the style of the trial in Popham.

In 2011, a further ten new concept restaurants opened at Doncaster, Markham Moor North, Shrewsbury, Black Cat, Fontwell, Weston on the Green North, Wisley South, Ilminster, Podimore and Amesbury with a view to investing £20 million in updating the brand across the estate. New menus had been introduced and restaurants had been refurbished based on the style which Blumenthal designed in 2009. A full rebranding exercise was undertaken by venturethree, which was hailed as a "success" by the graphic design sector. As part of its modernisation, the company used its new branding to create a presence on Facebook. and Twitter.

A Good-to-Go deli offering was introduced in the new concept restaurants, making bespoke sandwiches as well as takeaway meals appealing to customers on the move. Good-to-Go's sat alongside the traditional sit-down Little Chef format.

In May 2011, the company reported a 47% increase in food sales.

On 11 January 2012, Little Chef announced it planned to close 67 of "failing" restaurants, that would result in the loss of up to 600 jobs. On 7 February 2012, RCapital announced it was putting the Little Chef chain through "a pre-pack administration to offload a number of toxic leases". Graham Sims, the chairman of Little Chef, said that suppliers and other unsecured creditors would suffer from the decision to put the chain through this process, which had been taken "reluctantly." He expected job losses to be at the lower end of the previously announced range of "500 to 600." The business was to refocus on a core of 95 profitable sites.

By January 2012, 11 Little Chefs had been converted to the Blumenthal format.

In April 2012, chairman Graham Sims stated, "Everyone remembers Little Chef from the 1970s, with curtains at the windows and wooden tables. It worked well for twenty or thirty years but frankly it hasn't kept pace with the evolution of the retail market. It lost its way. We've gone through three or four owners in 10 years and none of them have really taken the tough decisions to sort out the assets, the cost base, and bring up the offer for the 21st century." In Sims' view, some of the owners had treated the company as "a cash cow, looking for the traditional quick in and out".

In May 2012, Little Chef closed its headquarters in Sheffield, outsourcing its operational day-to-day support to Lt Pubs Limited in Norfolk, as well as its marketing and PR to Parker Hobart. The Barnsdale Bar South branch closed in 2012; however, for a short time, the former restaurant would house Little Chef's IT department. In September 2012, the company announced plans to entirely franchise.

In April 2013, RCapital announced it would seek a buyer for the Little Chef business of 78 outlets, from Scotland to Cornwall, all of which were claimed to be profitable, a claim denoting an ostensible successful restructuring. The sale was expected to have a price tag of "tens of millions of pounds."

In June 2013, Little Chef announced that it was dropping Heston Blumenthal's creations from its menus. Little Chef spokesman Richard Hillgrove was quoted as saying, "Heston originally approached us to do his Channel 4 show about how he was going to save Little Chef. It seemed like a good idea at the time. But he took everything away from its core."

=== Kout Food Group (2013–2017) ===
In August 2013, RCapital sold Little Chef to Kuwaiti firm Kout Food Group for £15 million. Kout Food Group was the only bidder that was interested in retaining the Little Chef brand, as other bidders were believed to have included McDonald's, KFC and Costa Coffee, who wanted to rebrand the sites. Upon purchasing the chain, chairwoman Fadwa Al-Homaizi remarked that Kout Food Group had plans to "revitalise" the chain. Kout Food Group would begin implementing more Burger King franchises at the sites, as well as introducing Subway.

In August 2014, Little Chef attracted headlines when Prince Philip, Duke of Edinburgh, stopped off at the Little Chef at Doncaster on route to a private engagement.

In May 2016, it was announced that the Little Chef restaurant in Warminster would undergo a considerable renovation.

In August 2016, Little Chef ran their 'The Summer of Big Wins' competition, encouraging families to stop off during the busy summer trading period. Around the same time, the Chippenham branch was closed and converted into a standalone Burger King, leaving Little Chef with a portfolio of eight independent Burger King franchises. These locations included Whitemare Pool, Rusington, Rugeley, Saltash (all of which also housed Subway franchises), North Muskham, Chesterfield, and Halkyn.

In January 2017, it emerged that Kout Food Group were looking to sell Little Chef, having discussions with a number of interested buyers.

=== Euro Garages and closure (2017–2018) ===
On 1 February 2017, Kout Food Group completed a deal to sell all 70 Little Chef sites to Euro Garages for £16 million, along with one year's license for them to operate under the Little Chef brand. The sale also included eight former Little Chef sites that had been transformed into standalone Burger King locations. The vision for Euro Garages was to convert, by January 2018, all Little Chef sites to their franchise partner brands, such as Starbucks and Greggs.

“As you might have heard in the news, Little Chef has recently joined the Euro Garages family. This site will undergo a complete refurbishment into a Starbucks coffee shop which will open in May 2017. We have been serving you our delicious Olympic breakfasts, Works Burgers and Pancakes since the 80's and we have done this with all the passion and pride our staff could give you. We would like to thank you for your valued custom over the years. As always, and since 1958, we wish you a safe journey home.”

—Notice at Balhaldie South restaurant, which closed in March 2017.

Immediately upon purchasing the sites, operations at Euro Garages removed alcohol from sale, due to their owners' policy and ethical concerns regarding serving alcohol to motorists, as well as reducing many of the sites' operating hours from closing at 10 pm, to closing at 3 pm. Sites such as in Winterbourne Abbas, Axminster, and Dolgellau, closed soon after the acquisition. In July 2017, Euro Garages closed two prime locations, the Blumenthal-remodelled in Popham, and in Barton Stacey.

During that period, the Little Chef brand suffered online criticism in platforms such as Tripadvisor, with complaints concerning "poor quality" food and the buildings not being kept clean. There were also complaints from Little Chef staff that they were not being kept informed on the transformation process regarding their sites, and that their long-standing service to Little Chef had been ignored.

The closure process of Little Chef was scheduled to be complete before the end of 2017, but was postponed until early 2018 due to timing problems. The license agreement for the brand expired at the end of January 2018, causing Euro Garages to temporarily rename all remaining Little Chef locations to "EG Diner" until they could be converted into their partner brands. All EG Diners that were not rebranded were closed by the end of October 2018.

== Legacy ==
The defunct brand is currently owned by Kout Food Group, which also own the Happy Eater and Coffee Tempo! trademarks. Accounts previously filed show an interest in franchising the Little Chef brand in the future.

In 2019, Edwin Coe, then solicitors for Kout Food Group, threatened to sue chef Matei Baran if he did not cease his £600 application for a "Big Chef, Little Chef" trademark for an upcoming book. Baran changed the title to Big Chef, Mini Chef. Later in 2019, a company called "Little Chef Ltd" was ordered to have its name changed.

Until October 2022, the Little Chef website remained operational, still featuring the 2015 menu and a list of locations, all of which had closed.

In November 2022, Loungers announced they were launching Brightside Roadside Dining to fill the gap in the market created by the demise of Little Chef and Happy Eater. In February 2023, the company's first roadside diner opened in a former Little Chef unit on the A38 to Exeter in Kennford, Devon.

In April 2024, BBC Radio 4 produced a 25-minute programme about the history of Little Chef, as part of their series about defunct brands.

=== In popular culture ===
The 1998 British comedy film Still Crazy makes repeated reference to a band member overdosing in a Little Chef.

Cabaret group Fascinating Aïda have performed a comic song about the franchise, called "Little Chef".

A December 2004 episode of the British sitcom Max and Paddy's Road to Nowhere featured the Haydock Little Chef in which Billy 'The Butcher' Shannon (Craig Cheetham) threatens the waitress (Alex Hall) with a gun in order for him and his friends to be served after closing time.

In December 2024, the Christmas Day special and final episode of Gavin & Stacey included a nostalgic reference to the former Little Chef in Feering, which was revealed to be the first job of the main character, Smithy, as a pot washer.
