= Cafe (British) =

Small eatery in the United Kingdom

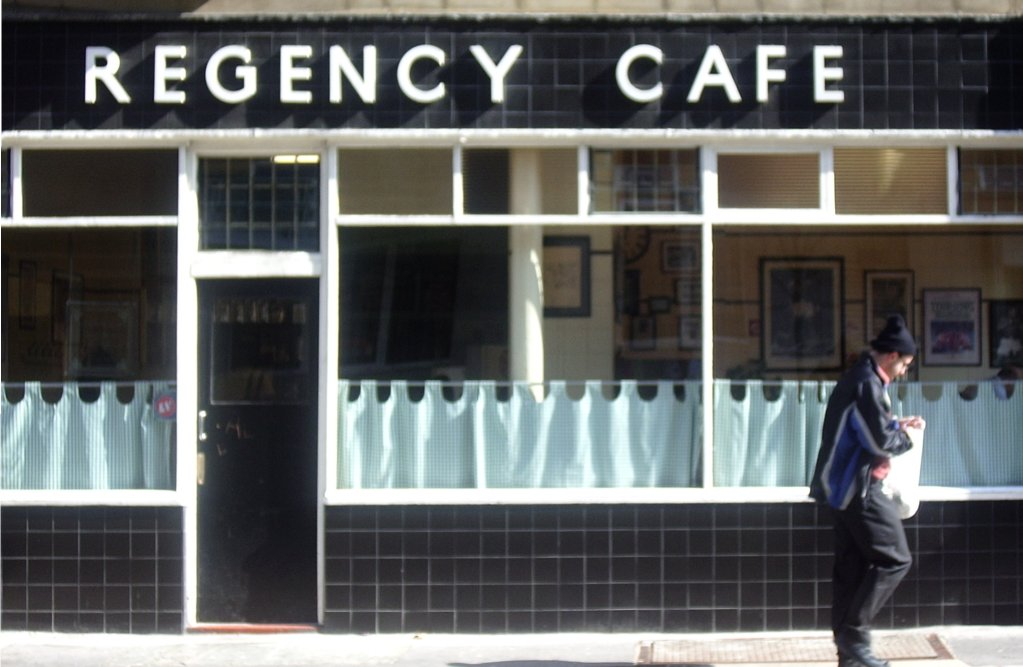
The Regency Cafe in Pimlico, London, is a well-preserved Art Deco-style 1940s British cafe.

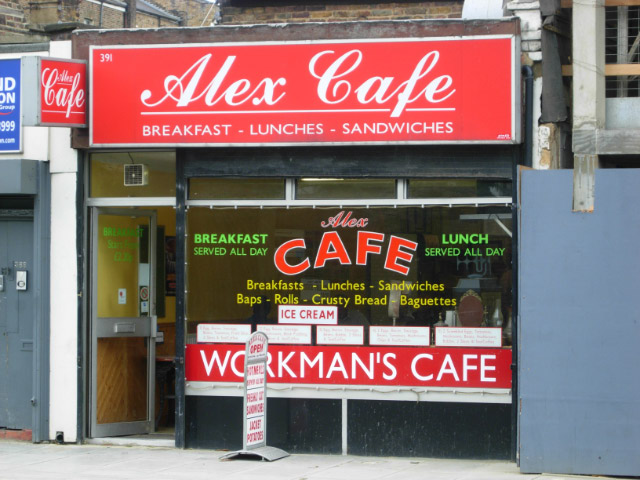
A modern example of a British cafe. Note the "breakfast served all day" sign displayed in the window.

In Britain, a cafe or café (/ˈkæfeɪ/), also known colloquially as a caff or greasy spoon, is a small eatery typically specialising in fried foods or home-cooked meals.

Though it uses the same word origin as the term "café", it is distinct from the more European style of coffeehouse or bar. A British cafe does not usually serve alcohol. It is commonly an independently owned business; the only notable chain of roadside cafes is OK Diner since the demise of Happy Eater in 1997 and Little Chef in 2018.

== Menu ==
A British cafe typically offers fried or grilled food such as an all-day "full cooked breakfast", which may contain a combination of ingredients such as fried egg, bacon, black pudding, bubble and squeak, hash browns, baked beans, fried bread, toast, grilled tomato, burgers, sausages, mushrooms and chips. Hot and cold sandwiches may be available, such as a bacon butty or sausage sandwich. A range of other cooked meals may be available, such as steak and kidney pie, a full roast, liver and onions, or pasta dishes, with a cooked dessert such as apple crumble and custard.

The main drink in a cafe or greasy spoon is usually tea, especially "builder's tea" (a nickname for a mug of strong black tea, such as English breakfast tea, usually served with milk and sugar and typically robust and flavourful with a brisk character and a dark red colour). However, coffee is also available and some cafes have espresso machines, particularly if they are Italian or Greek owned.

== Transport cafe ==
The cafe was the mainstay of British lorry drivers who travelled the major trunk roads such as the A1 and the A6 prior to the opening of the motorways. These cafes were not only stops where the driver could eat, but also made convenient meeting places where the trade unions could talk to their members. A cafe that is beside a main road and serves passing motorists, particularly lorry drivers, is sometimes known as a transport cafe; this may or not be accompanied by a petrol station. A motorway service station will typically include one or more fast food restaurants such as Burger King, Greggs, or McDonald's, and possibly a transport cafe for the lorry drivers.

== Notable British cafes ==
- Ace Cafe, a historic transport cafe
- Pete's Eats Cafe
- Regency Cafe

== See also ==
- All-day café
- Board game café
- Coffeeshop (Netherlands)
- Crisis cafe
- Diner
- Internet café
- Kissaten
- Konditorei
- Kopi tiam
- Maid café
- Manga cafe
- Ottoman coffeehouse
- Parisian café
- Sidewalk cafe
- Teahouse
- Viennese coffee house
