= Griff's Hamburgers =

American fast food chain

Coordinates: 35°4′25.2″N 106°33′6.7″W

"Griffy" exhorted patrons to stock up on fifteen-cent hamburgers

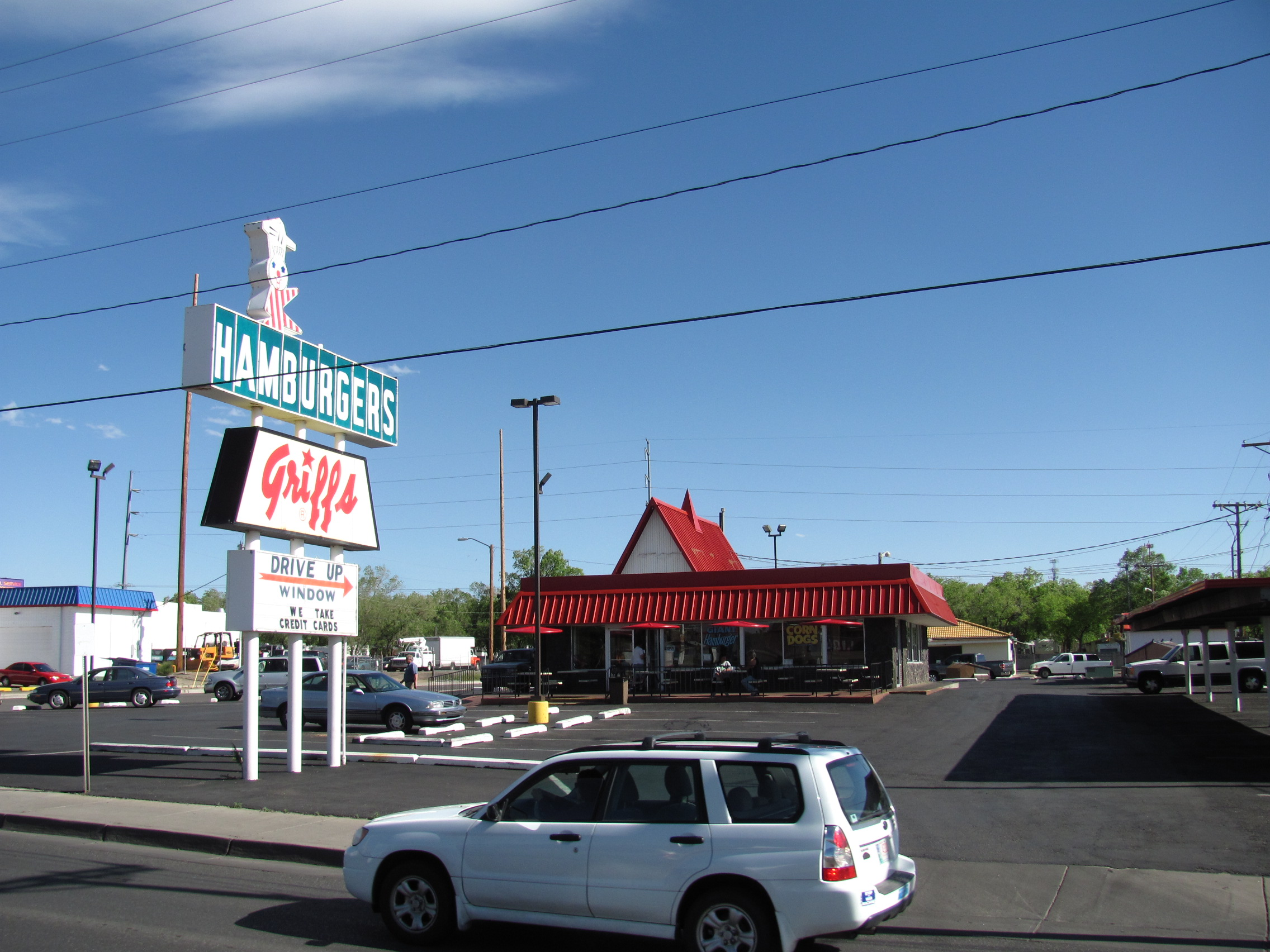
Griff's in Albuquerque, New Mexico

Griff's Hamburgers, or Griff's Burger Bar, is a regional fast food chain founded in 1960 by Griff's of America, Inc. of Kansas City, Missouri, United States and opened their first location in Wichita, Kansas. At one time, they had locations nationwide with the majority in the South near highway exits.

Griff's was named for the founder, HJ Griffith.

The restaurant buildings were of a patented A-frame design, produced by Valentine Diner of Wichita, Kansas. Later restaurants sported more conventional architecture. A bright yellow sign read HAMBURGERS in big block capitals. The restaurants offered both drive-thrus and patio dining. Most of the stores were located in high traffic locations, such as near a highway off-ramp or along Route 66. Some Griff's locations have been demolished and rebuilt for a more modern appearance.

Cory Griffin, the great-grandson of founder Harold J. Griffith, relocated the Griff's corporate headquarters to Dallas, Texas. Stores remain open in Bossier City, Ruston and Shreveport, Louisiana; Albuquerque, New Mexico; and Dallas, Fort Worth, Haltom City, Garland, Irving, Mesquite, and San Antonio, Texas. A location in Sedalia, Missouri closed in late 2011, and locations in Colorado closed in 2015. The Albuquerque location closed in July 2023 due to safety concerns. Shortly after, the building was demolished.

The restaurant chain was featured in multiple installments of the Zippy the Pinhead comic strip; on November 15, 2004, February 10, 2005, December 19, 2006, September 2, 2007, and February 3, 2025.

== See also ==
- List of hamburger restaurants
