= Regency Cafe =

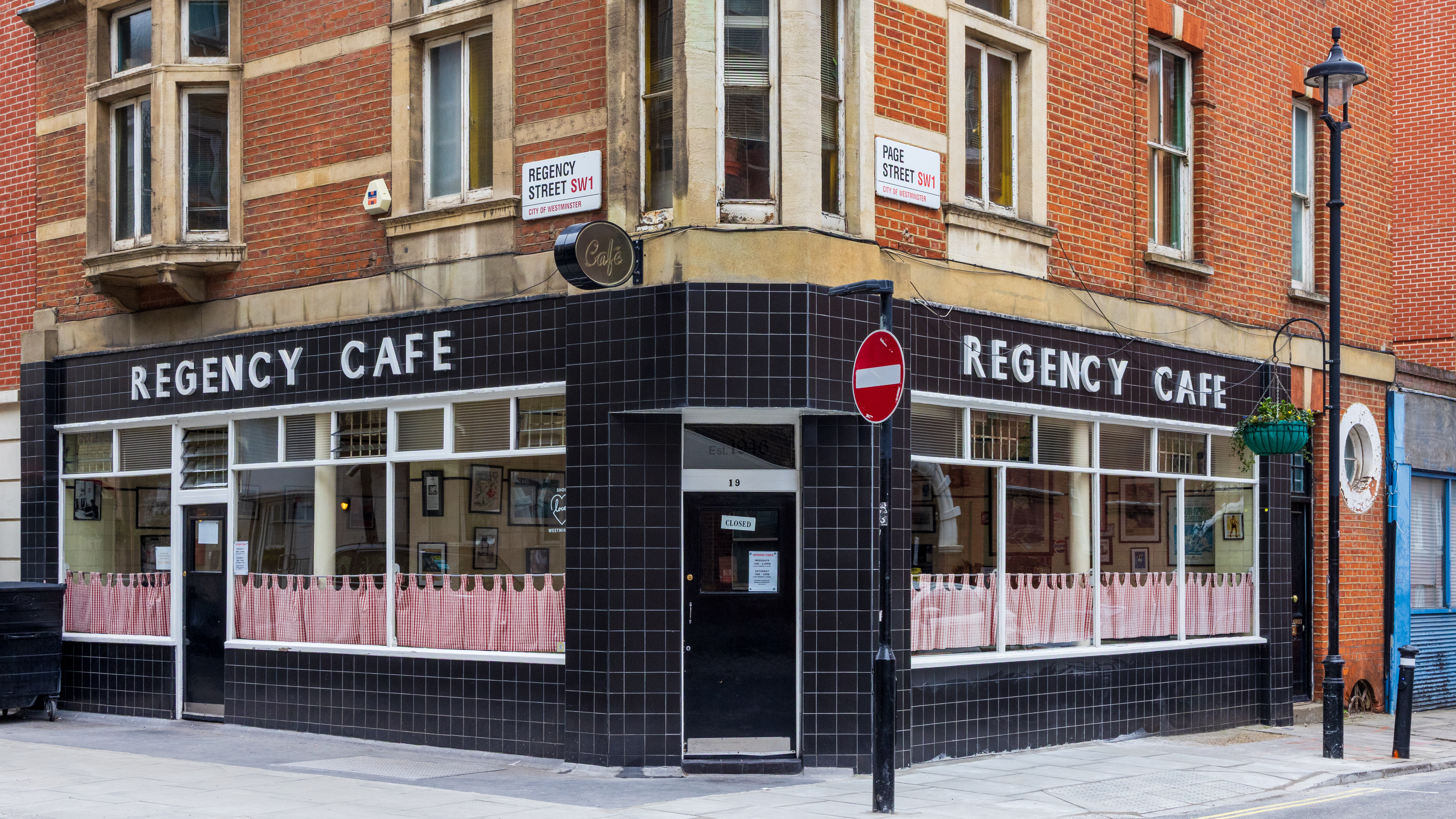
- The exterior of the Regency Cafe

- Location within London

Restaurant information
- Established: 1946
- Owners: Fevzi and Zafer Gungor
- Food type: British cafe
- Dress code: Casual
- Location: 17–19 Regency Street, London, SW1P 4BY, United Kingdom
- Coordinates: 51.494001°N 0.132195°W
- Reservations: No
- Website: https://regencycafe.co.uk/

The Regency Cafe is an art deco style British cafe in Regency Street, London. It first opened in 1946, and has been used as a filming location on several occasions. In 2013, it was voted the fifth best restaurant in London by users of Yelp.

== Description ==
Regency Cafe opened in 1946 on Regency Street in London, near the border of Westminster and Pimlico. The business was sold in 1986 to Italian immigrants Antonio Perotti and Gino Schiavetta. In 1994, management passed to Perotti’s daughter, Claudia, and Schiavetta’s son, Marco, who ran the cafe until their retirement in 2024. It closed briefly that year before reopening under new Turkish owners, Fevzi and Zafer Gungor.

The interior tiling is original, while the tables are newer and Formica topped. Interior decorations include photographs of Tottenham Hotspur football players. The cafe is designed in an art deco style.

The cafe has been featured as a filming location in several BBC series such as Judge John Deed, Rescue Me and London Spy. It has also appeared in the films Layer Cake, Brighton Rock, Pride, and Rocketman. In print, it has appeared in the Japanese version of the magazine Vogue and in a Volkswagen advertisement.

== Menu ==
Regency Cafe serves cuisine traditionally seen in a British cafe. It includes a variety of traditional breakfast food such as egg, bacon, sausage, beans, black pudding, tomatoes as well as newer additions such as eggs Benedict and hash browns. The tea served was described by Harry Wallop for The Daily Telegraph, as "Proper builders' tea, the stuff that once fuelled the docks, factories and steelworks of Britain; a mug of pure, liquid copper." Other items include a homemade steak pie and chips.

== Reception ==
In 2013, Regency Cafe was voted as the fifth best restaurant in London by users of the website Yelp. It had already been included in a list of the top five less expensive places to eat in the UK, also produced by Yelp for the Wall Street Journal. Harry Wallop, writing for The Daily Telegraph in April 2013, described Regency Cafe as the "real deal" when it came to retro style cafes. He praised the food served, saying that it was rough but tasted good. A Time Out review in April 2013 called the food "stodgetastic" and gave it a score of three out of five.
