= Kout Food Group =

Kuwaiti-based conglomerate

Kout Food Group K.S.C.C.
- Formerly: Al-Nowair Foodstuff Company (1981–1985); Al-Homaizi Foodstuff Co. (1985–2005)
- Type: Private
- Industry: Foodservice
- Founded: 1981
- Headquarters: Kuwait City, Kuwait
- Key people: Fadwa Al-Homaizi (Chairwoman)
- Brands: Al Nuwair Café; Al Nuwair Kitchens; Ayyame; Burj Al-Hamam; Fol O' Yasmine; Fleyfley; Fresh Productions; Kabab AlMoualem; Little Chef (defunct); Melting Point; Scoop A Cone; Shawarma Twist; Shawarma Abu Elez; Shawarma AlTaybeen; Speedy Bunny
- Website: koutfood.com

Kout Food Group K.S.C.C. (/kuːt/) is a Kuwaiti operator of food service providers and production facilities. It was founded in 1981 as Al-Nowair Foodstuff Company, and was renamed Al-Homaizi Foodstuff Co. from 1985 to 2005.

The group are best known for being the master franchisee of Burger King, Pizza Hut, Subway, Taco Bell, Applebee's and IHOP across Kuwait, and have formerly traded in Iraq, Qatar, the United Arab Emirates and the United Kingdom. From 2007 to 2016, the group were listed on the Kuwait Stock Exchange.

== History ==
=== Kuwait ===
In 1981, the group was originally known as Al-Nowair Foodstuff Company, and operated a restaurant chain in Kaifan called Bugsbunny, as well as having a franchise agreement with Pizza Hut. In 1984, the name of the restaurant chain was changed to 'Hungry Bunny', and in the year following the parent company's name was changed to Al-Homaizi Foodstuff Co. By 1990, there were 35 Hungry Bunny locations.

In 1997, the group acquired the Burger King franchise for Kuwait, rebranding the existing Hungry Bunny restaurants by 1998, and eventually growing to 61 locations across the country by June 2012. In 1999, the group acquired the Applebee's Kuwaiti franchise. In 2004, the group opened its own chain, Burj Al-Hamam. In 2005, a corporate restructure meant that Al-Homaizi Foodstuff Co. became a subsidiary of Kout Food Group. In 2007, Kout Food Group went public, becoming a subsidiary of the Al-Homaizi Company. In 2009, the group established Fresh Productions, in Sabhan, Kuwait. In 2010, the group began a franchise agreement with Taco Bell.

In September 2021, the group opened a new 16,000-square-metre warehouse in Sulaibiya. In February 2022, Subway agreed to a master franchise agreement with the group in Kuwait. In August 2022, the group was awarded the BRC Global Standard certificate. In April 2023, the group opened Pizza Hut, Burger King and Subway at Kuwait International Airport. In May 2023, the group announced an agreement with IHOP, to incorporate IHOP concessions in its Applebee's locations in Kuwait.

== Former operations ==
=== United Arab Emirates, Qatar and Iraq ===
In August 2012, the group announced it would expand into the United Arab Emirates, Qatar and Iraq. In April 2014, the group opened the first Pizza Hut location in Iraq. In April and June 2015, the group opened the second and third Iraqi Pizza Hut locations.

=== United Kingdom ===
In July 2005, the group entered the UK market as a franchisee of Burger King. In November 2007, the group acquired the Maison Blanc patisserie chain of outlets and its Park Royal production facility, rescuing it from Lyndale Foods who later collapsed into administration. In May 2008, alongside Alan Yau, it would create the fast-casual Chinese noodle bar concept, Cha Cha Moon; which opened its inaugural location in London's Kingly Court. A second Cha Cha Moon location was attempted in the declining Whiteleys Shopping Centre, however Kout created the Cafe Licious, Chi Wok and Pasta Rossa brands to replace it, in an attempt to attract a wider audience. Later in 2008, Kout opened its fast-casual Italian dining concept called Kitchen Italia in the Westfield Shopping Centre and Covent Garden. In June 2012, the group added KFC to its UK portfolio, acquiring a number of locations. In March 2013, the Kitchen Italia restaurants would cease, citing low trade.

In August 2013, the group acquired the Little Chef restaurant chain, alongside the trademarks for the former Happy Eater and Coffee Tempo! brands, purchased from private-equity firm RCapital for £15 million. The group were reported to be the only bidder who wanted to retain the Little Chef brand, as other bidders wanted to redevelop the sites. This purchase also included a number of Burger King locations which were attached to the Little Chef properties, with the group continuing to add Burger King and Subway locations to the sites after its purchase. In 2013 and 2014, the group acquired a number of Costa Coffee franchises.

In January 2016, the group began to show signs of leaving the UK, first by closing its Whiteleys location, and then selling Cha Cha Moon's Kingly Court building lease later that September. In December 2016, there were talks Patisserie Valerie would purchase Maison Blanc from Kout Food Group, however these talks fell through, with Maison Blanc closing down completely a few months later. In February 2017, Euro Garages purchased the locations used by the Little Chef chain for £16 million, which it would then convert into its franchise partner brands by October 2018, with Kout Food Group retaining ownership of the Little Chef brand. In September 2017, the group sold its KFC franchises to The Herbert Group. In February 2019, its UK head office and former production facility in Park Royal was sold to Joe and Seph's. In January 2020, the group sold its remaining Burger King locations to BK UK, and then left the UK market completely in August 2020 by selling off its Costa Coffee franchises to Gerry's Offshore UK.
