= Maison Blanc =

British bakery chain

- Industry: Pâtisserie, café
- Founded: 1981
- Founder: Raymond Blanc
- Defunct: March 2017
- Owner: Kout Food Group K.S.C.C. (trademarks)

Maison Blanc was a British bakery chain, founded by Raymond Blanc in 1981.

== History ==
In May 1999, Lyndale Foods purchased Maison Blanc for £12 million. At this point, it was the UK's second largest bakery chain.

In 2007, Kuwaiti firm Kout Food Group rescued Maison Blanc, as Lyndale Foods began to struggle financially.

In the year ending 31 December 2014, Maison Blanc had reported a loss of nearly £3 million.

== Closure ==
In September 2016, Kout Food Group hired a property agent to carry out a strategic review of the 13 Maison Blanc locations and production facility. In December 2016, there were rumours that rival, Patisserie Valerie, would purchase the chain, but with Kout Food Group retaining the brand name.

In March 2017, the chain was closed by Kout Food Group as they began to withdraw from the UK market, with all locations closed down.

In July 2017, it was announced that Patisserie Valerie would move into four former Maison Blanc locations.

In February 2019, Maison Blanc's former production facility was sold to Joe & Seph's. The office space above had served as the UK headquarters for Kout Food Group.
