= Happy Eater =

Defunct British roadside restaurant chain

- Industry: Roadside restaurant chain
- Founded: 1973
- Founder: Sir Michael Pickard
- Defunct: 1997
- Fate: Merged into Little Chef
- Owner: Kout Food Group K.S.C.C. (trademarks)

Happy Eater was a chain of restaurants in England and Wales. Founded by Sir Michael Pickard in 1973, the chain wanted to compete against the British roadside restaurant category killer at the time, Little Chef. The chain was acquired by Little Chef's parent company, Trusthouse Forte, in August 1986.

In January 1996, Granada purchased Trusthouse Forte, which led to a streamlining programme converting all Happy Eater sites to the Little Chef brand, with some larger sites also having Burger King franchises introduced to them.

== History ==
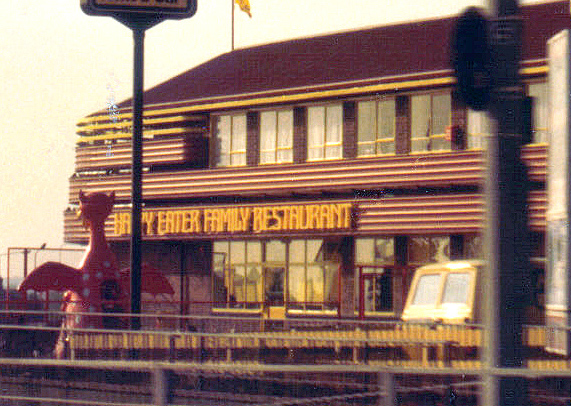
The former Happy Eater at Apex Corner, located on the outskirts of London.

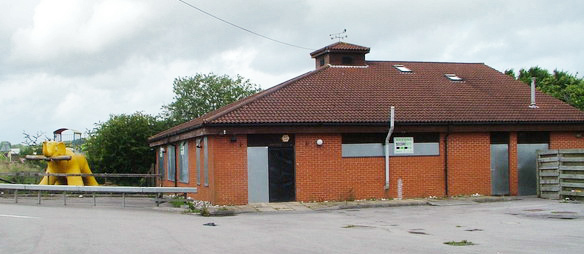
An abandoned Happy Eater near Warminster, with its fibreglass animal playground equipment retained.

In 1973, a former managing director of the hotel group Trusthouse Forte, Michael Pickard, founded a family-orientated roadside restaurant, aimed at competing with the established pre-eminent chain in the industry, Little Chef. The company's first major move was converting Welcome Break restaurants into Happy Eater locations in the 1970s. The restaurants offered similar fare to Little Chef, such as offering English breakfasts and fish and chips. A distinctive difference to customers between the two chains was that Happy Eater provided fibreglass animal-themed playground equipment for children. Outlets were mostly located in the Midlands and the South East of England, with many locations situated along the A1 road corridor.

=== First establishments ===
The first establishment was in May 1973 at the former Crossways Cafe at Send, Surrey, It was followed by an 80-seat restaurant at Charing on the A20, then Handcross, at Seale, Surrey on the A31, and then Felbridge on the A22 in Surrey.

The Hindhead site on the A3 was built in 1976. Hindhead was the training headquarters.

In 1980, the brand further expanded when its 21 locations were sold to the Imperial Group. Not long after this, a partnership with Esso garages was formed, which saw a rapid increase of new roadside locations throughout the 1980s.

Leicester Forest East services had the first site at a motorway service area in 1983, on the northbound carriageway. Red Lodge, Suffolk, on the A11, at the former Dorothea's and Snug for 23 years, with planning being approved in April 1983, known as Freckenham, opened around 1983; it was often burgled, and closed by the early 1990s. Barton Turn, on the A38, had the planning approved late October 1983, and opened in June 1984.

On April 3 1985 Princess Michael of Kent was flown in by helicopter to open the 50th restaurant at Wisley on the A3. The opening was arranged by David Wynne-Morgan.

Imperial Group would expand the chain to 75 restaurants, before selling the chain in August 1986 to Trusthouse Forte, owners of Little Chef. Trusthouse Forte continued to expand the Happy Eater chain alongside Little Chef.

=== Decline ===
In January 1996, Granada purchased Forte, as it had become known, and began to streamline their business by converting the Happy Eater locations to the Little Chef brand. The final three Happy Eaters to convert to the Little Chef fascia were Capel St Mary, and Colsterworth North and South, whilst Fleet Hargate was sold off..

The phase away from Happy Eater helped Little Chef reach its peak of 439 restaurants. This would prove challenging for Little Chef, as some Happy Eater locations were originally built to compete with Little Chef, meaning now the restaurants were now directly competing with themselves. This ultimately meant Little Chef would close many locations throughout the 2000s as a result of falling profits.

The defunct Happy Eater brand is currently owned by Kuwaiti firm Kout Food Group, who were the last organisation to license out the Little Chef name until January 2018. The group left the UK market in 2020, meaning the Happy Eater trademark is now registered from Kuwait.

== Legacy ==
The 1986 film Mona Lisa features a scene filmed in a Happy Eater. The 1989 video game Fast Food was originally intended as a promotional tool for Happy Eater. The 2007 film Rise of the Footsoldier uses a location depicting the former Basildon branch of Happy Eater, set in the late 1980s.

Between July and August of 2018, an art exhibition based on the Happy Eater brand was held at Taco in London.

The 2020 Amazon series Truth Seekers features an abandoned Happy Eater restaurant in its fifth episode. The Curse (2022) recreates a Happy Eater for a scene in its last episode.

In November 2022, Loungers announced they were launching Brightside to fill the gap in the market created by the demise of Little Chef and Happy Eater. In February 2023, their first location opened in a former Happy Eater building, situated near Exeter Racecourse.

The 2025 film 28 Years Later features a derelict Shell garage with a Happy Eater restaurant attached, and a track called "Happy Eater" features on the official orchestral score for the film, by Young Fathers.
