= Loungers =

Chain restaurant

Loungers Limited
- Type: Fast casual restaurant
- Industry: Cafes; Restaurants; Bars
- Founded: 2002
- Founder: Alex Reilley; David Reid; Jake Bishop
- Number of locations: 273 (Lounge); 37 (Cosy Club); 4 (Brightside)
- Area served: United Kingdom
- Owner: CF Exedra Topco Limited, Jersey, owned by funds managed by Fortress Investment Group
- Website: loungers.co.uk

Loungers Limited is a British cafe-bar and restaurant chain founded in 2002 by Alex Reilley, David Reid, and Jake Bishop, with over 250 locations in the United Kingdom with their headquarters in Bristol. The chain operates three brands: Lounge, Cosy Club and Brightside and is owned by funds managed by US-based private equity firm Fortress Investment Group.

== History ==
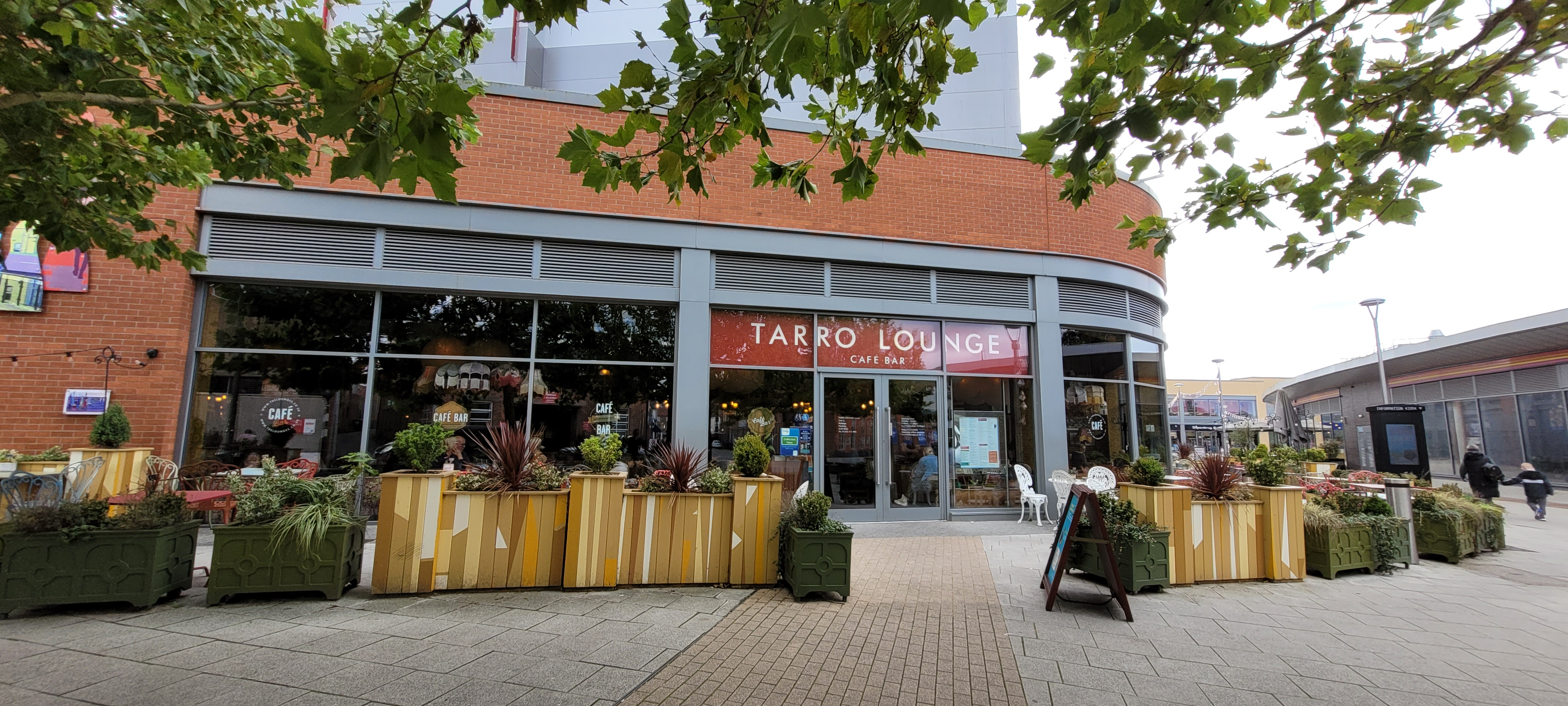
Tarro Lounge in Hinckley, Leicestershire.

Loungers was founded by Alex Reilley, David Reid, and Jake Bishop, who collectively put together £10,000 to open their first Lounge (which was aptly-named Lounge) inside of a former opticians unit on North Street in Bedminster, Bristol in August 2002. Their original business model was not meant to include food as it was only meant to operate as a bar, though it was later introduced. Five years later in 2007, after predominantly opening sites in England, they expanded into Wales, by opening Juno Lounge in Roath, Cardiff. On 10 May 2017, they opened their 100th site, Capo Lounge, in Mansfield, Nottinghamshire. On 13 September 2023, they opened their 200th site, Verdetto Lounge in Buckingham, Buckinghamshire.

=== Cosy Club ===
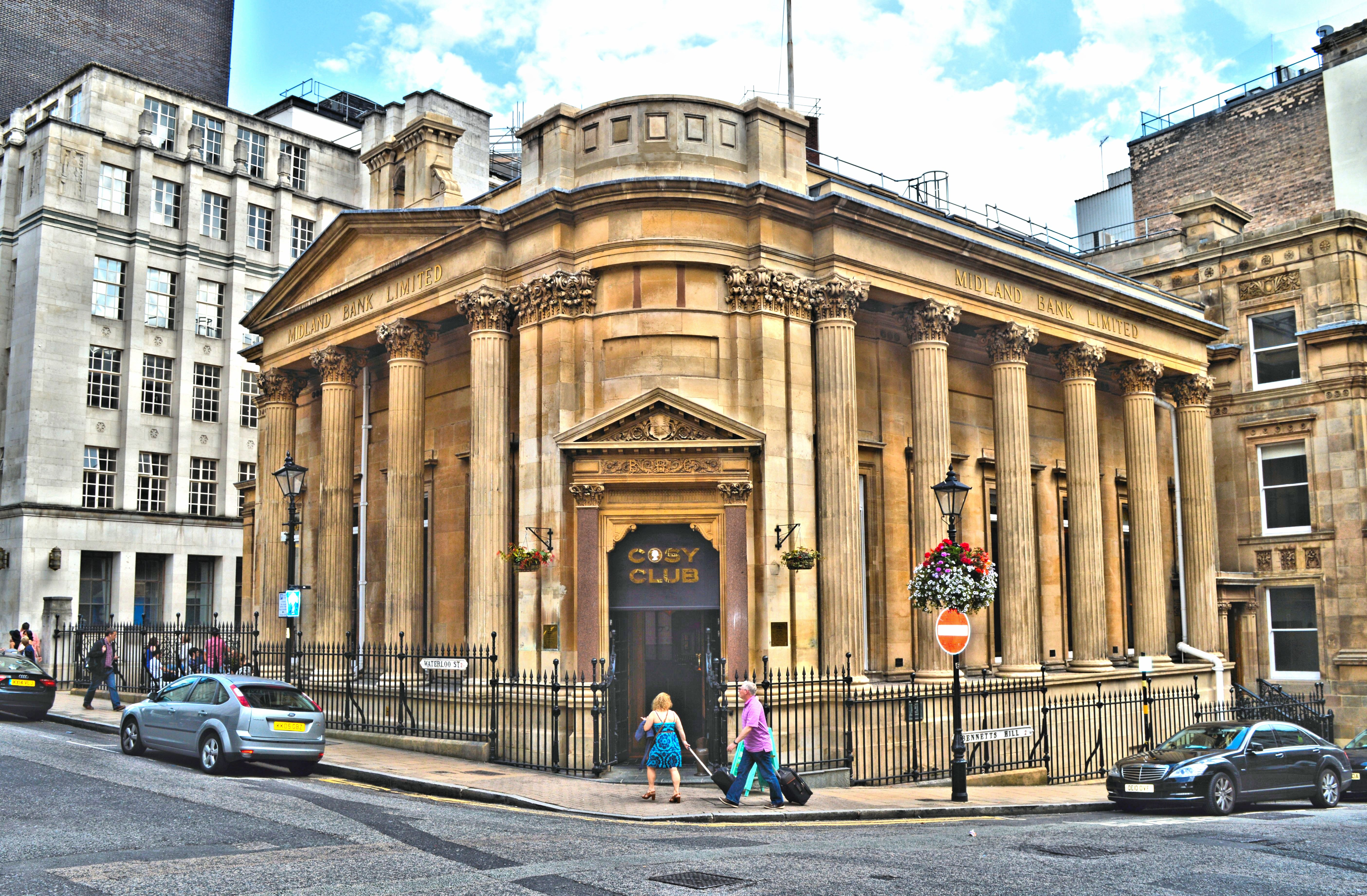
A Cosy Club in Birmingham, West Midlands.

In August 2010, Loungers announced plans to launch a new brand named Cosy Club, which operates in historic and listed buildings. The first branch to open was on 3 September 2010 in Taunton, Somerset. In January 2020, the largest Cosy Club restaurant to date opened, inside of a Grade II listed three-floor former casino building on Victoria Street in Nottingham, East Midlands, which was purchased for £1 million after sitting empty for 17 years.

=== Brightside ===
In November 2022, it was announced that Loungers would launch a new roadside dining brand named Brightside, which drew inspiration from the defunct Little Chef chain. Gary Lloyd of The Morning Advertiser suggested the brand is also reminiscent of Happy Eater. Loungers purchased three of the four restaurants used by American-diner chain Route Restaurants to convert into Brightside locations. The inaugural Brightside location opened in one of these in February 2023, the former Happy Eater/Little Chef on the A38 in Kennford, near Exeter Racecourse. As of November 2024, there are four Brightside locations across Cornwall, Devon and Rutland.

=== COVID-19 ===
In April 2020, during the then-ongoing coronavirus pandemic, Alex Reilley stated that their directors' pay had been cut by 50 per cent while their branches closed in March as a way of saving money. The chain's lending banks, Santander and the Bank of Ireland, agreed to provide them with a revolving credit of £15 million over the course of 18 months to manage their capital throughout the pandemic.

On 6 April 2021, as the pandemic conditions were easing up and businesses were re-opening, Reilley criticised the idea of government-introduced coronavirus passports having to be shown at bars and restaurants, saying the idea was "unreasonably targeting" the restaurant sector, and they should instead be shown at theatres, cinemas and sporting events, where tickets are already checked on entry. On 12 April, Loungers were able to re-open their sites in phases, with 47 English sites opening for takeaway and outdoor dining only during the third national lockdown, while five sites in Wales were permitted to re-open with the same rules on 26 April. All Lounges re-opened in May, and, by October 2021, their revenue had almost doubled.

== Investment ==
In April 2012, Piper Private Equity acquired a minority stake in Loungers, investing £16 million. In December 2016, Piper exited their investment following a £137 million deal with Lion Capital LLP who acquired a majority stake. During this time, Alex Reilley subsequently became the Executive Chairman. In February 2025, Fortress Investment Group acquired Loungers for USD$486 million.
