= Lawrence Wosskow =

British entrepreneur (born 1963)

- Born: July 5, 1963 (age 62)

Lawrence Wosskow (born 5 July 1963) is a British serial entrepreneur, mainly dealing in the dining and retail sectors.

== History ==
=== Early life ===
Wosskow attended Silverdale School in Sheffield, leaving in 1981 with 10 O-levels and 2 A-levels. He began working at Marks & Spencer after leaving school.

=== Career ===
Wosskow took advantage of catering in shopping centres, forming Out of Town Restaurants Group, the UK's largest shopping center caterer. He also owned Free Spirit, a chain of surf/outdoor retail stores; and the ice cream brands Loseley and Bradwells.

In 2005, Wosskow formed an agreement with Simon Heath to form The People's Restaurant Group, who would buy Little Chef from Permira later in that year.

In 2009, he began investing in UK commercial properties, including redeveloping Harrogate’s town centre.

Wosskow's book, Little Chef, the Heart of the Deal, was released on 28 November 2017.

Today, Wosskow runs a private equity company from the Bahamas, investing in tech businesses globally. Notable tech investments include: PopID, which uses face and palm outside the network to change the way we pay; Square Panda, which is changing the way children learn English throughout India; Pepper HQ, which allows customers to order and pay at the table in restaurants, bringing QuickPay to the market; Tradeshift, which is allowing companies to trade with each other more efficiently, and has joined forces with HSBC to form the world's largest trade bank; Soundtrack Your Brand, which is becoming the Spotify of music for the commercial world; Curve, which combines its customers' credit cards into one smart card; Betr, which is becoming the fastest growing sports betting app; CookUnity, which is changing the face of meals at home; Ubicquia, which is making our cities safer; Infinitio AI, bringing a safer and more secure AI to the market; and Apex AI, bringing movies to life.

Other investments include Fuel Venture Capital; Chris Sacca's Lowercarbon Capital, which invests in technologies that lower emissions, remove carbon, actively cool the planet, and save human, animal, and plant life; Wavemaker Fund; and Holt Xchange, based in Montreal, helping young tech businesses come to fruition.
