= Waskow =

Waskow is a surname. Notable people with the surname include:

- Arthur Waskow (1933–2025), American author, political activist, and rabbi
- Dieter Waskow (born 1957), German diver
- Henry T. Waskow (1918–1943), American World War II captain
- Thomas C. Waskow (born 1947), American Air Force officer
