= Valentine Diner =

American cafe

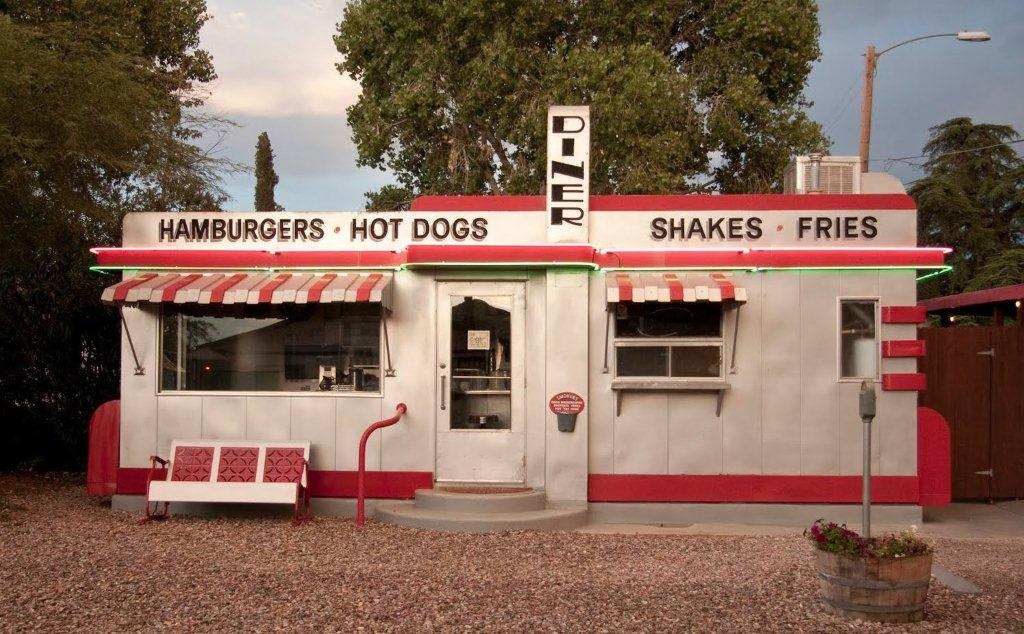
Valentine diner on old Route 66 in Valentine, Arizona

A Valentine Diner was a prefabricated mail order small diner produced in Wichita, Kansas after the Great Depression. The concept was created by Arthur Valentine in the 1930s, who had experience operating lunch rooms. Originally the diners were manufactured by the Ablah Hotel Supply Company.

In 1947, manufacturing was taken over by the Valentine Manufacturing Company. After World War II and the implementation of the Interstate Highway System in the U.S. in the late 1950s, prefabricated diners saw a boom in business as motorists took to the roads in greater numbers for longer journeys and would stop for a meal. Valentine Diners were produced until the 1970s, and several survive as operating business (sometimes as a restaurant, sometimes as other businesses) around the United States today. A few have become historical roadside attractions, such as along historic Route 66.

At least twelve different Valentine Diners styles were produced. Diners can be identified by either their wall safe, which will have a Valentine logo (a heart with an arrow through it), or the Valentine diner steel serial number plate, which has the word “Valentine” written on it.
