= Builder's tea =

British colloquial term for strong tea

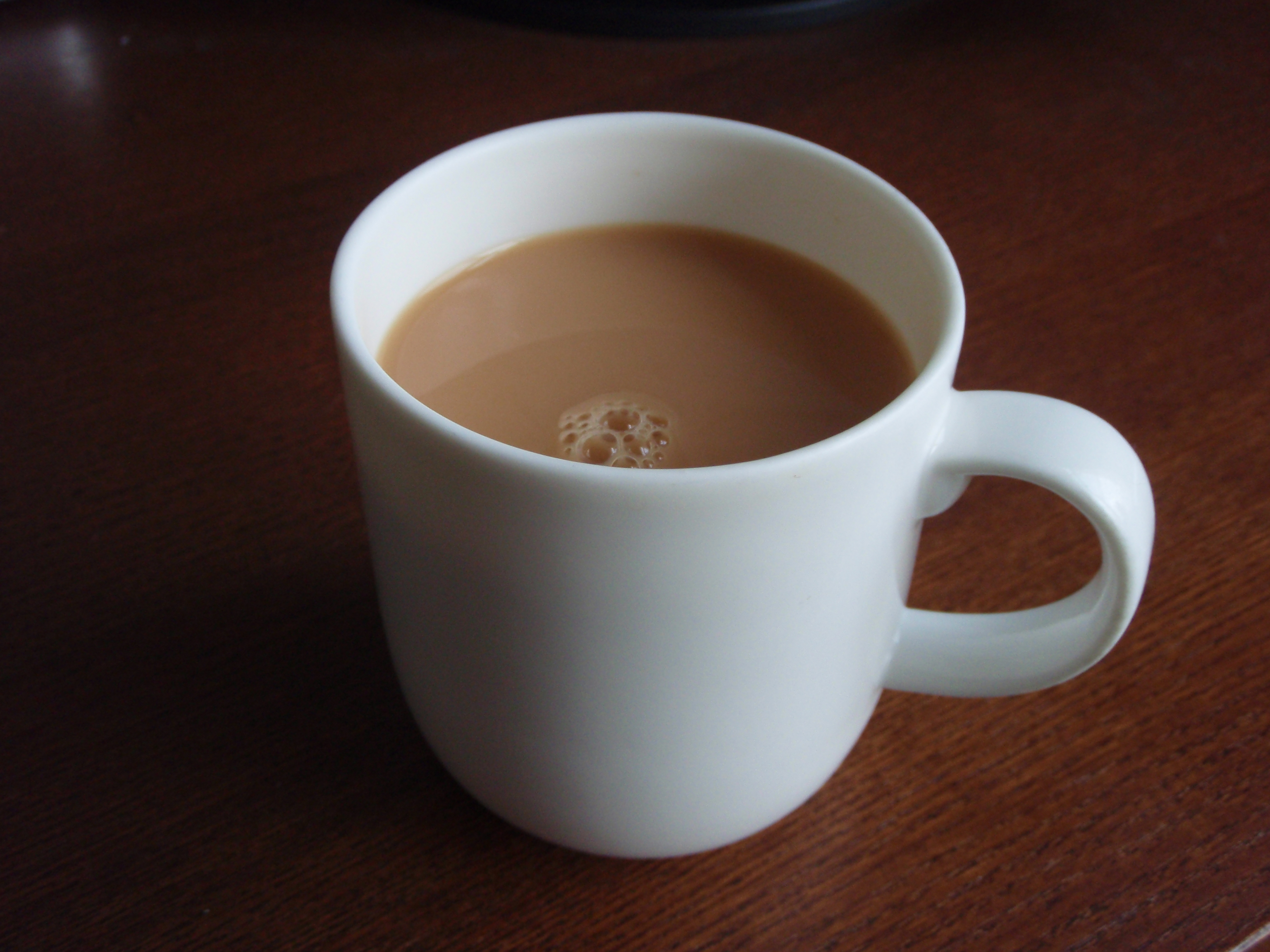
Builder's tea refers to a strong cup of tea.

Builder's tea, also known as a builder's brew or gaffer's tea, is a British English colloquial term for a strong cup of black tea. It takes its name from the inexpensive tea commonly drunk by labourers taking a break. A builder's tea is typically brewed in a mug with the tea contained in a teabag (as opposed to loose leaves in a teapot), with milk added, either after the tea is stirred or after it is steeped. Builder's tea is also often sweetened with one or two teaspoons of white sugar.

Builder's tea is typically robust and has a rich, dark beige colour. The name was chosen because workers in the British building trade typically drink many cups of tea during their working day. The term has widespread use throughout both Great Britain and Ireland. Research from the Social Issues Research Centre found that people performing construction work found tea "both soothing and stimulating".

== See also ==
- Tea in the United Kingdom
