= Jessica Leigh Jones =

Welsh engineer and astrophysicist

Jessica Leigh Jones MBE
- Born: 22 July 1994 (age 32)
- Education: Willows High School; Cardiff University (BSc)
- Occupations: Engineer and Director
- Scientific career
- Workplaces: Sony; University of Wales Trinity St David; Institute for Apprenticeships and Technical Education
- Website: www.jessicaleighjones.co.uk

Jessica Leigh Jones MBE (born 1994) is a Welsh engineer and astrophysicist from Cardiff. She is credited with becoming the first female to win the UK Young Engineer of the Year Award in 2012 for her work designing a portable uterine contraction monitor which cut manufacturing costs by 99%. She was later rewarded for her efforts to commercialise the technology, receiving the Institution of Engineering and Technology (IET) Intel Inspiration Award for Entrepreneurship in the same year.

== Early life and education ==
Jones was born in Cardiff in 1994. As a young child, her father worked at MOD St Athan, Vale of Glamorgan, as an aircraft electrician. Jones attended Willows High School in Tremorfa, Cardiff until age 15, where she was taught electronics at GCSE level by Keith Allen, whom she described as one of her role models. She studied Astrophysics at Cardiff University graduating with a Bachelor of Science degree in 2015.

== Career ==
From January 2016 Jones has been employed at the Sony UK Technology Centre, Pencoed, Wales, leading the development of advanced manufacturing technology with Japan for which she was recognised in The Telegraph Top 50 Women in Engineering under 35 list 2017. She also holds positions as Director, Engineering Education Scheme Wales and Patron, Alton Convent School, Hampshire, England. Jones is a Liveryman (by Servitude) of the Worshipful Company of Scientific Instrument Makers, the 84th Livery Company in the City of London.

In 2020, Jones left Sony to create iungo Solutions, a technology startup company aiming to help people affected by COVID-19 to upskill, retrain and secure re-employment. In 2020 she was appointed as a Royal Academy of Engineering Visiting Professor at the University of Wales Trinity Saint David. In February, 2021 she was awarded a place on the Royal Society's Entrepreneur in Residence Scheme. She serves on the board of directors of the Institute for Apprenticeships and Technical Education.

In May 2021, Jones was appointed Global Focal Point for Upskilling Migrants for Employment at the United Nations Major Group for Children and Youth. She is the youngest Welsh citizen under the age of 30 to receive this diplomatic honour.

=== Awards and honours ===
Jones was appointed Member of the Order of the British Empire (MBE) in the 2020 Birthday Honours for services to women in engineering in Wales. Other awards and honours include:

- 2011 – Wales Young Engineer of the Year
- 2012 – Research Councils UK Experience Prize
- 2012 – UK Young Engineer of the Year
- 2012 – Duke of York's Award for Creative Use of Technology
- 2012 – Wales Young Achiever Award
- 2012 – Leonard Landon Goodman Award for Excellence in Engineering
- 2012 – The Institution of Engineering and Technology Intel Inspiration Award for Entrepreneurship
- 2016 – American Express everywoman in Technology Rising Star 2016
- 2016 – Freeman of the Worshipful Company of Scientific Instrument Makers
- 2016 – Top 35 Under 35 Professional Business Women in Wales 2016 – youngest on the list
- 2017 – St David Awards Finalist in Science, Technology & Innovation Category 2017 – Jones lost out to Meena Upadhyaya but was described as a "potential winner of the award in the future"
- 2017 – Freedom of the City of London (2017)
- 2017 – The Daily Telegraph Top 50 Women in Engineering under 35 2017
- 2017 – Liveryman of the Worshipful Company of Scientific Instrument Makers
- 2017 – Top 35 Under 35 Professional Business Women in Wales 2017
- 2017 – The Manufacturer Top 100 EXEMPLAR Figure (top 20)
- 2017 – Aviva Woman of the Future for Technology & Digital
- 2017 – WeAreTheCity TechWomen50 Award
- 2018 – Forbes 30 under 30 Europe Industry List
- 2018 – Forbes 30 under 30 Europe Youngest List
- 2018 – Management Today 35 under 35 One to Watch
- 2020 – Listed in Who's Who
- 2020 – ChwaraeTeg Womenspire Board Member of the Year
- 2020 – WeAreTheCity TechWomen100 Award
- 2020 – WalesOnline 35 Under 35: The top young business and professional women in Wales 2020
