= Sawnder Sion =

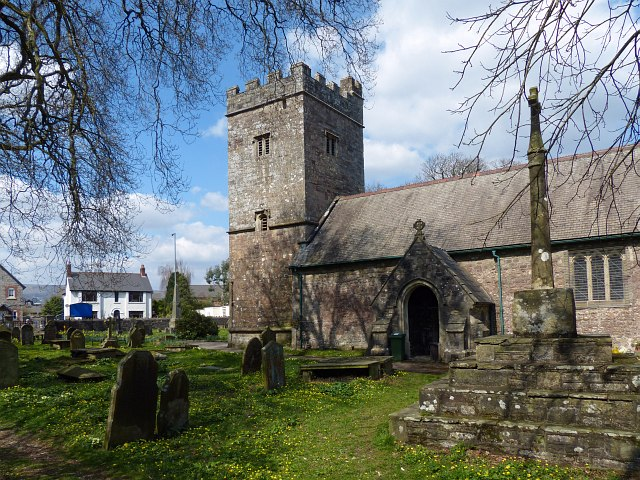
St Michael's Church, Llantarnam

Sawnder Sion was a Welsh poet of the 16th century. He was known as the "Lion of Llantarnam" and was affiliated with Llantarnam Abbey, although he lived in Llangovan, near Raglan.

He is buried beneath the choir in St Michael's Church, Llantarnam. His funeral was attended by fellow poet and friend Dafydd Benwyn, whose poem praised him:

"In the choir of St Michael
Is a bed. I shall weep
There is poetry there
And great learning and choice knowledge.
And there went the lion of the monastery
Of Deuma yesterday to our regret."
