= St David Lewis and St Francis Xavier Church, Usk =

St David Lewis and St Francis Xavier Church
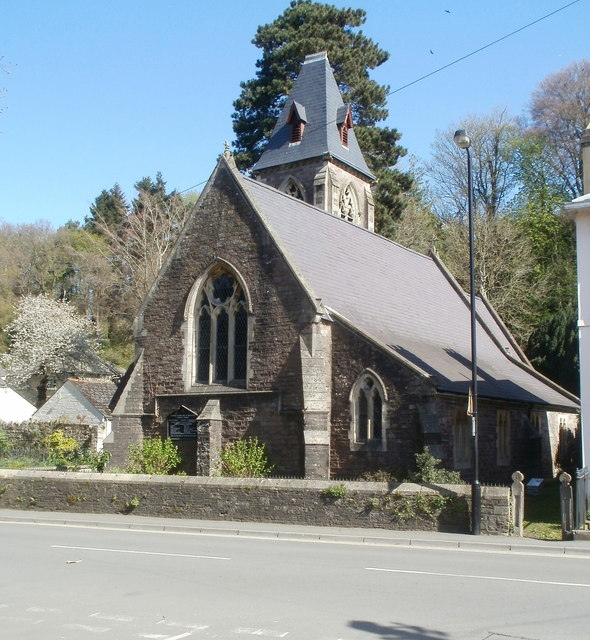
- St David Lewis and St Francis Xavier Church
- 51.7044°N 2.9044°W
- Location: Usk
- Country: Wales
- Denomination: Roman Catholic
- Website: CatholicParishofUsk.org.uk

History
- Status: Parish church
- Dedication: Francis Xavier, David Lewis

Architecture
- Functional status: Active
- Heritage designation: Grade II listed
- Designated: 30 April 2004
- Architect: Charles Hansom
- Completed: 14 October 1847

Administration
- Province: Cardiff-Menevia
- Archdiocese: Cardiff-Menevia
- Deanery: North Gwent
- Parish: St David Lewis & St Francis Xavier

St David Lewis and St Francis Xavier Church is a Roman Catholic parish church in Usk, Monmouthshire, Wales. It was built in 1847 and designed by Charles Hansom in the Gothic Revival style. The church is dedicated to two Jesuit saints, Francis Xavier and the local David Lewis, who is buried nearby. It is located on Porthycarne Street near the town centre. In 2019, a shrine in the church was dedicated to David Lewis. The church is a Grade II listed building.

== History ==
=== Foundation ===
After the Reformation, Monmouthshire continued to have a local Catholic community. In 1616, David Lewis was born in Abergavenny, he became a Jesuit, and after his training he returned to work in Monmouthshire for thirty years. He headed the Jesuit college at Cwm, Llanrothal. In 1678, after praying at the Gunter Mansion he was arrested at St Michael's Church, Llantarnam, after being implicated in the fictitious Popish Plot, was executed in 1679, and buried in the graveyard of the Priory Church of St Mary, Usk.

In the 1700s, Catholic Mass was celebrated in the home of the Davis family, Llancayo House, in Usk. In 1799, Fr Joseph Hunt was appointed by William Sharrock the Vicar Apostolic of the Western District to serve the Usk mission. In 1803, he was succeeded by Fr Charles Haly. Until 1847, Mass was celebrated in a chapel in Porthycarne Street. After the construction of the present church, the old chapel became a school and later the parish hall.

=== Construction ===
In 1847, the present church was built. Francis McDonnell, a local solicitor, donated the land and paid for half of the construction costs. The architect was Charles Hansom. On 14 October 1847, the church was opened by the Vicar Apostolic of the Welsh District Joseph Brown. In the 1850s and 1860s windows, made by Hardman & Co., were installed in the church. In 1865, the tower, also designed by Hansom, was added. In 1970, David Lewis was made a saint by Pope Paul VI. On 18 November 2019, a shrine in the church was dedicated to St David Lewis by the Archbishop of Cardiff George Stack.

== Gallery ==
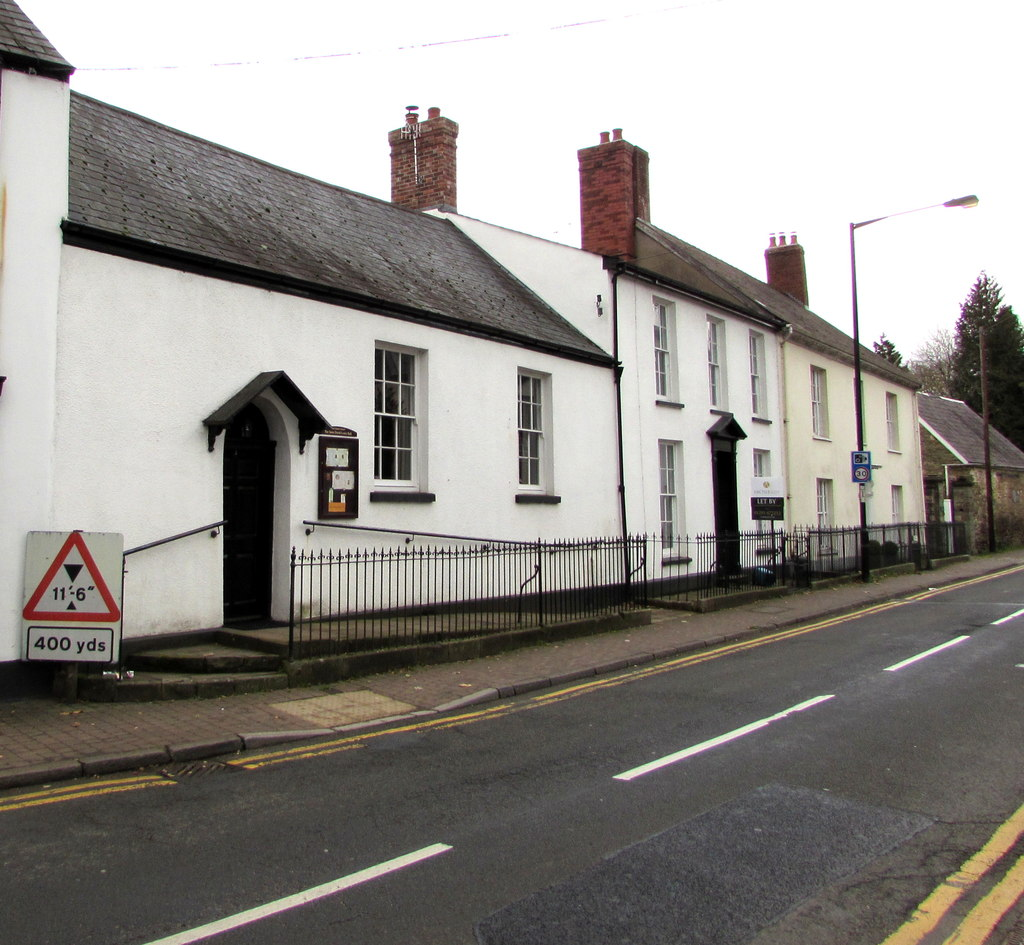
Parish hall

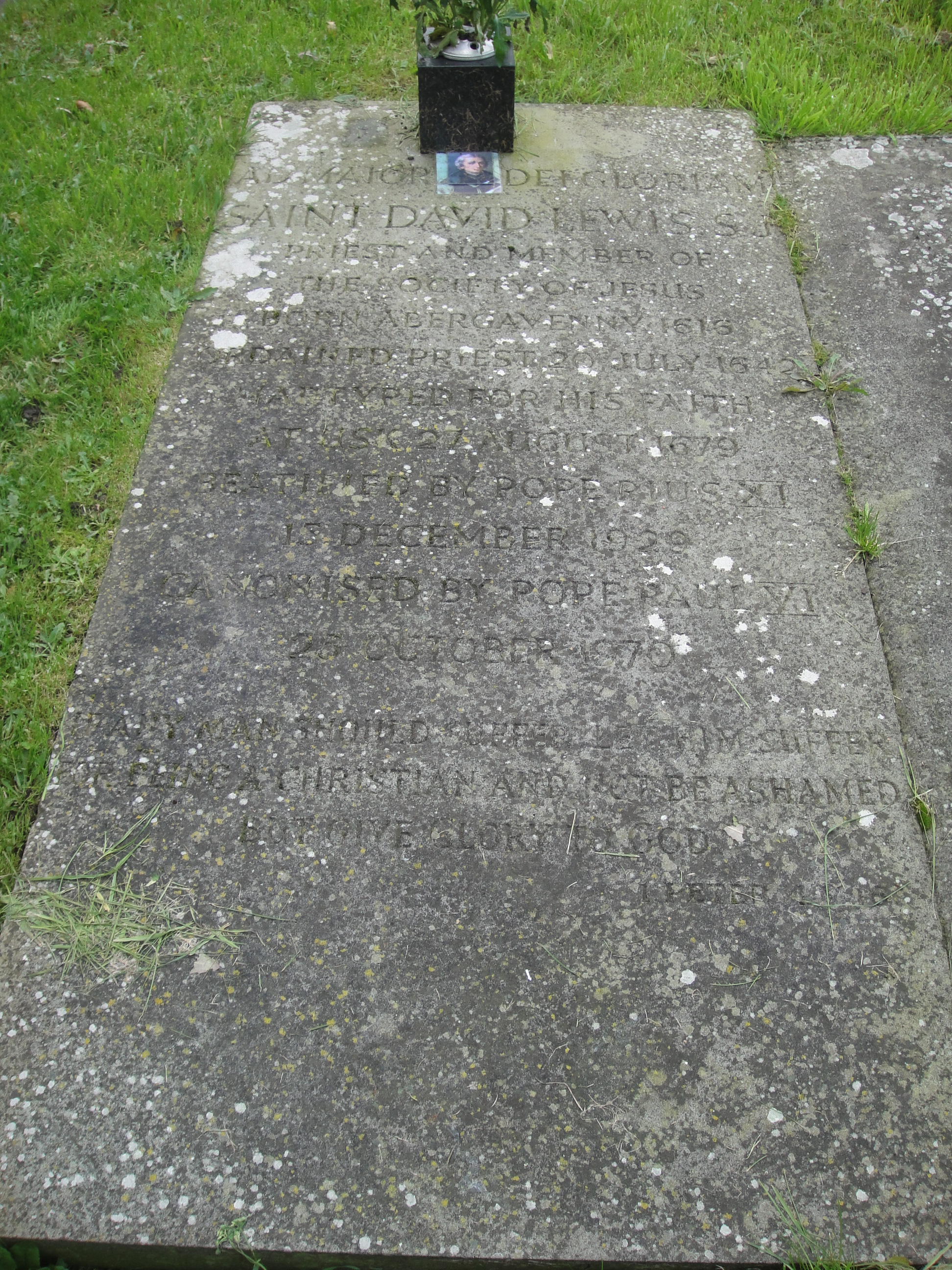
Grave of St David Lewis

== See also ==
- Archdiocese of Cardiff-Menevia
