= Splott =

Area of Cardiff, Wales

Coordinates: 51.48357°N 3.15349°W

- Community
- Population: 13,261
- OS grid reference: ST200767
- Principal area: Cardiff
- Country: Wales
- Sovereign state: United Kingdom
- Post town: CARDIFF
- Postcode district: CF24
- Dialling code: 029
- Police: South Wales
- Fire: South Wales
- Ambulance: Welsh
- UK Parliament: Cardiff South & Penarth
- Senedd Cymru – Welsh Parliament: Cardiff South & Penarth
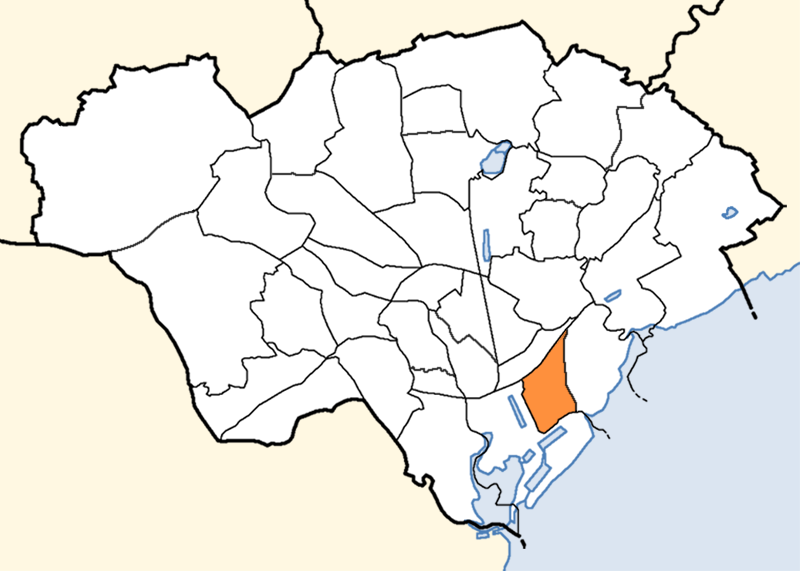
- List of places UK Wales Cardiff Map of the community

Splott (Welsh: Y Sblot) is a district and community in the south of the city of Cardiff, capital of Wales, just east of the city centre. It was built up in the late 19th century on the land of two farms of the same name: Upper Splott and Lower Splott Farms. Splott is characterised by its once vast steelworks and rows of tightly knit terraced houses. The suburb of Splott falls into the Splott electoral ward.

Fanciful suggestions for the origin of the name have included a truncation of God's Plot, as the land belonged to the Bishop of Llandaff in medieval times, and a derivation of plat, meaning a grassy area of land. The name of the original farm would seem to be Middle English splott, from Old English ('speck, blot, patch of land') and the word is to be found in other English place names in the Vale of Glamorgan, Gower, and Pembrokeshire, as well as in Somerset and Devon, in the West Country of England, from where it was presumably introduced by English settlers. It has frequently been noted on lists of unusual place names.

The population of Splott in the United Kingdom Census 2001 was 12,074, in 5,101 households, of which only 183 are detached homes. Of the 8,221 adults in the area, only 1,000 have the lowest category of qualifications (Level 1 or below). In 2011 the population had increased to 13,261.

== History ==
Splott is a traditional part of the City of Cardiff. Most of the housing stock is Victorian in origin built during the expansion of the city's iron and steel industry to house workers in these factories.

The early history of Splott is given in the Cardiff Records. This says that "Splott was anciently held by the Bawdrips of Penmark. It consisted mainly of two farms, called the Upper and Lower Splott, situated between Roath Village and the sea."

- 1440 – the Splott is mentioned as bounding certain lands of Isabel le Despenser, Countess of Worcester and Warwick.
- 1596 – William Bawdrip of Penmark built a fair house at the Splott and made it his chief residence.
- 1626 – William Bawdrip of Splott was Member of Parliament for Cardiff. He sold Penmark and Splott to Sir Edward Lewis of the Van.
- 1638 – Sir Edward Lewis of the Van died.
- 1740 – the Llandaff Survey of this year mentions a chief rent of four shillings as payable in respect of Splott Farm in Roath.

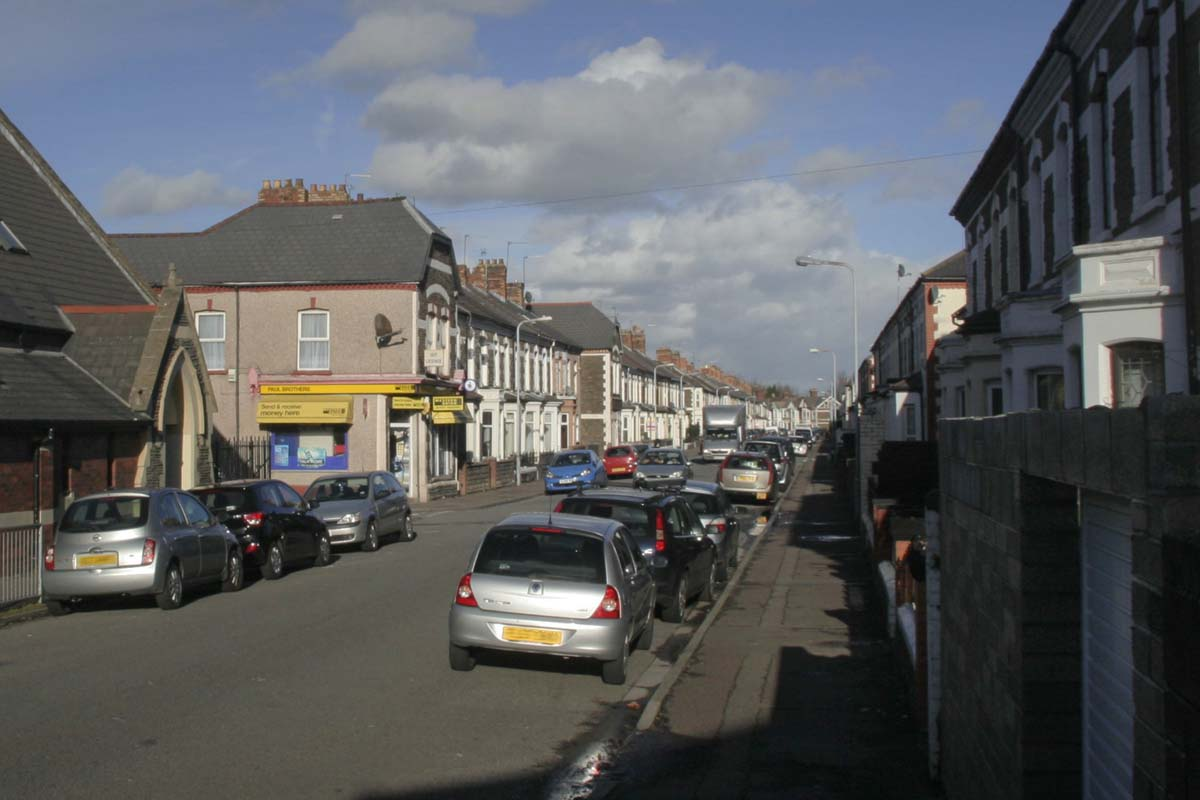
Habershon Street, named after William Habershon

No residential or industrial development took place in the area, however, until the end of the 19th century. In 1880 the whole area between Cardiff and the Bristol Channel (known as East Moors) was marshland, apart from the farms of Pengam and Splott. Residential development started in the 1880s, constructing streets, houses, shops, taverns and Board Schools; subsequently, Churches were built by various denominations. The streets and housing were laid out by Habershon & Fawckner, architects for the Tredegar Estate. Splott park opened in 1901.

Inevitably there have been many changes in the years since Splott was first developed. Portmanmoor Road is now an industrial estate and its former Victorian era housing was demolished along with adjoining Enid Street, Layard Street, and Menelaus Street which no longer exist.

There is a strong community focus and this is centred on churches, schools, pubs and sporting teams. Roman Catholics remain well catered for through St. Albans and the associated school. This continues to produce rugby teams of all age groups which compete in city leagues. Splott University Settlement was one of the most successful British baseball teams, winning the Welsh League title several times.

Bridgend Street was one of the 17 streets demolished in the early 1970s, but to this day is recalled in the name of Bridgend Street Football Club, which plays in the Welsh Football League. The nickname of Bridgend Street is "The Mission" and motto is "Deeds Not Words". Their home base is The Fleurs Social Club on Portmanmoor Road.

In 2016 the Tremorfa district, which had previously been included as part of Splott, became a local government community in its own right. There is no community council for the Splott or Tremorfa areas.

In July 2017 the derelict citadel church collapsed with debris falling on the nearby rail line. One man died.

== The Welsh language ==
The earliest known example of Welsh-language literature from Splott is a poem by the Elizabethan poet Dafydd Benwyn on the death of William Bawdrip of Splott. It includes the couplet:

Du yw'r Ysblot dros y blaid,
Diweniaith, da i weiniaid

Translation:

Splott is black for his people,
Without flattery, (he was) good to the weak

With the growth of Splott as a suburb of Cardiff, English was established as the main language.

The number of Welsh speakers in the area increased when East Moors Steelworks was opened in 1891 with large numbers of workers from the parent plant at Dowlais near Merthyr Tydfil. To meet the religious needs of these Welsh-speaking workers, Welsh-language chapels were opened in the area, including Ainon, Walker Road (1894, Welsh Baptists); Bethlehem, Eyre Street (1895, Welsh Independents); and Jerusalem, Manon Street/Walker Road (1892, Calvinistic Methodists).

According to the 2011 UK Census the number of Splott residents over three years old who could speak Welsh was 1,077 (8.6%).

Splott has one Welsh-medium primary school, Ysgol Glan Morfa.

== People ==
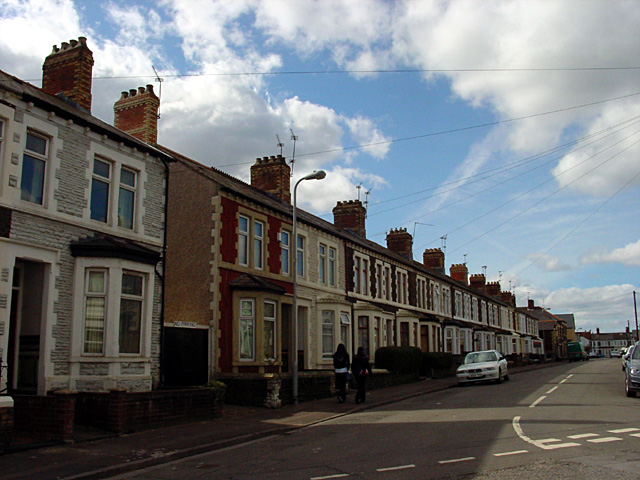
Wilson Street, Splott

- John Humphrys (radio and TV presenter) was born in Splott.
- Dame Shirley Bassey (singer) originated from nearby Tiger Bay, but moved to Splott at the age of two and attended Moorland Primary School and Splott Secondary Modern School.
- Clive Sullivan (Welsh rugby league player) grew up in Splott.
- Helen Raynor, writer of the Torchwood episode "Ghost Machine", which is also largely set there, lives in Splott.
- Lynn Bowles, the morning traffic reporter on BBC Radio 2, was born in Splott.
- The late Bob Humphrys, BBC Cymru/Wales sports journalist, and brother of John Humphrys (above), was also born in Splott.

== Popular culture ==
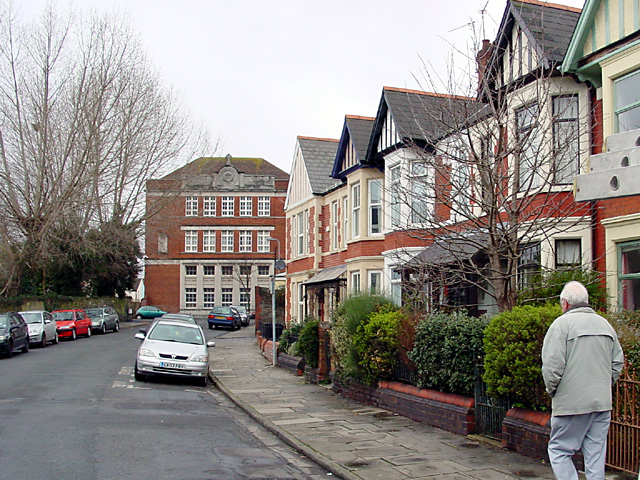
Farmville Road, Splott

Splott is featured in the third episode ("Ghost Machine") of the BBC science fiction drama and Doctor Who spin-off Torchwood, which is set in Cardiff. It is also mentioned somewhat humorously in other episodes, due to its English pronunciation, which was referred to as "SP-LO-T" but was corrected as "SP-LO". Splott also features in the Torchwood novel Another Life.

Splott and the neighbouring district of Tremorfa are the settings for several works by Welsh playwright Peter Gill.

Because the morning BBC Radio 2 traffic reports are read by the Splott-born Lynn Bowles, many listener contributions to the Terry Wogan and Ken Bruce shows feature (primarily fictitious) anecdotes humorously referring to the district. Lynn was affectionately known as "The Totty from Splotty". On 14 December 2009, Wogan was made Lord of Splott live on his radio programme in its final week, by resident and broadcaster Noreen Bray. She invested him on behalf of TAFFS, or Terry's Adoring Fans From Splott.

Splott is the setting of “Iphigenia in Splott”, a modern-day reworking of the classic Greek drama, by Welsh playwright Gary Owen. It premiered at Cardiff's Sherman Theatre in 2015, before transferring to the National Theatre in London and the 59E59 Theaters in New York in 2016.

== Governance ==
Splott is also an electoral ward and parish of Cardiff, Wales. The electoral ward includes the areas of Pengam Green, Splott and Tremorfa. The ward is bounded by Adamsdown and Penylan to the northwest; Rumney and Trowbridge to the north east; the Severn estuary to the south east and Butetown to the south west. It is a multi-member ward, with three councillors. The ward has generally returned Labour party candidates, including Jack Brooks, who served two terms as Leader of South Glamorgan County Council. Gordon Houlston was a Splott Labour Councillor for over 30 years and was Chairman of South Glamorgan County Council, and Deputy Lord Mayor and Lord Mayor of the City of Cardiff. He was made a Papal Knight (KSG) by Pope John Paul 2 for services to the Catholic Church.

Since May 2017, the ward has been represented by Welsh Labour Councillors Jane Henshaw, Ed Stubbs, and Huw Thomas. Huw Thomas is also the current Leader of Cardiff Council.

In the UK Parliament, Splott is part of the constituency of Cardiff South and Penarth. Its most prominent MP was former Labour Prime Minister James Callaghan. The current MP is Labour's Stephen Doughty, first elected in 2012.

In the Welsh Senedd, Splott is part of the constituency of Cardiff South and Penarth, whose current MS is Labour's Vaughan Gething, first elected in 2011.

== Splott Green Hub ==
In October 2018, two Splott residents Rebecca Clark and Hannah Garcia, launched a public campaign to stop the local council from selling land near Railway Street in Splott for development. A petition protesting against the decision gathered more than 2,500 signatures within five days.

Green City, also known as Green Squirrel, are a community-led environmental group that want to transform the unused site into a new eco-friendly social hub for Splott and Adamsdown. The campaign successfully stopped the sale and the council have now leased the land to the group for community benefit.

According to the 2014 Welsh Index of Multiple Deprivation, Splott and Adamsdown are among the most deprived areas of Wales, and both wards have an open space deficit compared to the standard recreational open space requirement for Cardiff. It is hoped that the Railway Street site can be used to help improve the local community and support other green projects in the area.

According to the project website, plans could include a sustainable community hub building for workshops and events as well as affordable shipping containers for small businesses. Food growing and composting areas, bee hives and other wildlife habitats could also be created on the land to support local biodiversity and outdoor play and learning.

== Cardiff districts ==
Splott is part of the STAR area of Cardiff (STAR stands for Splott, Tremorfa, Adamsdown and Roath, four inner city suburbs born out of the industrial revolution). The former STAR Centre leisure facility is located in Splott (although this was closed when the new STAR Hub was opened and the former STAR Centre was then utilized by the NHS). Splott Pool was also closed and demolished to make way for the new STAR Hub, that opened in September 2016.

The area is served by Splott Library (within the new hub) and Roath Library. The latter was re-located to the Cardiff Royal Infirmary after the previous branch library building on Newport Road was closed due to prohibitive renovation costs. In January 2017, plans were announced for a new permanent library and cafe in the former hospital chapel. In 2018, a deal was made for the previous library building to be taken over by a local dance organization.

Riverside	City centre	Adamsdown
Grangetown	Butetown	Splott
	Cardiff Bay	Tremorfa

== See also ==
- For details of Splott Aerodrome, see RAF Pengam Moors
