= Ryan Harford =

Welsh rugby player (born 1982)

- Born: Ryan Harford; 24 September 1982 (age 44) Tremorfa, Cardiff, Wales
- Height: 183 cm (6 ft 0 in)
- School: Willows high school

Rugby union career
- Position: Tight head prop
Youth career
- St Albans
Senior career
Years	Team	Apps	(Points)
2011-	Cardiff	37	(5)

Ryan Harford (born 24 September 1982) Hailing from the Tremorfa district of Cardiff, Ryan James Harford played for the city's St Albans club at junior and youth level, coached by former Welsh International Mark Ring.

Having attended Willows High School, Ryan joined the Pontypridd Academy in 2002, and made a big impression as an effective tight head scrummager who was also able to contribute in the loose, notching up a tally of eight tries in the season for the under 21 team.

Promoted to the Pontypridd senior squad for the 2003–2004 campaign, Ryan became a regular choice at tight head during the club's successful Premiership campaign, his potential as a modern ball carrying forward underlined by selection to tour South Africa with the Young Warriors development squad in the summer of 2004.

In the summer of 2011, Ryan's stature as a seasoned campaigner at Premiership level was enhanced by a call up to Cardiff Blues senior squad, covering the period of the World Cup tournament. He remains with Cardiff and has played for the Cardiff RFC team during the 2012–2013 season
