= Gunter Mansion =

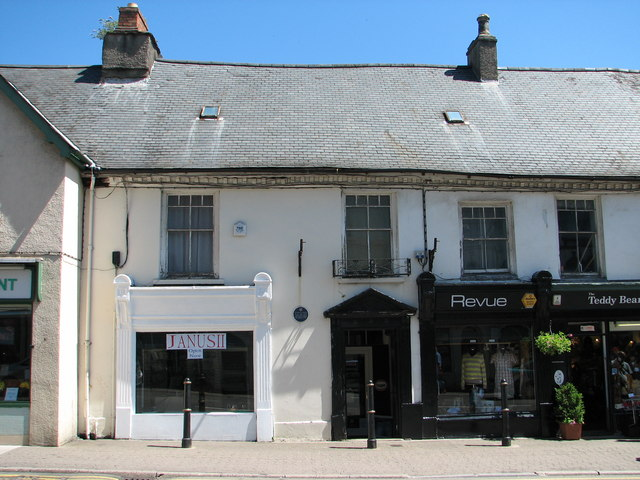

- Location within Monmouthshire
- 51.8204°N 3.0162°W
- Type: House
- Location: Abergavenny, Monmouthshire

History
- Built: Late medieval

Site notes
- Governing body: Welsh Georgian Trust

Listed Building – Grade II*
- Official name: No.s 37–40 (consec) Cross Street, Abergavenny, Gwent
- Designated: 7 May 1952
- Reference no.: 2404

Gunter Mansion, 37–39 Cross Street, Abergavenny, Monmouthshire, Wales, is a house of the early 17th century. It was built around 1600 and mentioned in 1678 in the House of Commons of the United Kingdom as a place of public Catholic worship. It was the final place of prayer for Saint David Lewis before his execution on 27 August 1679. It is a Grade II* listed building.

== History ==
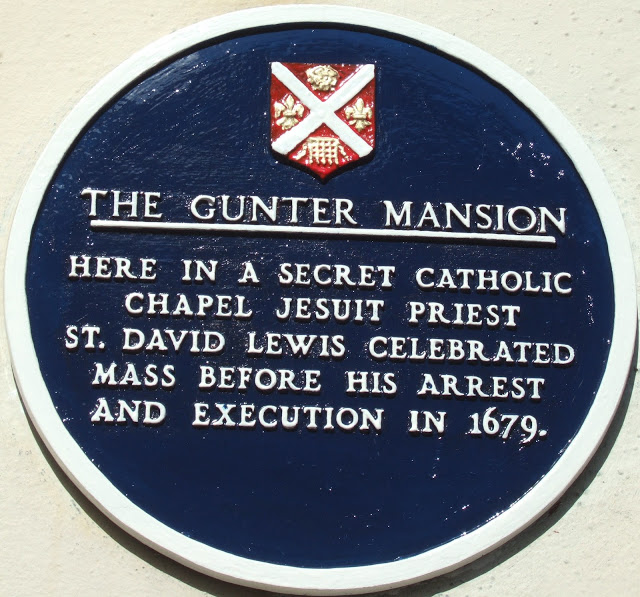
Plaque

After the Reformation and the Act of Supremacy 1558, in 1600, Thomas Gunter, a local Roman Catholic, built the house. A secret chapel was constructed in the attic.

On 12 April 1678, John Arnold (the MP for Monmouthshire), a fanatical anti-Catholic, told the House of Commons, ‘that he had seen a public chapel near the house of Mr Thomas Gunter, a papist convict, in Abergavenny, adorned with the mark of the Jesuits on the outside, and is informed that Mass is said there by Captain Evans, a reported Jesuit, and by the aforesaid David Lewis in that very great numbers resort to the said chapel and very often at Church time, and he hath credibly heard that hundreds have gone out of the said chapel when not forty have gone out of the said church, that the said chapel is situate in a public street of the said town, and doth front the street.'

The younger Thomas Gunter had been notably indiscreet about his harbouring of Catholic priests, although this was a felony under the Jesuits, etc. Act 1584. Taking advantage of the tolerant religious atmosphere following the Restoration of Charles II, he told the local vicar frankly that "he had kept a priest in Oliver Cromwell's time, and would keep one now". Like most Catholic landowners he failed to anticipate that the outbreak of the Popish Plot would force the King, despite his own pro-Catholic leanings, to insist on stricter enforcement of the Penal Laws. The laity were reminded that harbouring priests was a crime, which carried the death penalty, although neither Gunter nor any other Catholic layman was actually prosecuted for this offence.

In 1678, with the outbreak of the Popish Plot, a Jesuit priest, David Lewis was arrested at St Michael's Church, Llantarnam. He prayed in the Gunter Mansion chapel before being executed in Usk.

In 1864, the central area of the house was divided from the rest and became the Parrot Inn. In 1898, it became the Cardiff Arms. In 1907, two brothers, Thomas and Edwin Foster bought and repaired the building. They discovered evidence of the existence of the chapel in the attic. A mural showing the Adoration of the Magi was found and given to the Abergavenny Castle Museum along with the original door from the front entrance. Other than repairs to the chimney in 1913, and an extension to the rear of the house, the building has not been altered since 1907. In January 2017, the building was bought by the Welsh Georgian Trust.

== See also ==
- Philip Evans and John Lloyd
- St David Lewis and St Francis Xavier Church, Usk

== Sources ==
- Kenyon, John (2000). The Popish Plot. Phoenix Press. ISBN 978-1-842-12168-9. OCLC 912914648.
