= No. 614 Squadron RAuxAF =

No. 614 (County of Glamorgan) Squadron RAuxAF
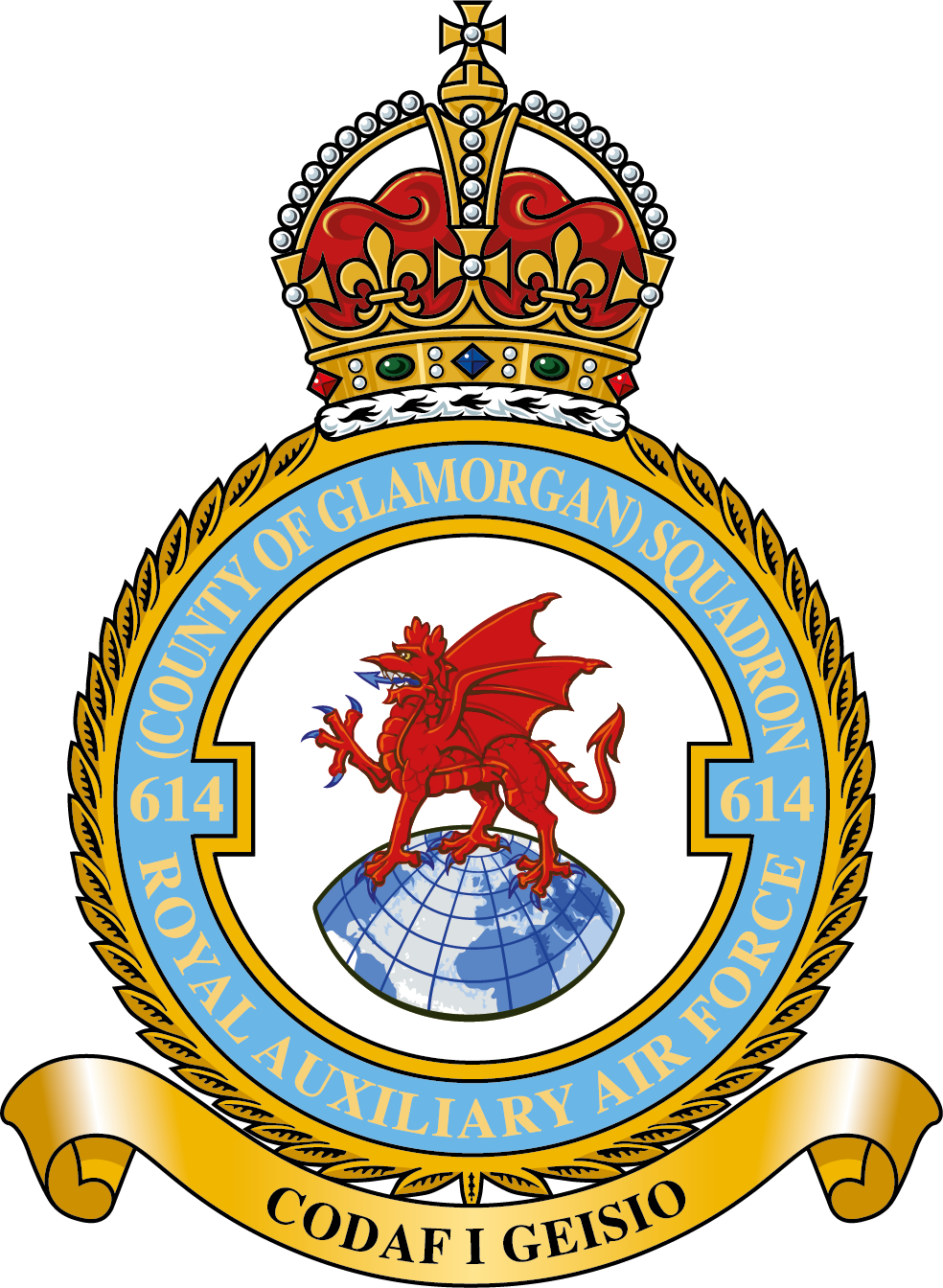
- No. 614 Squadron RAF
- Active: 1 Jun 1937 – 25 Jan 1944; 3 Mar 1944 – 27 Jul 1945; 10 May 1946 – 10 Mar 1957; 10 Mar 2014 - present
- Country: United Kingdom
- Branch: Royal Air Force
- Part of: Royal Auxiliary Air Force
- Garrison/HQ: Ty Llewellyn, Morgan Street, Cardiff CF10 4FG
- Nickname: County of Glamorgan
- Mottos: Welsh: Codaf I geisio (Translated: "I rise to search")
- post 1950 aircraft insignia

Commanders
- Honorary Air Commodore: R.E.C. Cadman

Insignia
- Squadron Badge heraldry: On a demi-terrestrial globe, a red dragon passant The red dragon points to the squadrons connection with Wales
- Squadron Codes: YX (Apr 1939 – 1940); LJ (1940 – Aug 1942); RAU (May 1946 – 1949); 7A (1949–1950)

No. 614 Squadron was originally formed on 1 June 1937 as an army co-operation squadron unit of the Auxiliary Air Force. It served during the Second World War first in this role and later as a bomber squadron. Upon reformation it served as a fighter squadron until the disbandment of the Royal Auxiliary Air Force on 10 March 1957.

== History ==
=== Formation and early years ===
Formed at RAF Pengam Moors near Cardiff (the often cited Llandow was not erected yet) as an army co-operation squadron unit and part of the Auxiliary Air Force on 1 June 1937, No. 614 squadron was initially equipped with Hawker Hinds. By the end of the year it had received some additional Hawker Hectors which it flew until November 1939, when the squadron became operational on Westland Lysanders, the first of which had arrived in July of that year.

=== In support of Bomber Command ===
In June 1940 No. 614 squadron moved to Scotland to carry out coastal patrols, covering an area from Inverness to Berwick, 'A' flight, which was detached to Inverness for that purpose, became No. 241 Squadron RAF in the process. From July 1941 it began re-equipping with Bristol Blenheims, a process completed by January 1942. In support of RAF Bomber Command's 'Thousand Bomber Raids' in May and June 1942, the squadron sent its Blenheims to attack enemy airfields in the Low Countries and in August 1942 it laid smoke screens for the landings at Dieppe.

=== In North Africa ===
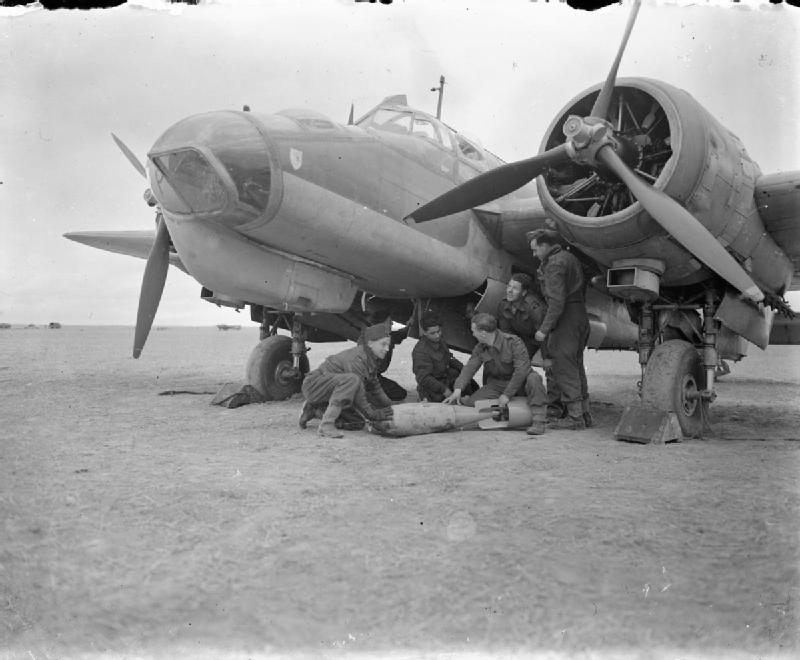
Armourers of No. 614 Squadron preparing to load a 250-lb GP bomb into a Bristol Blenheim, at Canrobert, Algeria

In November 1942 the Squadron moved to North Africa. There the Squadron carried out attacks against enemy airfields and lines of communication until May 1943, when the fighting in that area ended. It then became involved in shipping escort duties in the Mediterranean until being disbanded on 25 January 1944 at Borizzo Airfield, Sicily.

=== On Halifaxes and Liberators ===
The second incarnation of No. 614 Squadron had its origins in No. 462 Squadron, Royal Australian Air Force (RAAF), formed on 7 September 1942 at Fayid, Egypt, under Article XV of the British Commonwealth Air Training Plan. This squadron contained mostly British aircrew and ground staff. Consequently, RAAF Overseas Headquarters requested that the squadron be renumbered and transferred to the RAF. On 15 February 1944, while it was en route to Celone, Italy the unit was renumbered as No. 614 Squadron. Equipped with Handley Page Halifaxes it was now involved in bombing missions over Italy and the Balkans and it also carried out supply drops to partisans in those areas. The Squadron re-equipped with Consolidated Liberators in March 1945, the Halifaxes finally being withdrawn in March 1945, but on 27 July 1945 it was disbanded at Amendola Airfield, Italy when it was renumbered as No. 214 Squadron RAF.

=== Post war ===
With the reactivation of the Royal Auxiliary Air Force, No. 614 Squadron was reformed on 10 May 1946 (though one source claims 26 August 1947) at RAF Llandow as a day fighter squadron. Recruiting of personnel did not start until November 1946 though. Initially the squadron was equipped with Supermarine Spitfires and these gave way to de Havilland Vampires in July 1950 but, along with all the flying units of the RAuxAF, the unit was disbanded on 10 March 1957.

=== Present ===
No. 614 Sqn Royal Auxiliary Air Force was reformed in 2014 and is now a General Support Sqn (GSS) that provides dedicated support to RAF Brize Norton, Oxfordshire. It maintains a base in Cardiff and recruits from across South Wales and the West of England.

== Aircraft operated ==
Aircraft operated by No. 614 Squadron RAF, data from
From	To	Aircraft	Variant
June 1937	1939	Hawker Hind	
November 1937	February 1940	Hawker Hector	Mk.I
July 1939	July 1941	Westland Lysander	Mk.II
April 1941	January 1942	Westland Lysander	Mks.III, IIIa
July 1941	September 1942	Bristol Blenheim	Mk.IV
August 1942	January 1944	Bristol Blenheim	Mk.V
February 1944	March 1945	Handley Page Halifax	Mk.II
August 1944	July 1945	Consolidated Liberator	Mk.VIII
November 1946	November 1948	Supermarine Spitfire	LF.16e
July 1948	April 1951	Supermarine Spitfire	F.22
July 1950	July 1953	de Havilland Vampire	F.3
September 1951	March 1957	de Havilland Vampire	FB.5
December 1954	February 1956	de Havilland Vampire	FB.9

== Squadron bases ==
Bases and airfields used by No. 614 Squadron RAF, data from
From	To	Name
1 June 1937	2 October 1939	RAF Pengam Moors
2 October 1939	8 June 1940	RAF Odiham
8 June 1940	5 March 1941	RAF Grangemouth
5 March 1941	27 September 1941	RAF Macmerry
27 September 1941	3 October 1941	RAF Odiham
3 October 1941	25 August 1942	RAF Macmerry
26 August 1942	16 November 1942	RAF Odiham
16 November 1942	17 November 1942	RAF Portreath
17 November 1942	5 December 1942	Blida, Algeria
5 December 1942	7 February 1943	Canrobert, Algeria
7 February 1943	22 May 1943	Oulmene, Algeria
22 May 1943	28 August 1943	Tafaraoui, Algeria
28 August 1943	25 January 1944	Borizzo, Sicily
28 February 1944	10 May 1944	Celone, Italy
10 May 1944	15 July 1944	Stornara, Italy
15 July 1944	27 July 1945	Amendola, Italy
10 May 1946	10 March 1957	RAF Llandow

== Commanding officers ==
Officers commanding No. 614 Squadron RAF, data from
From	To	Name
June 1937	September 1939	S/Ldr. R.E.C. Cadman
September 1939	November 1939	F/Lt. L.J. Stickley
November 1939	January 1940	S/Ldr. W.R. Wills-Sandford
January 1940	June 1940	S/Ldr. A.A.N. Malan
June 1940	February 1941	W/Cdr. D.J. Eayrs
February 1941	August 1941	W/Cdr. H.M. Mulliken
August 1941	June 1942	W/Cdr. R.E.S. Skelton
June 1942	August 1943	W/Cdr. H.T. Sutton
August 1943	February 1944	W/Cdr. C.K. Bonner
February 1944		W/Cdr. W.T. Russell
		W/Cdr. J.S. Laird
	July 1945	W/Cdr. E.B.R. Lockwood
May 1946	July 1950	S/Ldr. W.H. Irving
July 1950	1954	S/Ldr. E.H. McHardy, DSO, DFC & Bar, CdG
1954	March 1957	S.Ldr. H.J.E. Howe
March 2014	July 2021	W/Cdr. P.J. Sagar MBE
July 2021		W/Cdr. O.H. Walker
