= St Govan's Church, Llangovan =

Coordinates: 51.7454°N 2.7882°W

Church of St Govan, Llangovan
- Church of St Govan
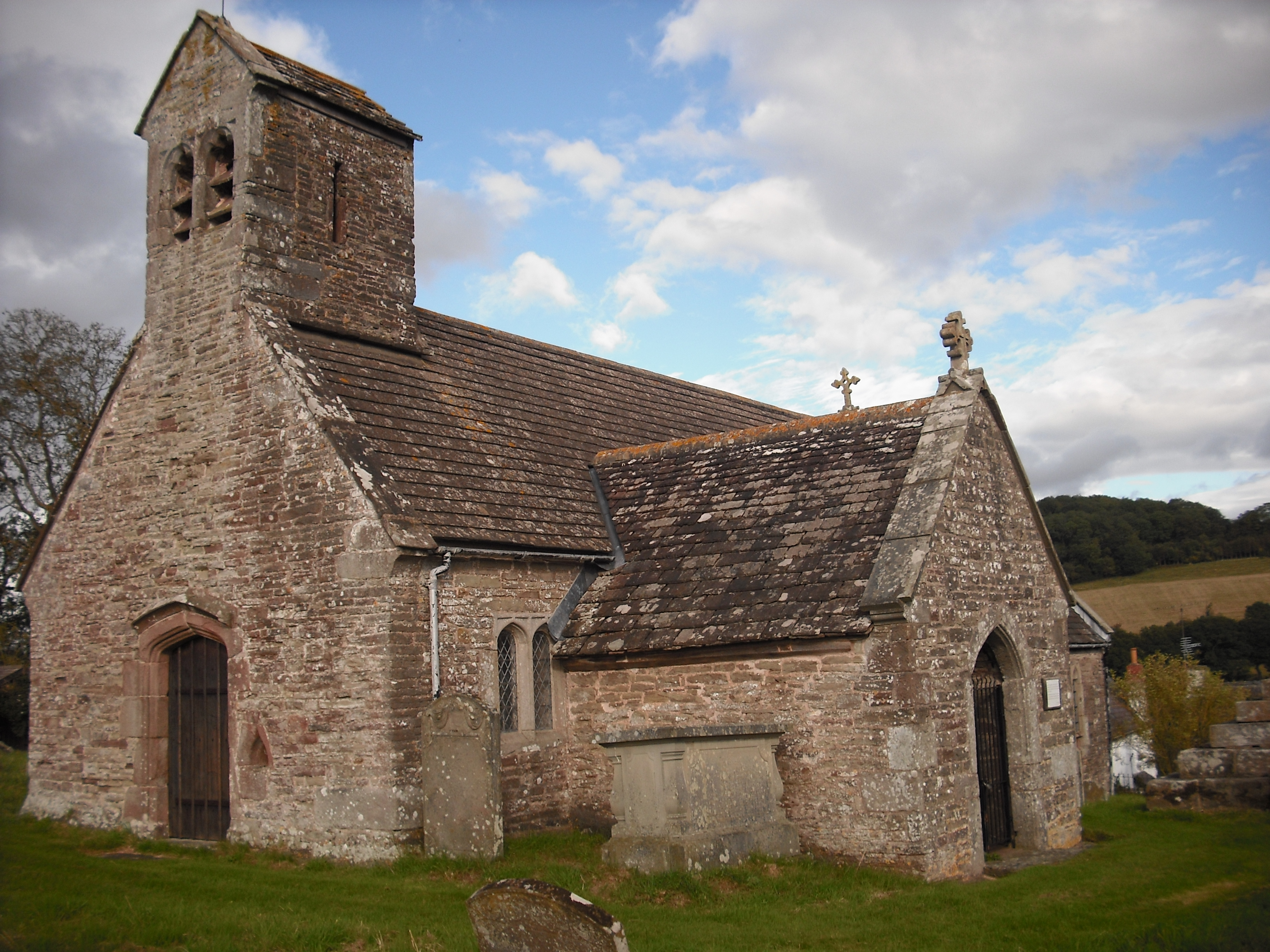
- "home to a colony of bats"

- Location in Monmouthshire
- Location: Llangovan, Monmouthshire
- Country: Wales

History
- Status: parish church
- Founded: 14th – 15th century

Architecture
- Functional status: Redundant
- Heritage designation: Grade II*
- Designated: 27 November 1953
- Architectural type: Church

The Church of St Govan in Llangovan, Monmouthshire, Wales, is a church with late-medieval origins. Renovations took place in the late 19th century. It is a Grade II* listed building and, since being declared redundant in the late 20th century, has been managed by the Vincent Wildlife Trust as a bat colony.

== History ==
The church is of Norman origin but the existing structure dates from the 14th/15th centuries. Further building works took place in the 17th century. A Victorian restoration was undertaken in 1888–1890 by A. W. Probyn and J. P. Moore of Gloucester. The church was declared redundant in the late 20th century and, since 1999, has been leased to the Vincent Wildlife Trust which manages the church as a bat roosting site. Occasional public access is permitted when this would not disturb the bat colony.

== Architecture and description ==
The architectural historian John Newman describes the building as "late medieval" but with evidence of its earlier origins. The church is small, comprising a nave, a chancel and a porch together with a "gabled double bellcote".
