= North Gwent Deanery =

The North Gwent Deanery, a Roman Catholic deanery in the Archdiocese of Cardiff-Menevia, previously in the Archdiocese of Cardiff in Wales, covers several churches in North Gwent and the surrounding area. In the early 2000s, the Head of the Valleys deanery was split. The churches in its western part, in the county boroughs of Merthyr Tydfi and Rhondda Cynon Taf, became part of the Pontypridd Deanery and the churches in its eastern part, in the county borough of Blaenau Gwent, became part of the North Gwent Deanery.

The dean is centred at Our Lady of Peace Parish in Newbridge, Caerphilly.

== Churches ==
- Our Lady and St Michael, Abergavenny - served from Belmont Abbey
- St Mary and St Michael, Llanarth - served from Abergavenny
- St Mary, Abertillery
- St Mary, Brynmawr - served from Abertillery
- Our Lady of the Angels, Cwmbran
- St David, Cwmbran - served from Our Lady of the Angels
- St Mary, Monmouth
- St Francis of Rome, Ross-on-Wye - served from Monmouth
- Our Lady of Peace, Newbridge
- The Sacred Heart, Pontllanfraith - served from Newbridge
- St Anthony of Padua and St Clare, Risca - served from Newbridge
- St Alban, Pontypool
- The Sacred Heart and St Felix, Blaenavon - served from Pontypool
- The Immaculate Conception, Tredegar
- All Saints, Ebbw Vale - served from Tredegar
- St John, Rhymney - served from Tredegar
- St David Lewis and St Francis Xavier Church, Usk

== Gallery ==
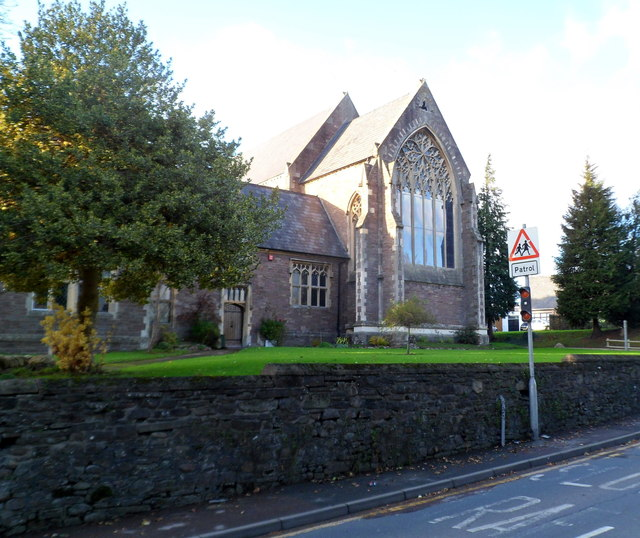
Our Lady and St Michael, Abergavenny

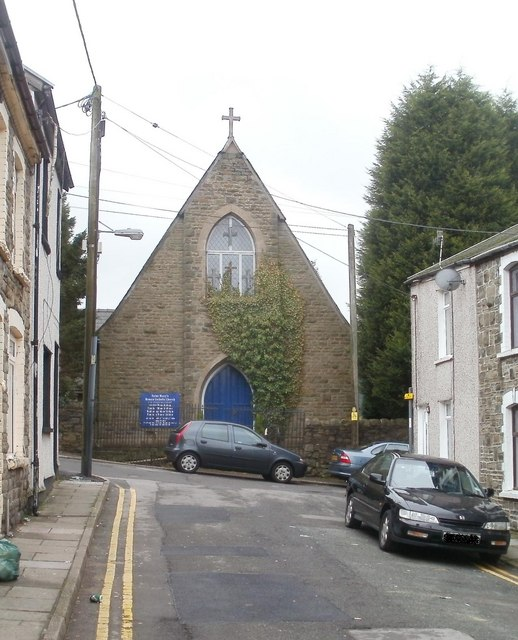
St Mary, Abertillery

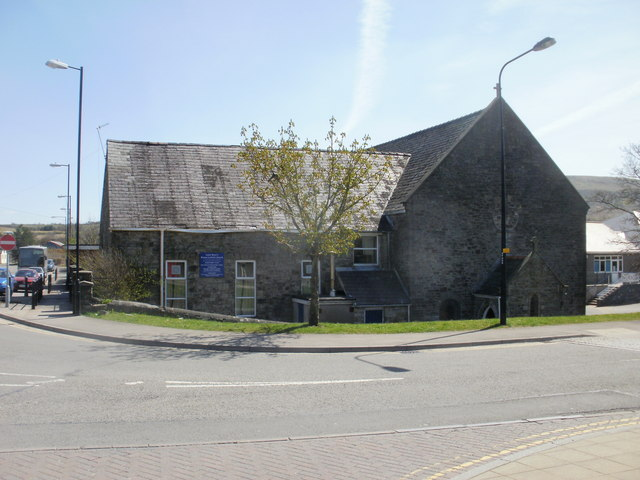
St Mary Brynmawr

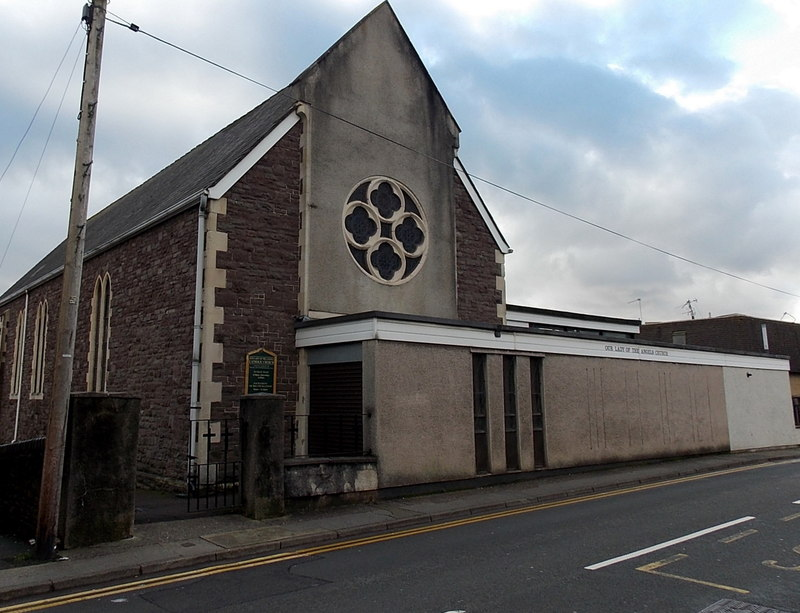
Our Lady of the Angels, Cwmbran

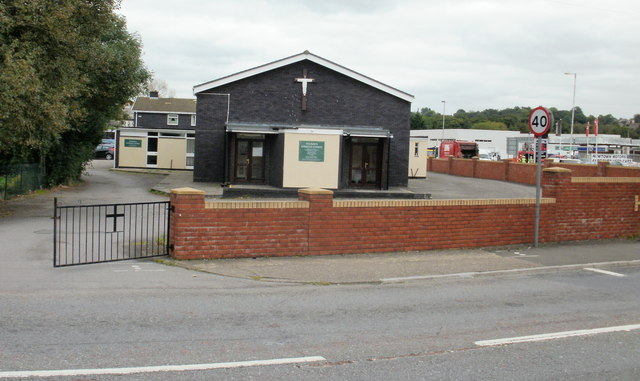
St David, Cwnbran

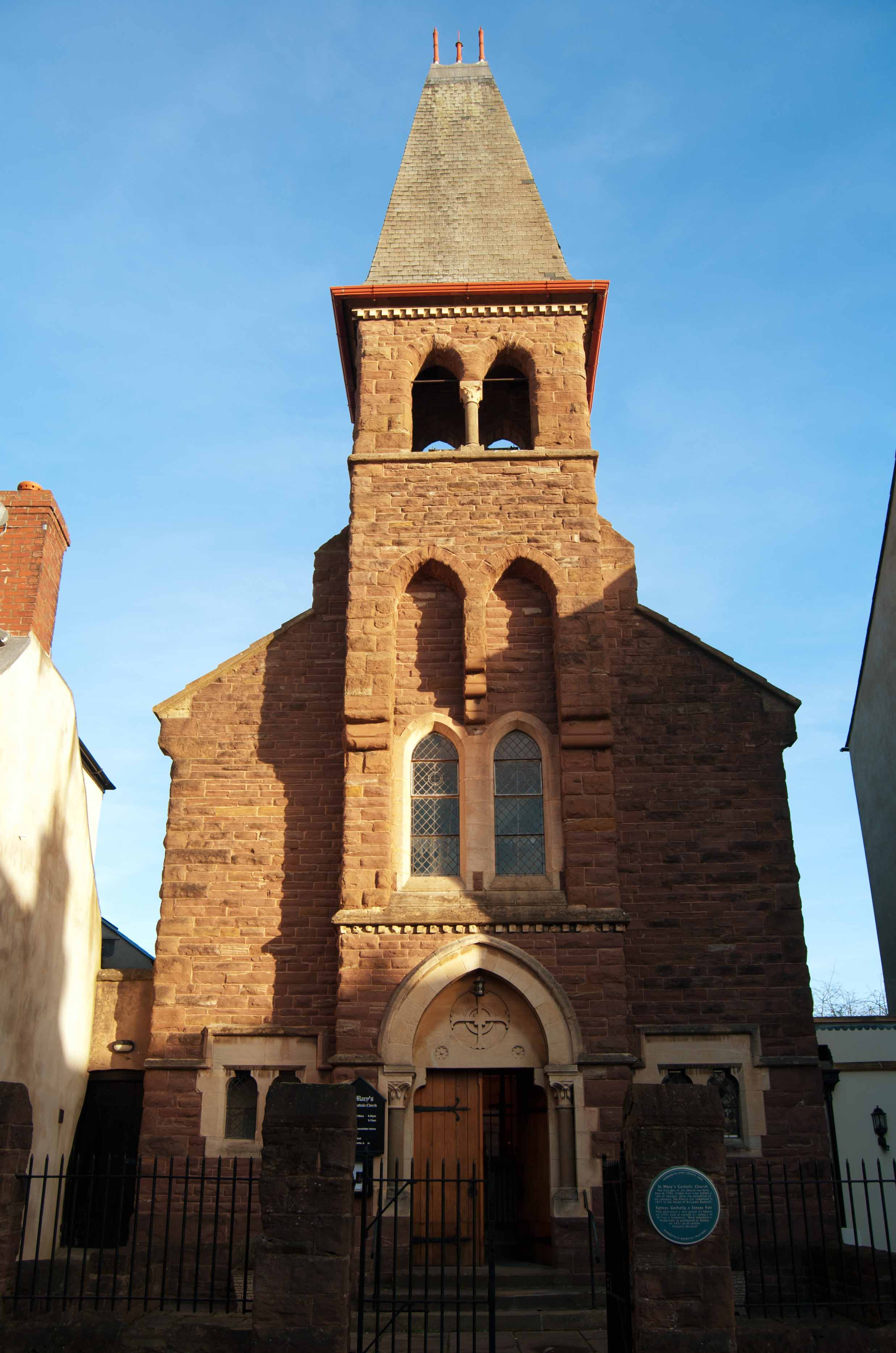
St Mary, Monmouth

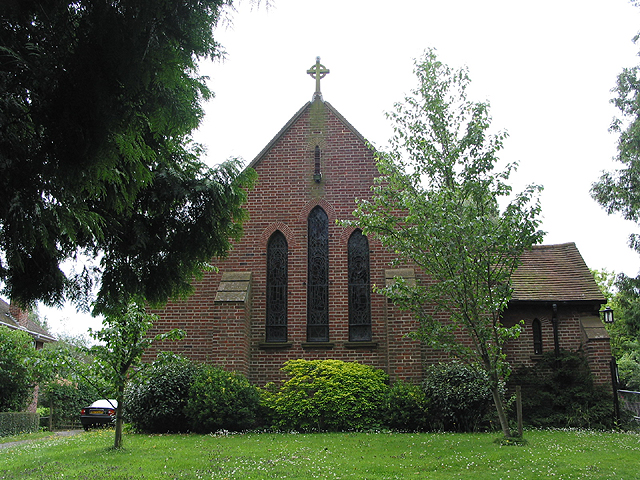
St Francis of Rome, Ross-on-Wye

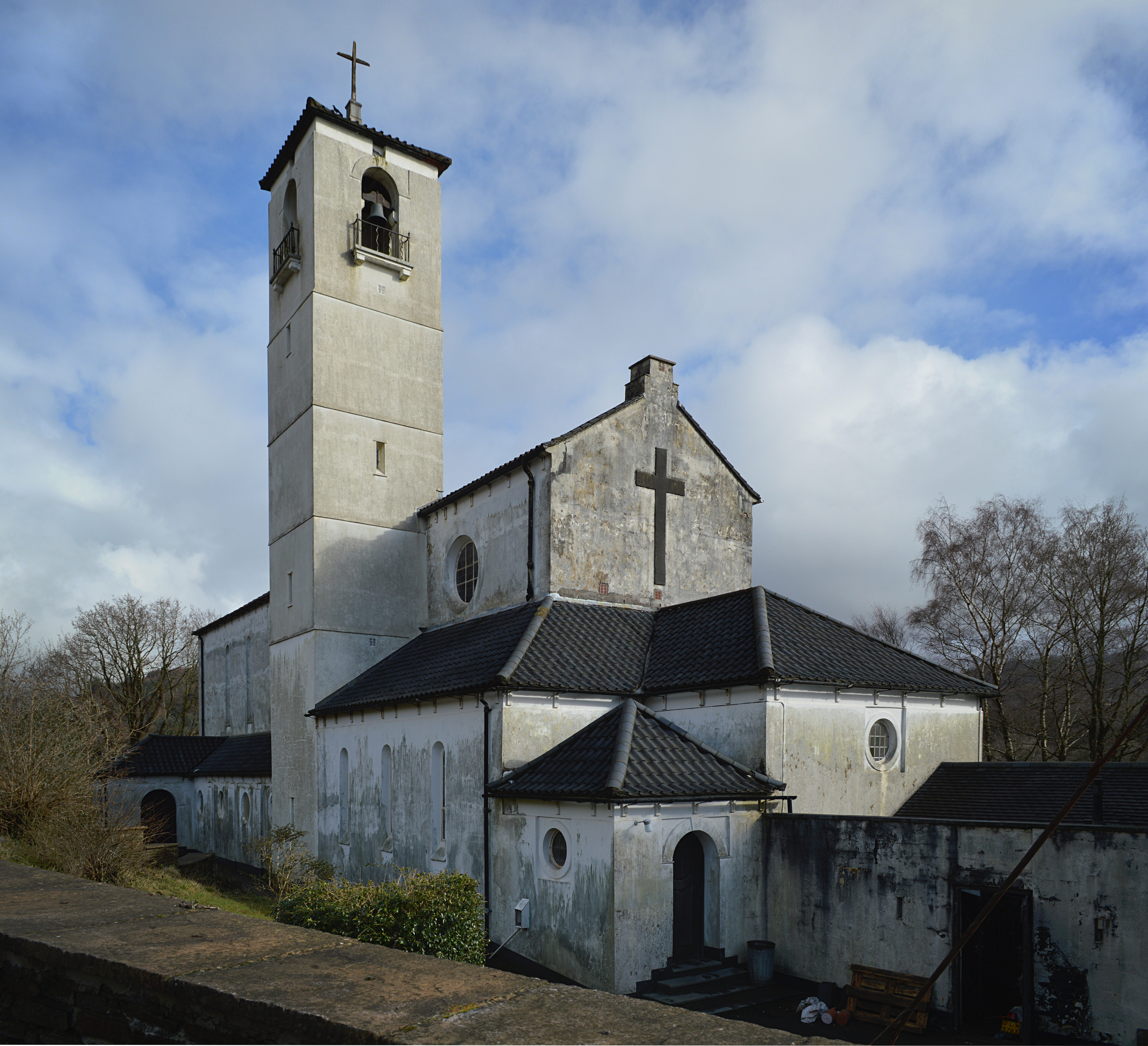
Our Lady of Peace, Newbridge

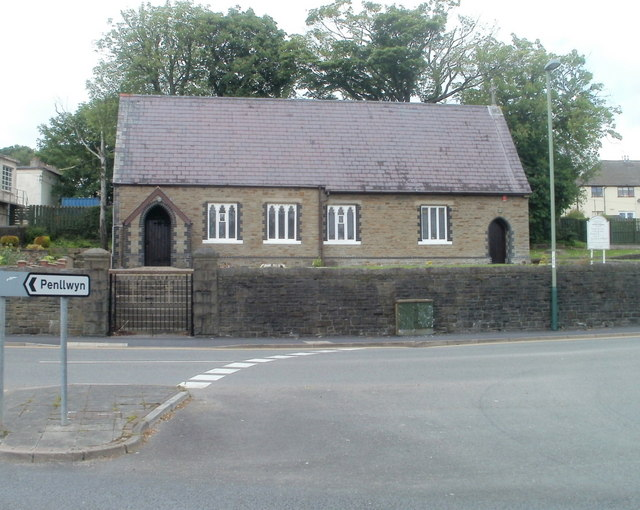
Sacred Heart, Pontllanfraith

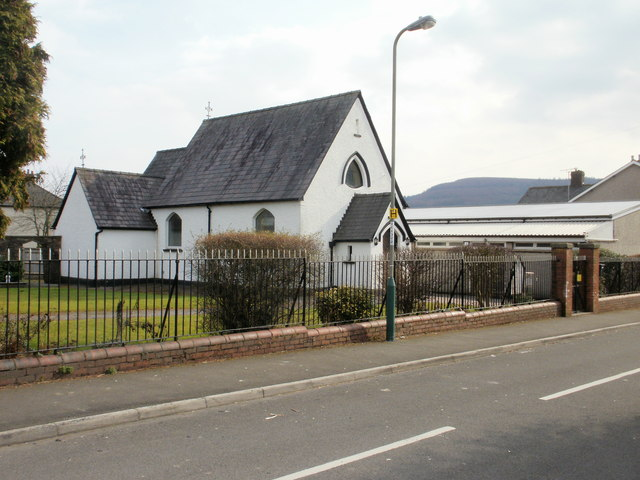
St Anthony of Padua and St Clare, Risca

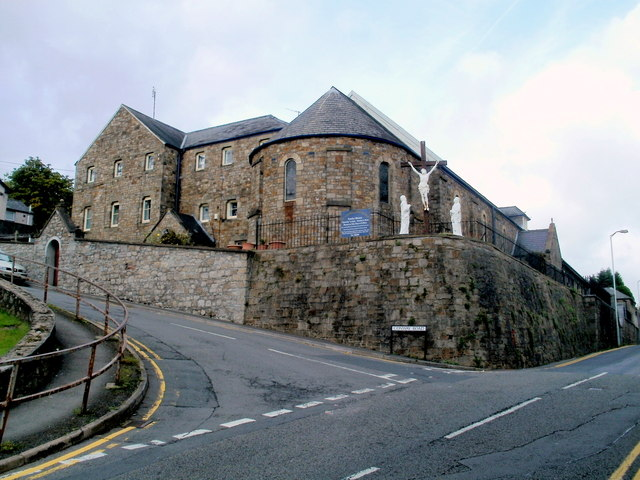
St Alban, Pontypool

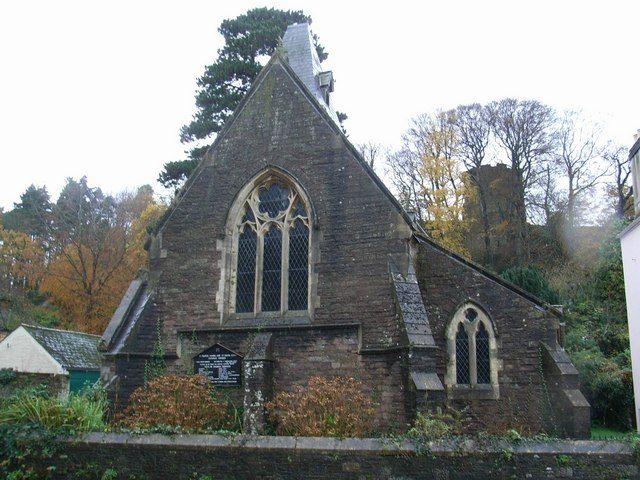
Ss David Lewis and Francis Xavier, Usk

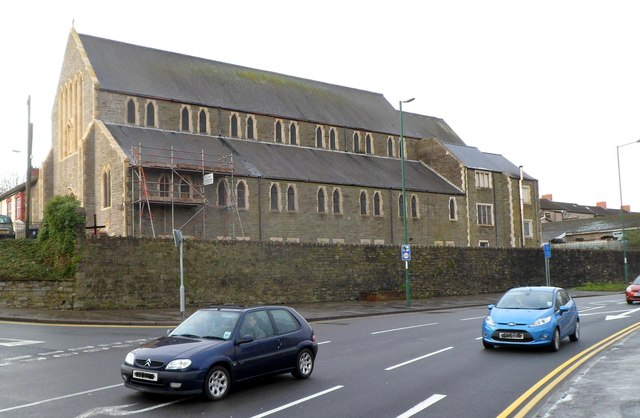
All Saints, Ebbw Vale
