= Llangovan =

Coordinates: 51.745323°N 2.788113°W

Llangovan: Welsh: Llangofan
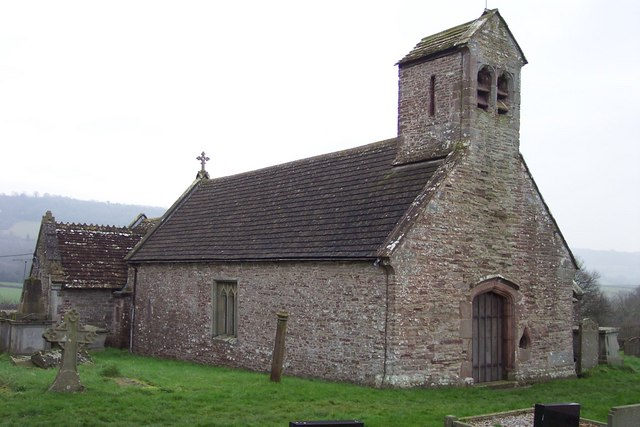
- Llangovan Church

- Location within Monmouthshire
- OS grid reference: SO457057
- Principal area: Monmouthshire
- Preserved county: Gwent
- Country: Wales
- Sovereign state: United Kingdom
- Post town: MONMOUTH
- Postcode district: NP25
- Dialling code: 01600
- Police: Gwent
- Fire: South Wales
- Ambulance: Welsh
- UK Parliament: Monmouth

Llangovan (Welsh: Llangofan) is a small village in Monmouthshire, south east Wales, United Kingdom. It is located 5 miles (8.0 km) south west of Monmouth.

== History and amenities ==
Llangovan is close to Monmouth, the county town and is set in a rural area of rolling hills beneath the Trellech ridge. The Church of St Govan is a Grade II* Listed Building. It is now closed and has a colony of bats. The churchyard contains an ornate medieval stone cross which is a Grade II listed building and a Scheduled monument.

At Llanwinney are the remains of a chapel which bears the inscription "Bethel Chapel Erected in 1841". Nearby Court St. Lawrence, once home of Sir Geoffrey David Inkin, the High Sheriff of Gwent, is also a Grade II listed building. In 2007 Penyclawdd and Llangovan Village Hall was completely refurbished.

== Notable people ==
- Sawnder Sion, 16th century poet
