= David Lewis (Jesuit priest) =

Welsh Jesuit saint (1616–1679)

Saint David Lewis SJ
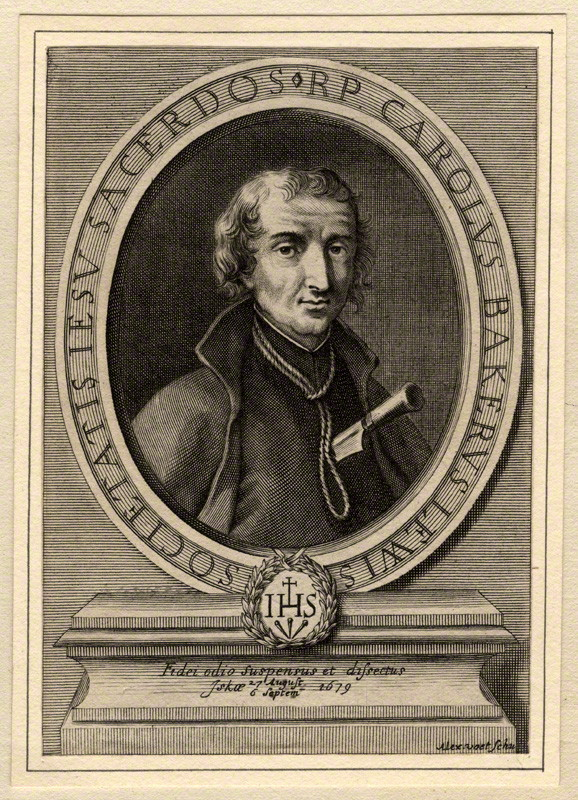
- David Lewis, engraving by Alexander Voet (1683)

Martyr
- Born: 1616; Abergavenny, Monmouthshire, Wales, Kingdom of England
- Died: 27 August 1679 (aged 62–63); Usk, Monmouthshire, Wales
- Venerated in: Catholic Church
- Beatified: 15 December 1929 by Pope Pius XI
- Canonized: 25 October 1970, Vatican City by Pope Paul VI
- Feast: 27 August

David Lewis, S.J. (1616 – 27 August 1679) was a Jesuit Catholic priest and martyr who was also known as Charles Baker and widely referred to in the Welsh language as Tad y Tlodion ("Father of the Poor"). During the religious persecution of the Catholic Church in Wales, which began under Henry VIII and ended only with Catholic Emancipation in 1829, Lewis served as superior of the illegal and underground Jesuit mission based at Cwm until his arrest by priest hunter John Arnold of Monmouthshire. In addition to his priestly ministry, Lewis stood accused of involvement in the Popish Plot, a regime change conspiracy theory concocted by Titus Oates and used by the dominant Whig political party as a pretext to launch an anti-Catholic moral panic and witch hunt during the Stuart Restoration. After being tried and convicted of high treason at Monmouth, Lewis was hanged, drawn and quartered at Usk on 27 August 1679.

Lewis was canonized by Pope Paul VI in 1970 as one of the Forty Martyrs of England and Wales and is venerated as a saint in the Catholic Church. The site of Lewis' execution is now occupied by a Catholic parish church dedicated to him, which remains a site of annual Christian pilgrimage upon the anniversary of his martyrdom. His feast day is celebrated on 27 August.

== Early life ==
Lewis, the youngest of nine children of Anglican clergyman Reverend Morgan Lewis, the headmaster of a grammar school, and Margaret Pritchard, a Catholic, was born at Abergavenny, Monmouthshire, in 1616. His cousin was another future martyr – John Kemble.

At 16 years of age, while visiting Paris, he converted to Catholicism from Anglicanism and subsequently went to study at the English College, Rome, where he assumed the alias "Charles Baker", a common practice among Catholic priests to avoid priest hunters, spies, and informers in the employ of the Crown. He was ordained a Catholic priest on 20 July 1642. Three years later, he joined the Society of Jesus.

He returned to his native land for a year. Then he was appointed spiritual director to the seminarians at the English College in Rome. After his mission in Rome had been completed, he came back to Monmouthshire and worked for 30 years in the apostolate paying much attention to the poor people and people in need. Due to this, he was known as Tad y Tlodion ("Father of the Poor").

== Arrest and execution ==
Excerpt from the last words of Lewis

My religion is Roman Catholic; in it I have loved above these forty years; in it now I die, and so fixedly die, that if all the good things in the world were offered to me to renounce it, all should not remove me one hair’s breadth from the Roman Catholic faith. A Roman Catholic I am; a Roman Catholic priest I am; a Roman Catholic priest of that order known as the Society of Jesus, I am;

—

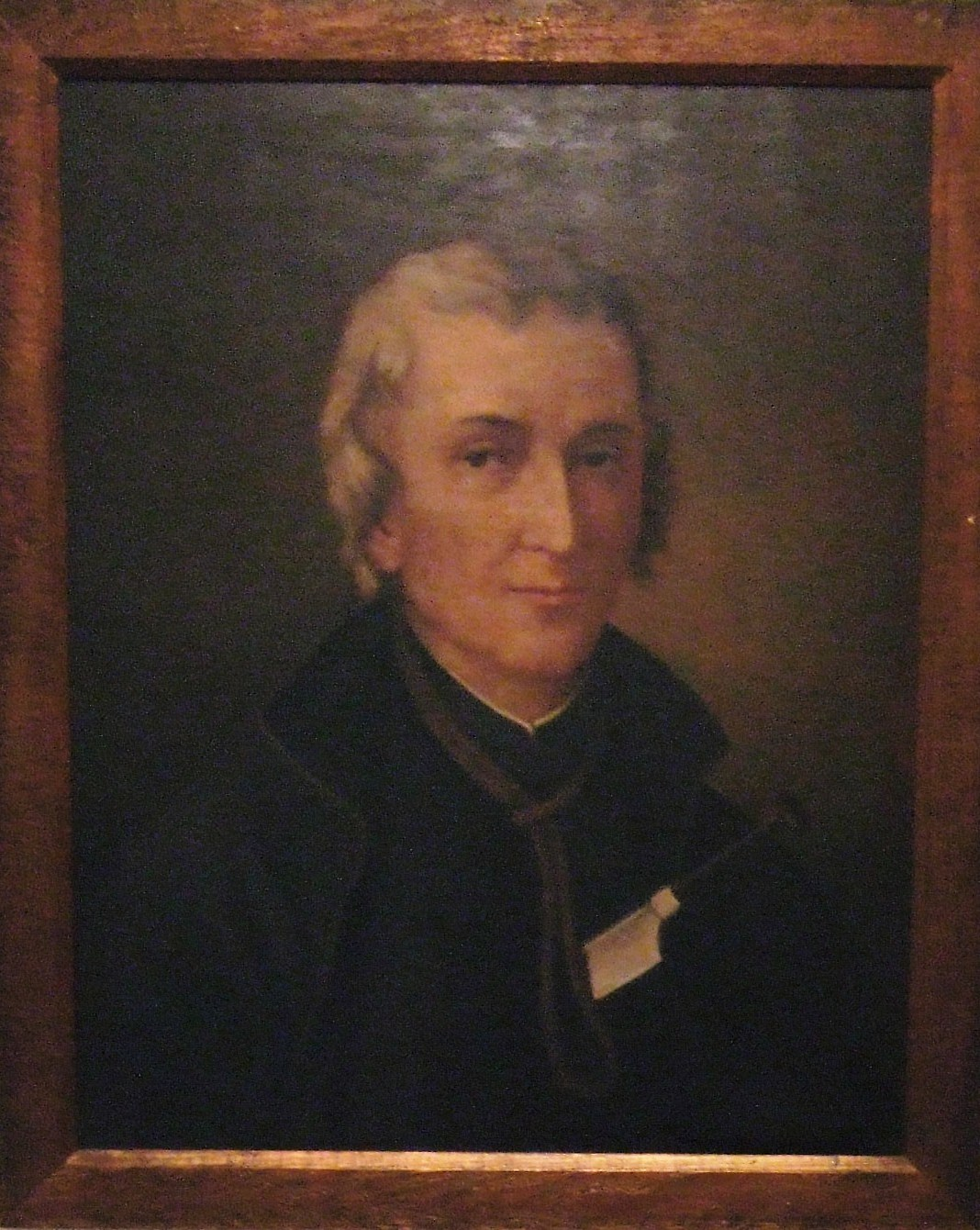
Oil painting after the engraving, Llantarnam Abbey

He was arrested on 17 November 1678 at St Michael's Church, Llantarnam, then in Monmouthshire, and condemned at the Assizes in Monmouth in March 1679 as a Catholic priest and for saying Catholic Masses. He was accused of attempting to kill Charles II and trying to restore the Catholic faith in Wales. He was betrayed by an apostate couple who had been promised an award of 50 pounds for the Jesuit's capture, and another sum of 200 pounds was promised by Whig magistrate and priest hunter John Arnold of Monmouthshire, whom Jan Morris has dubbed, "the most ferocious... of all the persecutors of the Catholics in Wales", to those who could help in his exposure. Like John Wall and John Kemble, he was then sent to London to be examined by Titus Oates (the originator of the Popish Plot) and other informers.

He was brought for trial at the Lenten Assizes in Monmouth on 16 March 1679, on a charge of high treason – for having become a Catholic priest and then remaining in England, contrary to the Jesuits, etc. Act 1584.

He pleaded not guilty to the charge of being an accessory to the Popish Plot. However, five or six witnesses claimed they had seen him say Mass and perform other priestly duties. For this, Lewis was found guilty and sentenced to death by Sir Robert Atkyns. The condemned priest was brought to Newgate Prison in London with John Kemble (Herefordshire) and questioned about the "plot". Oates and his fellow informers William Bedloe, Stephen Dugdale and Miles Prance were unable to prove anything against him. Lord Shaftesbury advised him that if he gave evidence at the trials of other defendants charged in the "plot" or renounced his Catholic faith by taking the Test Act, his life would be spared and he would be greatly rewarded. Lewis said, however, in his dying speech, "discover the plot I could not, as I knew of none; and conform I would not, for it was against my conscience". His last words before execution were:

I speak not as a murderer, thief or such-like malefactor, but as a Christian, and therefore am not ashamed.

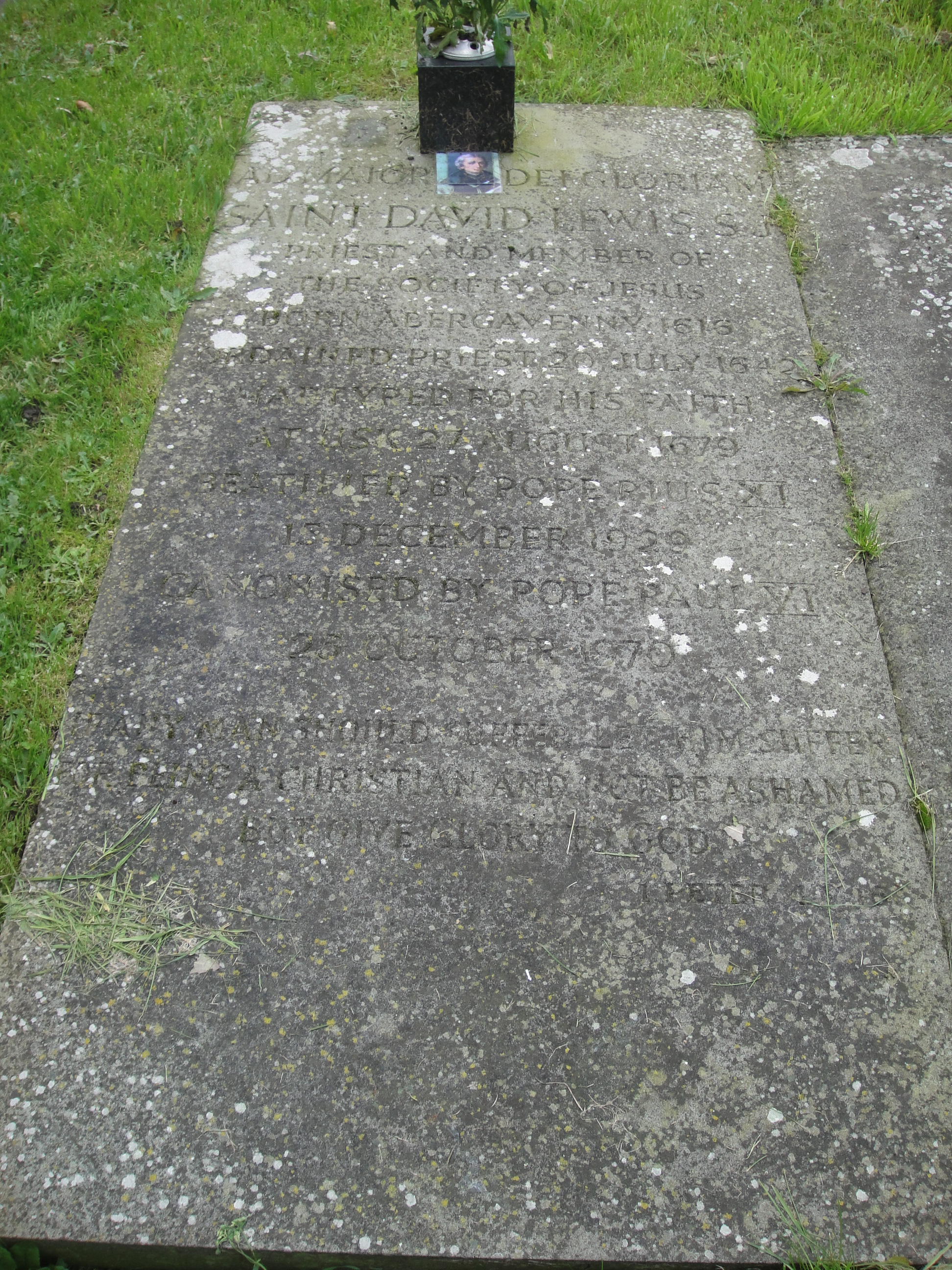
Grave of St David Lewis

He was brought back to Usk in Monmouthshire for his execution by John Arnold of Monmouthshire, prayed at the Gunter Mansion and was hanged on 27 August 1679 and then posthumously disembowelled. It was a tribute to the esteem in which he was held that the crowd, mainly Protestants, insisted that he be allowed to hang until he was dead and receive a proper burial. The Sheriff, who knew and liked Lewis, refused to attend the execution, which he had postponed for as long as he could.

After the Titus Oates affair (1679–80), the remaining Welsh-speaking Catholic clergy were either executed or exiled. Lewis was the last Welshman to become a Jesuit until 2001, more than 300 years later.

== Recognition ==
Together with John Wall, John Kemble and 37 other martyrs, David Lewis was canonized by Pope Paul VI in 1970 – the Forty Martyrs of England and Wales. In November 2007, a plaque was erected on the spot where Lewis was arrested near Llantarnam Abbey. The Catholic church in Usk is St David Lewis and St Francis Xavier Church.
