= Joy Ballard =

British head teacher

- Born: 1966 (age 59–60)
- Occupation: Head teacher
- Employers: Willows High School; Ryde Academy
- Known for: Educating Cardiff

Joy Ballard (born 1966) is a retired British head teacher. She has been featured in the media discussing the potential for improvement in schools and issues with the British education system.

Ballard grew up in Southampton on a council estate, and became notable as the former head teacher of Willows High School in Cardiff. She appeared in the television documentary series Educating Cardiff for her role in making Willows High School one of the most improved schools in Wales during her three-year term as head teacher.

In August 2015, she became the head teacher of Ryde Academy on the Isle of Wight. The Hampshire County Council had been overseeing education on the Isle since 2013 because of concerns over the school's former sponsor, Academies Enterprise Trust (AET), and their lack of regard for the "welfare or education of students or staff." Ballard improved the exam results of the school in twelve months as head teacher. She has appeared on This Morning with Eamonn Holmes, and was interviewed on Capital FM radio.

After her stint at Ryde Academy, Ballard retired in September 2024. In 2026, her actions at Ryde Academy were investigated by the Teaching Regulation Agency (TRA). It had been alleged that she borrowed a car from the school whilst on holiday, and that she altered dates of school holidays for her convenience. The TRA found that these allegations were true, and that she had committed "misconduct of a serious nature", and in July 2026, she was banned from teaching for two years.
