= Pontypridd Deanery =

The Pontypridd Deanery is a Roman Catholic deanery in the Archdiocese of Cardiff-Menevia, previously in the Archdiocese of Cardiff, which covers several churches and the university chaplaincy in Pontypridd and the surrounding area of Rhondda, the southernmost part of the Cynon Valley, and Caerphilly. In the early 2000s, the Head of the Valleys deanery was split. The churches in its western part, in the county boroughs of Merthyr Tydfil and Rhondda Cynon Taf, became part of the Pontypridd deanery and the churches in its eastern part, in the county borough of Blaenau Gwent, became part of the North Gwent Deanery.

== Churches ==
- St Thomas, Abercynon
- St Peter, Bargoed – served from Abercynon
- St Helen, Caerphilly
- Our Lady of Lourdes, Mountain Ash
- St Joseph, Aberdare – served from Mountain Ash
- St Therese of Lisieux, Hirwaun – served from Mountain Ash
- St Mary, Merthyr Tydfil
- St Aloysius, Gurnos – served from Merthyr Tydfil
- St Illtyd, Dowlais – served from Merthyr Tydfil
- St Benedict, Merthyr Vale – served from Merthyr Tydfil
- Ss Gabriel and Raphael, Tonypandy
- St Dyfrig, Treforest
- Glamorgan University Chaplaincy – served from Treforest
- All Hallows, Llantrisant- served from Treforest
- St Mary Magdalene, Ynyshir

== Gallery ==
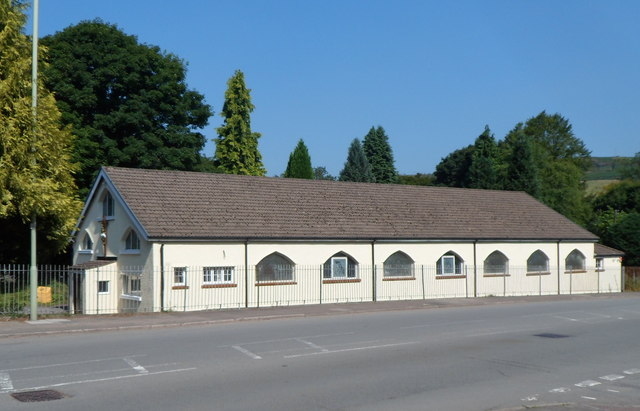
St Thomas, Abercynon

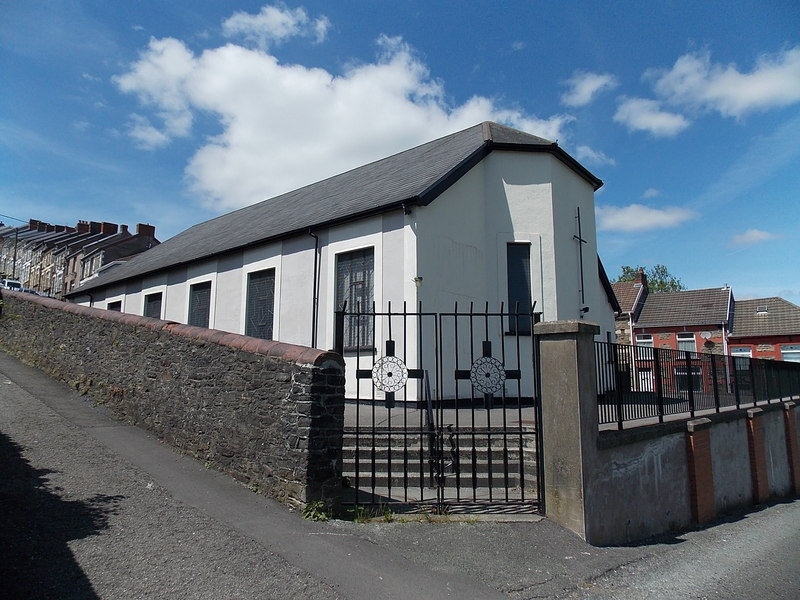
St Peter, Bargoed

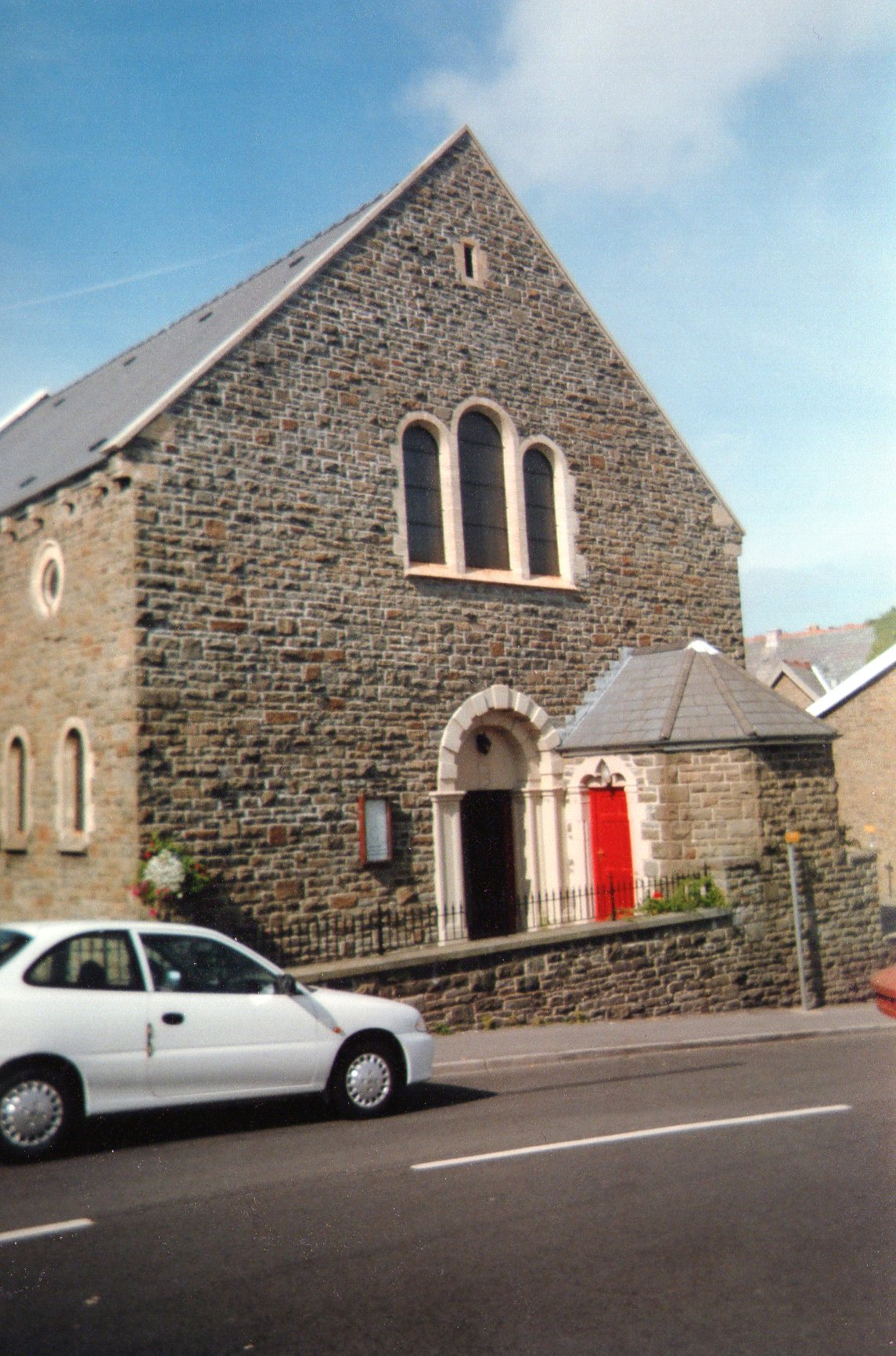
St Joseph, Aberdare

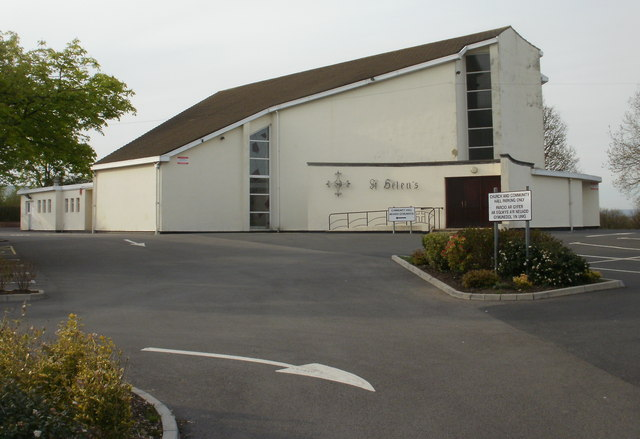
St Helen, Caerphilly

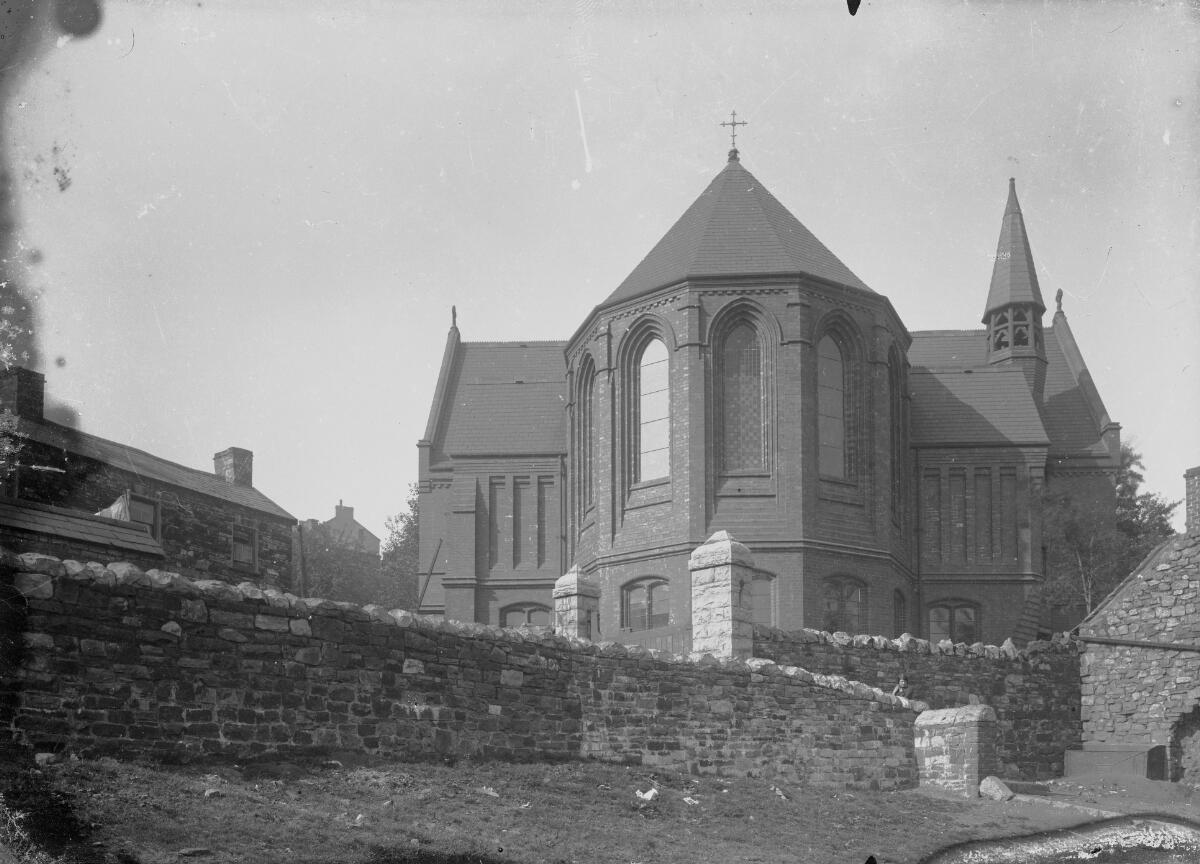
St Illtyd's Church, Dowlais

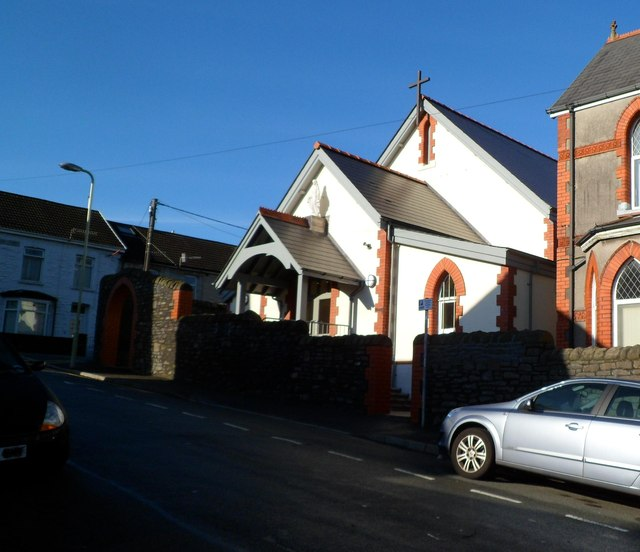
Ss Gabriel and Raphael, Tonypandy

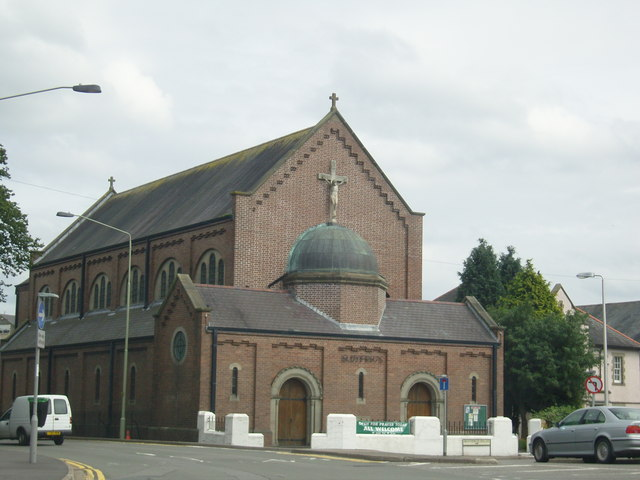
St Dyfrig, Treforest

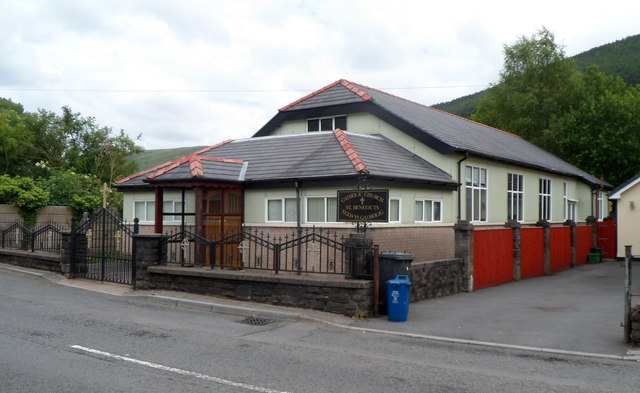
St Benedict, Merthyr Vale

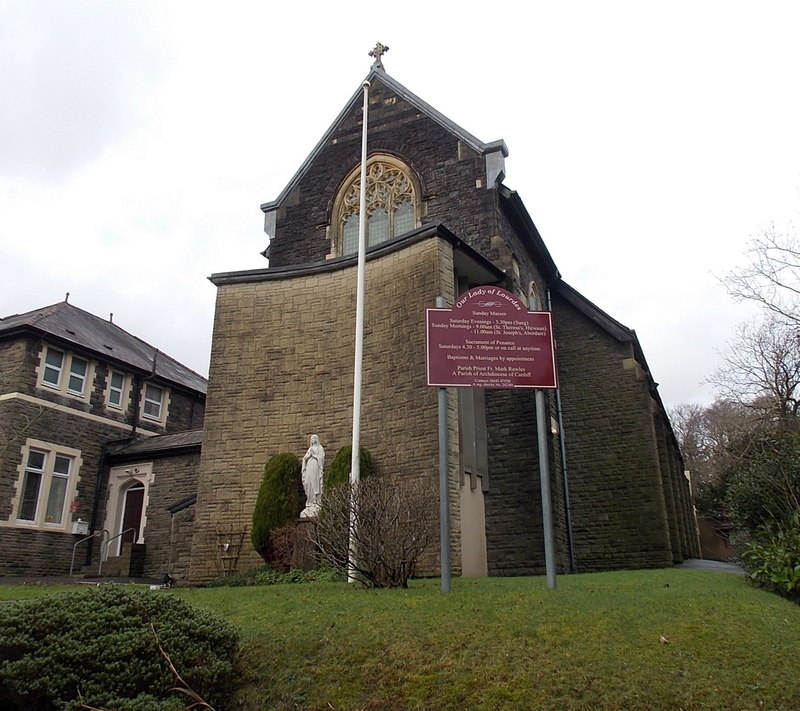
Our Lady of Lourdes, Mountain Ash
