= St Dyfrig's Church, Treforest =

St Dyfrig's Church
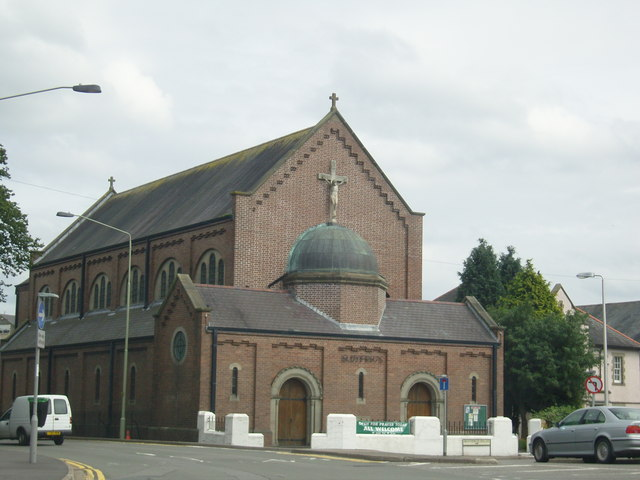
- St Dyfrig's in 2008
- St Dyfrig's Church
- 51.5949°N 3.3247°W
- Denomination: Roman Catholic

History
- Status: Active

Architecture
- Functional status: Active
- Heritage designation: Grade II
- Designated: 26 February 2001
- Architect(s): Probably F. R. Bates & Son
- Style: Byzantine Revival
- Completed: 1927

Administration
- Archdiocese: Cardiff-Menevia
- Deanery: Pontypridd

St Dyfrig's Church is a listed Roman Catholic church in the village of Treforest near Pontypridd, South Wales. The church was founded in the 19th century, though the present structure dates from the 1920s.

== Original church ==
A Catholic presence began in Treforest soon after the Great Famine in Ireland (1840s), when many Irish immigrants arrived in South Wales. At the time, there was no place of worship in Treforest, and spiritual needs were catered for by clergy travelling in from Merthyr Tydfil and Aberdare. A school was founded in c. 1850, though Aberdare continued issuing baptismal certificates for the district until 1868. The first St Dyfrig's (the saint was first referred to by his Latin name of Dubricius) was opened on Bridge Street in 1868. At first, the school was annexed to it, but in 1884 it moved to a new location, where it remained into the early 1960s.

== Current church ==
Soon after the First World War, the original church was becoming too small for its congregation. In 1914, Senghennydd was partitioned from Treforest, with the congregants from the area transferring to the new All Souls Church in Senghenydd, though overcrowding remained a problem at St Dubricius', with worshippers sometimes obliged to sit outside the door. Work began on the replacement church on Broadway in 1926, and it was consecrated on 24 November 1927 by Archbishop Francis Mostyn. In the 1930s, the dedication was amended from Dubricius to Dyfrig. There was a reordering in the 1950s, when a new altar was installed. A life-sized crucifix and side-panels were added in 1999 by Penanne Crabbe. The church gained Listed status in 2001. The church is open during the week, and as the only Catholic church within easy distance of the University of South Wales' Treforest campus, it is often attended by students during term time.
