= Willows High School =

- Ysgol Uwchradd Willows

Location
- Willows Avenue; Tremorfa; Cardiff, CF24 2YE; United Kingdom; 51°29′3″N 3°8′13″W

Information
- Type: State Secondary
- Motto: Perthyn, Credu, Llwyddo (Belong, Believe, Achieve)
- Opened: 1967
- Educational authority: Cardiff Council
- Head teacher: Chris Norman
- Years: 7–11
- Enrolment: 586
- Language: English
- Houses: Harlech (blue), Caernarfon (green), Denbigh (yellow), Raglan (red)
- Website: www.willowshigh.co.uk

Willows High School (Welsh: Ysgol Uwchradd Willows) is a secondary school located in the Tremorfa area of Cardiff, Wales. It caters for pupils aged 11 to 16 and is English-medium. As of September 2015, the headteacher is Chris Norman. He succeeded Joy Ballard, under whom the proportion of pupils attaining five A*-C grades rose from 14% to 50%. In recent years, Willows has been oversubscribed for pupils.

== History ==
The school site is extensive and dates from the late 1960s, and was built on the site of the World War II airfield RAF Pengam Moors. The school is named after the air balloon pioneer Ernest Willows who had his airfield on the site.

Many of the buildings have since been modernised. There are plans to continue this modernisation in the future, including with a PFI agreement as part of plans by Cardiff Council. A completely new building is planned, which could be located in nearby Tremorfa Park. The site proposed originally included St. Alban's Primary School, which was slated to close. However, in 2019 the closure was successfully petitioned, and stopped in 2020.The new school building is scheduled to open in October 2026.

The school featured in the 2015 Channel 4 documentary series Educating Cardiff. This detailed every aspect of school life, and also highlighted many of the improvements the school has made in recent years.

Starting in 2015, Willows participated in the South Wales Challenge (SWC) Initiative, sharing best-practice in education with Tonyrefail School, Rhondda Cynon Taf. This aimed to help the school to improve academic standards further.

== Estyn Inspections ==
In 2012, Estyn rated the school as "unsatisfactory", reporting that it needed "significant improvement". The inspectors reported that, although pupils often had unsatisfactory English grammar and literacy skills, leadership was "adequate" and there were real prospects of improvement. The school substantially improved after this, and by 2014 no longer requires significant improvement. However, the more recent 2018 has found there are still many aspects of school life that could be improved, particularly in the methods of teaching and leadership. Despite this, the school had improved enough that in 2019 it was removed from monitoring by Estyn.

There were 586 pupils at the school during the 2018 Estyn inspection, a significant drop since the 2012 inspection. The proportion of pupils receiving free school meals is 44%, which is much higher than the national average of 17.4%. Almost two-thirds of the pupils live in the 20% most deprived areas in Wales. Around 8% of pupils have English as an additional language. Twenty-nine per cent of the pupils come from minority ethnic backgrounds.

== Former students ==
Notable former students include Jessica Leigh Jones.
