= RAF Pengam Moors =

Former Royal Air Force station in Cardiff, Wales

RAF Pengam Moors RAF Cardiff – 43 MU
- Tremorfa, Cardiff in Wales
- RAF Pengam Moors from the air. The two Bellman hangars can be seen at top left of picture.

Site information
- Owner: Air Ministry
- Operator: Royal Air Force
- Controlled by: RAF Maintenance Command

Location
- Shown within Cardiff RAF Pengam Moors (the United Kingdom)
- Coordinates: 51°29′08″N 03°07′56″W

Site history
- Built: 1938
- In use: 1938-1946
- Battles/wars: Second World War

Airfield information
Runways
Direction	Length and surface
NE/SW	853 metres (2,799 ft) Concrete

Royal Air Force Pengam Moors, or more simply RAF Pengam Moors, (or also known as RAF Cardiff), is a former Royal Air Force station and maintenance unit (MU), located on the Pengam Moors area of Tremorfa, situated 2 miles (3.2 km) south east of Cardiff city centre in Wales, from June 1938 to January 1946.

Prior to RAF service the site served as a private aerodrome later called Cardiff Municipal Airport. After the Second World War the airfield reverted to private commercial flying until closure in 1954 when all services were transferred to the larger Rhoose Airport. The runway has since been removed and the site has been covered with industrial units, private housing and a school, with the names of many roads reflecting the previous history as an airfield.

== History ==
=== Pre Second World War ===
The site had been associated with flying since as early as 1905 when Ernest Willows built his first airship at Pengam. His third airship Willows No. 3 – City of Cardiff flew from Cardiff to London on 6 August 1910. The flight established Willows as the first person to fly across the Bristol Channel and was the longest flight achieved in Britain at the time. He immediately followed this with a flight from London to Paris establishing the first airship flight across the English Channel at night.

The original privately operated airfield, on land in Splott purchased from Lord Tredegar, was opened for private club and leisure flying in September 1931, only later changing its name from Splott Aerodrome to Cardiff Municipal Airport when scheduled passenger flights began. The early accommodation was limited to wooden hutting and hangars. The aerodrome fronted on the Severn Estuary and to protect the single grassed runway from flooding, a sea wall was constructed.

British Air Navigation Co Ltd initially operated its services using de Havilland Fox Moths and de Havilland Dragons. In April 1933 Great Western Railway Air Services began flights to Little Haldon, Devon, Plymouth and Birmingham using Westland Wessex aircraft. In 1934, Great Western Railway Air Services was amalgamated with several other small airlines into the new Railway Air Services and upgraded to de Havilland DH.89 Dragon Rapides, the same aircraft type that was flown by Western Airways.

In 1933, Western Airways launched the service to Weston-super-Mare, with 13 flights each way daily at a charge of 6 shillings and 6 pence (thirty two and a half pence – or £16.70 in today's terms), only later extending to Bournemouth and France. Railway Air Services resumed peacetime flights in early 1946, now using its newly acquired fleet of Avro Ansons and ex-RAF Douglas DC-3s.

In 1939, the UK's Air Transport Licensing Authority came into being and gave Western Airways the monopoly for all airline flights into and out of Cardiff.

At various times a range of commercial service flights were introduced. In 1932 British Air Navigation Co Ltd offered twice daily return flights between Cardiff and Whitchurch Aerodrome, Bristol. The following year Great Western Railway Air Services began a triangular service between Cardiff, Haldon and Plymouth; while Western Airways operated to Weston-super-Mare (and later to Christchurch Aerodrome, Bournemouth). In 1934 Great Western Railway Air Services started serving Elmdon Aerodrome, Birmingham; and Railway Air Service Company connected Cardiff to Roborough Aerodrome, Plymouth and Speke Aerodrome, Liverpool. In 1935 Western Airways commenced international flights to France, with services to Le Touquet Airport and to Le Bourget Aerodrome in Paris.

=== Wartime RAF use ===
The site was surveyed by War Department engineers and in August 1936 a decision to build a Royal Auxiliary Air Force station at Pengam Moors was made. Additional land was requisitioned to extend the length of the existing runway and provide space for a technical site. The buildings works were completed in 1938, with the provision of several brick built offices, hangars and with most accommodation housed in temporary Nissen and Quonset hutting. The headquarters site was in the north-west corner of the station and the technical site in the south-west corner located on the requisitioned former vegetable allotments.

In June 1938 No 614 (Glamorgan) Squadron RAuxAF was formed and took up residence at RAF Pengam Moors. Established as an army co-operation squadron on target spotting and range finding duties it was equipped with Hawker Hinds and Hawker Hectors until July 1939 when the squadron was re-equipped with Westland Lysanders. No. 614 Squadron remained at Pengam Moors until June 1940 when it was redeployed to RAF Inverness in Scotland and retasked onto coastal patrol duties.

In January 1940 a flight of three crews from 815 Naval Air Squadron relocated to RAF Pengam Moors from RNAS Worthy Down flying Fairey Swordfish torpedo bombers on anti-submarine patrols in the Bristol Channel and English Channel. Their role was to locate German submarines and either sink them or prevent them from surfacing and attacking the large number of convoys arriving at Cardiff and Bristol with supplies from America and Canada.

In February 1940, the RAF established No. 43 Maintenance Unit RAF (MU) at RAF Pengam Moors. The unit was tasked principally with dismantling, packing and despatching fighter aircraft to overseas locations. The Supermarine Spitfires, Hawker Hurricanes, Westland Lysanders and light bombers were flown into Pengam Moors from factories all over the UK. The staff at 43 MU dismantled the aircraft and crated them ready for loading onto freighters at Cardiff Docks, where they sailed to restock squadrons in Gibraltar, Malta and North Africa and other far flung theatres of war. The 43 MU facility remained in operation throughout the remainder of the war and was closed in October 1945.

In November 1940, No. 8 Anti-Aircraft Co-operation Unit RAF (AACU) were based at the airfield with a variety of aircraft, but mainly Miles Martinet target tugs, to provide towed airborne targets for anti-aircraft gunnery training. The unit was amalgamated into No. 577 Squadron RAF in December 1943 and remained at Pengam Moors until the station closed in 1946.

In 1941 two Bellman hangars were built on the site, together with additional hardstanding and a Sommerfield perimeter trackway. In 1942 the grassed strip was replaced with an 853 m (2,800 ft) concrete runway.

Throughout the Second World War RAF Pengam Moors was used as an emergency landing field for Spitfires, Hurricanes and other aircraft from RAF Colerne, RAF Fairwood Common. RAF Filton and RAF Pembrey damaged in air battles over the Bristol Channel ports during nightly air raids by German raiders.

The following units were also here at some point:

- No. 3 Reserve Flying School RAF
- No. 52 Maintenance Unit RAF
- No. 62 Gliding School RAF
- No. 286 Squadron RAF
- No. 663 Squadron RAF
- No. 1952 Reserve Air Observation Post Flight RAF

=== Post-war ===
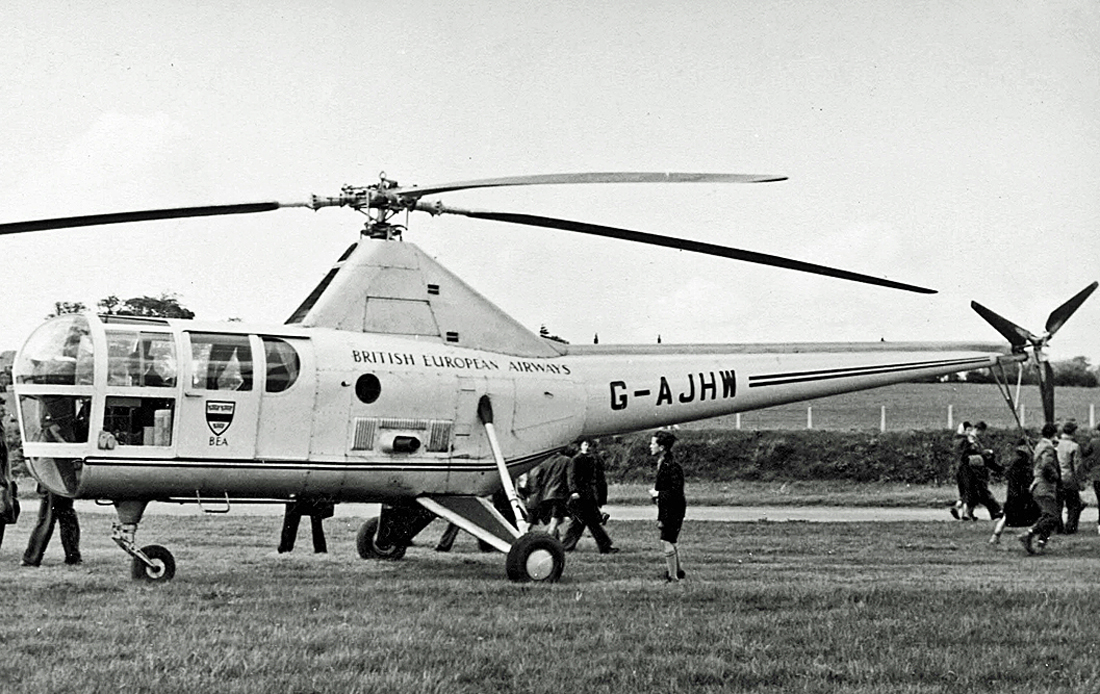
British European Airways Sikorsky S-51 helicopter used on the 1950 service via Wrexham to Liverpool Speke Airport

In January 1946 RAF Pengam Moors was closed as a military establishment. The facility was handed back to Cardiff City Council and civilian flying recommenced from the airfield with the principal operator being Cambrian Air Services (later renamed Cambrian Airways), although it never regained the number of routes that had existed pre-war, as passenger aircraft were now larger and the short runway inadequate. During 1950 British European Airways operated an experimental helicopter scheduled service via Wrexham to Liverpool's Speke Airport.

The airfield became redundant when all civilian flying was transferred on 1 April 1954 to the expanding facility at the new Rhoose Airport that was being developed on the site of the former RAF Rhoose. The longer runways at Rhoose were more suitable for jet passenger aircraft and its remote location meant less noise problems over built up city areas.

The Pengam Moors airfield site (now more commonly known as 'Pengam Green') has largely been turned over to residential and business uses including a Tesco Extra supermarket and Willows High School. Although there are almost no signs remaining of its former use, a few of the original buildings and road layouts still remain. Residential streets on the site bear names that hint at its history – including Runway Road, De Havilland Road, Handley Road and Avro Close. Cardiff Bus runs a dedicated 11 service that operates between the city centre and Pengam Green, terminating at the Tesco Extra supermarket. Due to its close proximity to the Rhymney River, Cardiff Council have started to produce plans to improve the river's defences to prevent the area from flooding.

== See also ==
- List of former Royal Air Force stations
