= Tremorfa =

District and community of Cardiff, Wales

- Location within Cardiff
- Population: 1,638
- OS grid reference: ST208773
- Principal area: Cardiff
- Preserved county: South Glamorgan
- Country: Wales
- Sovereign state: United Kingdom
- Post town: CARDIFF
- Postcode district: CF24
- Dialling code: 029
- Police: South Wales
- Fire: South Wales
- Ambulance: Welsh
- UK Parliament: Cardiff South and Penarth
- Senedd Cymru – Welsh Parliament: Cardiff South and Penarth
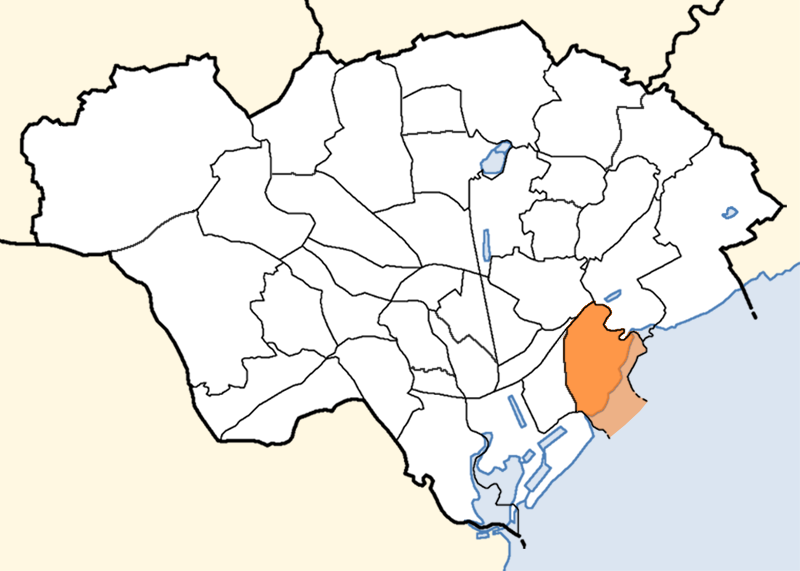
- List of places UK Wales Cardiff 51.49°N 3.14°W Map of the community

Tremorfa (Welsh for 'tre (town) + morfa (coastal marsh)') is a district and community of the city of Cardiff, Wales. It falls into the Splott ward of Cardiff.

== Transport ==
Tremorfa is served by the Cardiff Bus 11 route (was 61 for a few years as the Pentrebane route was extended) operating from Pengam Green to the city centre via Tremorfa, Splott and Adamsdown. It is also served by the numbers 1 and 2 City Circle service.

Adamsdown	Penylan	Rumney
Splott	Tremorfa	Trowbridge
Butetown

== Employment ==
The rate of unemployment in Tremorfa is both higher than the average for Cardiff and higher than the national average, suggesting that finding a job in this area may be hard. The rate of claiming any benefit (which includes in work benefits) is more than 10% lower in Tremorfa than the national average, suggesting higher salaries than the average in the area.

=== Social grade and occupation statistics ===
Social grade is a classification based on occupation and it enables a household and all its members to be classified according to the job of the main income earner. Tremorfa has 20% more higher and intermediate managerial, administrative or professional households than the national average.

== Education ==
Education statistics are for the highest level education obtained by the residents of Tremorfa and are from the UK Census of 2011. Tremorfa has a lower level of residents with either no qualifications or qualifications equal to 1 or more GCSE at grade D or below, than the national average. Tremorfa also has a high level of residents with a higher education qualification (level 4) than the national average.

=== Schools ===
Tremorfa is served by several schools. The only high school is Willows High School which is situated on Willows Avenue. The school was once described as "unsatisfactory" and in need of "significant improvement" by the education watchdog Estyn. The school has now substantially improved and is no longer requiring significant improvement. Willows High was featured in the Channel 4 documentary Educating Cardiff in 2015. One of the primary schools across the road from STAR Hub is Baden Powell Primary.

== Government ==
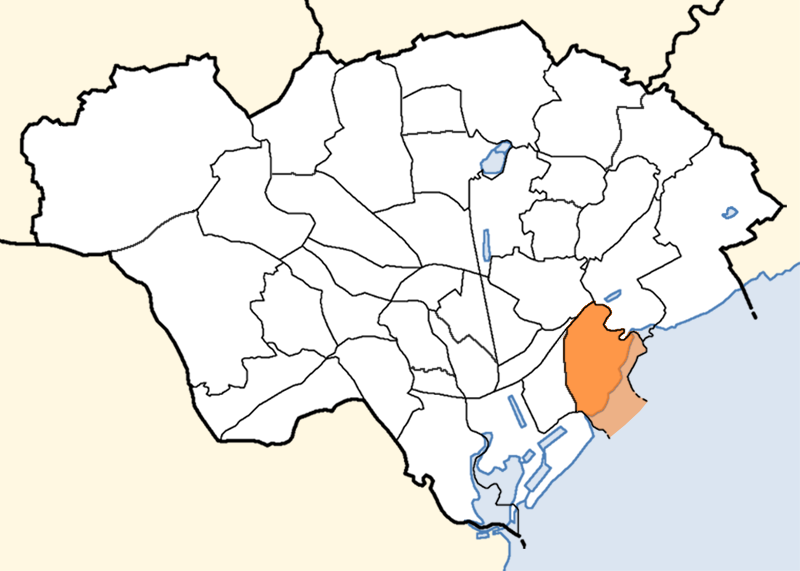
Location of the Tremorfa community (post-2016) within Cardiff

In 2016, Tremorfa became one of four new communities in Cardiff, having previously been part of the Splott community. There is no community council for the area. The nearby area of Pengam Green, which is connected through Tremorfa Park, is classed as being part of the Tremorfa community.

== Events ==
In December 2015, Christmas 'Pugfest' was held at Action Petz play centre in Tremorfa, with more than 1,500 visitors and around 400 pugs. It was one of the fun events for pugs set up nationally by Rob Clowes in memory of his dog, Poppy. In 2017 Prince Harry and his now wife Meghan Markle visited the STAR Hub, across the road from Baden Powell Primary School. Around 2000 people turned up just to see them pull up in the Range Rover Sport with an escort of motorbikes and police cars and secret service vehicles.

== See also ==
- John Brooks, Baron Brooks of Tremorfa (1927–2016), instrumental in the redevelopment of the Docks area of Cardiff now known as Cardiff Bay.
- RAF Pengam Moors, for the history of the aerodrome between 1905 and 1954.
