= Worshipful Company of Scientific Instrument Makers =

Livery company of the City of London

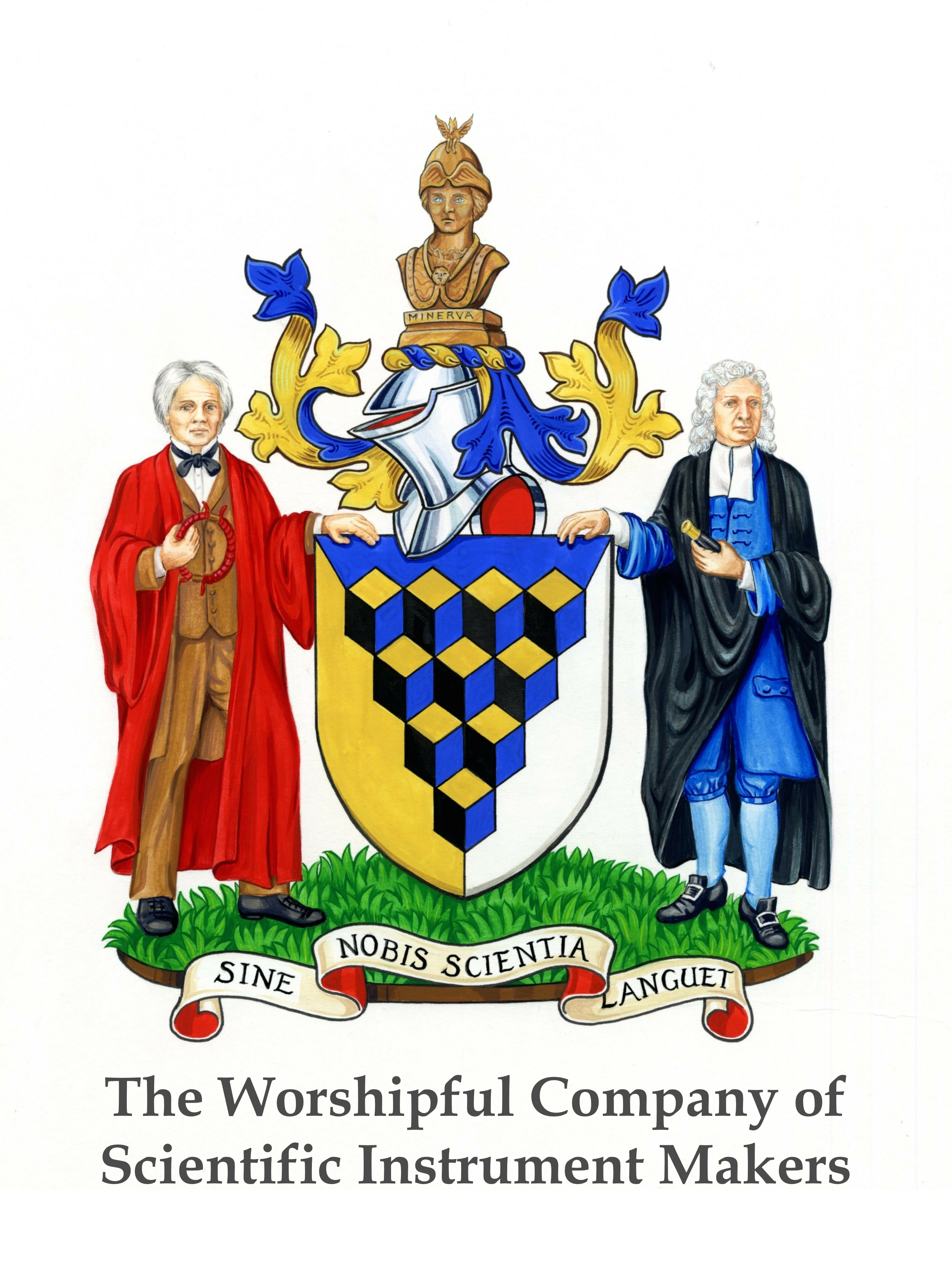
- Arms: Tierce in pairle azure, Or and argent, ten cubes conjoined in perspective, four, three, two and one, the tops also Or, the dexter and sinister sides sable and azure respectively
- Motto: Sine Nobis Scientia Languet; Latin for Science Languishes Without Us
- Location: Glaziers Hall, Montague Close, Southwark
- Date of formation: 1956
- Company association: Scientific instrument-makers
- Order of precedence: 84th
- Master of company: Professor Stephen O'Connor
- Website: wcsim.co.uk

The Worshipful Company of Scientific Instrument Makers is one of the 114 livery companies of the City of London. It ranks 84th in the order of precedence for the livery companies.

== History ==
The company was originally formed in 1956 when science and manufacturing were key to the UK economy and the memory of war time defence requirements were still fresh and the UK was a large-scale manufacturer of specialist electronic and mechanical scientific instruments. It is one of the Modern Livery Companies formed since 1926 having been granted its livery status by the City in 1963. In 2021, it was granted a Royal Charter.

As with the original Livery Companies it supports the profession and the craft of scientific instrument making, this is achieved through the exchange of ideas and information between members and guests, and also by its charitable donations supporting those in or retired from the profession.

The Company shares Glazier's Hall with two other Companies. The Hall was originally a tea warehouse and is built into the structure of London Bridge. Although the Livery Hall appears to be outside the boundary of the City of London, it is actually in the Ward of Bridge and Bridge Without and so linked to the Bridge Ward Club.

The Livery has a long-standing connection with the Institute of Measurement and Control, the Scientific Instrument Society and a number of other bodies related to measurement such as UKAS, NPL and BSi.

The history of the company has been documented in two publications created by Past Masters and these can be downloaded here.

== Coat of arms ==
The coat of arms includes two key figures from the area of scientific instrument making, Sir Isaac Newton and Michael Faraday. The crest is Minerva the Roman Goddess of wisdom and strategic warfare. It is featured in a stained glass window in the Company church St Margaret Lothbury.

== Membership and Governance ==
Members, although from diverse areas such as nanotechnology, mechanical engineering, genetics and astronomy, industry and academia, must be connected to instrumentation or measurement in some way to join.

The company has four levels of membership. Younger members (from 16 years old) who are still studying or in training can be Apprentices. This enables them to receive financial and/or mentoring support. The next is Freeman, usually someone who is early in their career; then up to Liveryman who are established in their profession and eligible to serve on the Court and progress to Master. Occasionally, Honorary Freemen are admitted as a result of serving the company or profession in some significant way.
