= Educating Cardiff =

- Series 4
- No. of episodes: 8

Release
- Original network: Channel 4
- Original release: 25 August – 13 October 2015

Series chronology
- ← Previous; Series 3 Next → Series 5

Educating Cardiff is the fourth series of the British documentary television programme Educating broadcast on Channel 4. The eight-episode series was broadcast from 25 August 2015 to 13 October 2015. The documentary follows previous instalments in the Educating... series including the BAFTA Award-winning Educating Essex (2011), Educating Yorkshire (2013) and Educating the East End (2014). Filmed at Willows High School in Cardiff, Wales, it captures every detail of life in a modern school. Educating Cardiff follows Head Teacher Joy Ballard and her team of teachers and support staff in their mission to turn the school around, transforming it from one of the worst performing schools in Cardiff into a school to be proud of.

== Episodes ==
No. overall	Episode	Original release date	UK viewers (millions)
28	Episode 1	25 August 2015	2.11
Documentary following pupils and staff at Willows High School, where head teacher Joy Ballard has helped turn around one of the Cardiff's worst-performing schools and introduced a house system with pupils competing against each other to give them a sense of home and pride. Maths teacher Mr Hennessy is also Head of House for Denbigh, overseeing 120 students, and one of his responsibilities is ensuring his students are on time, including aspiring actress Leah, who has one of the school's worst attendance records. Meanwhile, Year 11 Jess has a 100% attendance record and is one of the hardest workers in the school, but fails to understand why other pupils misbehave in class and is mystified by the social aspect of school. In an effort to encourage her to develop socially, Mrs Ballard puts Jess in charge of the school newspaper and challenges her with finding stories and selling as many copies as she can.
29	Episode 2	1 September 2015	2.00
This episode focuses on two new year 7 boys, both in Raglan house. Despite having only been at Willows for a matter of weeks, Assad is regularly in trouble for misbehaving in lessons, and eventually gets suspended after shooting a BB gun in Maths. Head of Raglan house, PE teacher Mr Roberts, finds himself having to regularly speak to Assad about his unbelievable behaviour. Despite his efforts, Assad's behaviour does not improve, to the point where he reduces his Mum to tears when she comes into school to discuss Assad's situation with Mrs Ballard. The focus is also on year 7 Aaron who is very likeable but is finding the transition to secondary school difficult, especially when it comes to making friends. In an effort to help him settle in, Mr Roberts enlists the help of year 10 student and Raglan house captain, Jack, to help Aaron socialise.
30	Episode 3	8 September 2015	1.62
Year 10 girl Megan is very strong academically but her anger outbursts are a let-down for her, resulting in her having several run-ins with staff and fellow students. Deputy Head Mr Norman becomes very concerned when Megan punches a wall and injures her hand. He has several chats with Megan in an effort to try to get to the bottom of her anger problems. Fellow year 10 Katie is regularly in trouble, especially with her head of house, Mr Hennessy, whom she has a strained relationship with. She is regularly thrown out of lessons for disruption, resulting in Mr Hennessy calling her Mum into school. In an effort to turn her behaviour around, Music teacher Mr Ritter encourages her to perform a solo as part of her coursework for Performing Arts, a subject she works well in. However, Katie has a major knock when her Grandmother passes away, putting her performance in jeopardy.
31	Episode 4	15 September 2015	1.91
Year 8 Czech student Linda is a bright girl but gets easily distracted and her boisterous behaviour regularly lands her into trouble. Because of this, she is in the bottom set for most subjects. Her head of house, Mr Sage, convinces her teachers to move her up to higher sets in order to challenge her academic ability. However, Linda suffers a major blow when her brother in year 9, Florian, is sent back to the Czech Republic for the rest of the year to live with his grandmother, because of his poor behaviour both at home and school. Mr Sage fights tooth and nail to ensure that Linda won't go down the same route. Fellow year 8s Corey and Gethin are good friends and both decide to apply to be captain of the school's rugby team. Both boys support each other and work hard to convince Mr Sage of their ability to be the rugby captain.
32	Episode 5	22 September 2015	1.61
Under the leadership of Mr Lo Celso, Willows' Maths Department has gone from strength to strength. But Mr Lo Celso is concerned about year 9 boy Kalid, who struggles with Maths and other subjects because of his poor attendance. Kalid has also had to move schools a lot in his life because his family regularly change locations. As a result, he has significant gaps in his education. Mr Lo Celso gives Kalid an incentive to come into school by asking for his help in setting up his morning assemblies and that if he does, he can become part of the school's radio show. Fellow Maths teacher Mr Hennessy also faces a battle in the classroom with likeable but lazy year 8 Benjy, who finds it hard to remember his times tables. Benjy is desperate to move up a set but his lack of effort makes this unlikely. Mr Hennessy gives Benjy extra support and encouragement to try to make it happen.
33	Episode 6	29 September 2015	1.50
Year 11 boyfriend and girlfriend Tyler and Georgia are approaching their final exams at Willows. Tyler is very strong academically and has already passed several of his GCSEs a year early. By contrast, Georgia struggles with her work and had previously been a well-known trouble-maker at school. In her mock Maths exam Georgia suffers a panic attack and has to withdraw. This culminates in her having a serious crisis of confidence, causing her behaviour to deteriorate and her work to suffer as a result. Tyler, Mrs Ballard and Georgia's head of house Miss Priday all work hard to get her back on track, which proves to be difficult when Georgia admits that she has been self-harming. Year 8 George is a loveable rogue and a popular pupil but lands himself into serious trouble when he accidentally breaks a window in Performing Arts. He is punished by being made to stay behind after school and help out with the pantomime. Whilst there he meets fellow year 8 Erin and the two start to become close.
34	Episode 7	6 October 2015	1.50
Shaun and Dan are best mates and are in year 11. However, their friendship is a fiery one and a fallout results in them both being places in separate classes because of threats of physical violence. Mrs Ballard gets both boys together in her office and makes them promise that there will be no more trouble. However, rumours from around the school result in Dan and Shaun having a fight in the canteen, shortly after Mrs Ballard had told Dan that he would be permanently excluded if he started a fight. Can Mr Cole, the head of the behavioural unit at Willows, convince Mrs Ballard to let him put Dan in the behaviour unit so he can still get some GCSE qualifications? Year 9 girl Emily spent a year at a school in Scotland and now has returned to Willows, but has become very disruptive in lessons upon her return. Emily's English teacher, Miss Charles, chats to Emily and she admits that she is suffering from insecurities.
35	Episode 8	13 October 2015	1.46
The well-being and attendance team at Willows think the school cabaret could provide an opportunity for Sean, who has cerebral palsy, to come out of his shell.

== Production ==
The follow-up to Educating the East End was announced by Channel 4 on 9 December 2014. Producers had looked to schools in Scotland, Northern Ireland and Wales for the new series before settling on Willows High School in Cardiff. Executive producer David Clews revealed "you can really feel the charm and character of the place as soon as you walk through the gates and start talking to the students". Joy Ballard initially declined TwoFour's invitation before changing her mind a month later. In preparation for the programme she took advice from Jonny Mitchell, head of Thornhill Community Academy in Educating Yorkshire. The first six weeks of production saw the documentary makers observing the school and "picking up stories". Filming began in October and lasted until Christmas.
