= Dafydd Benwyn =

Dafydd Benwyn was a 16th-century poet, from Glamorganshire, Wales. He is thought to have been possibly the most prolific of the bards of Glamorganshire, and two quite large collections of his awdlau and cywyddau are known to survive. They include a number of works written in praise of, and containing the genealogies of, some of the wealthiest families of Glamorganshire and Monmouthshire, and are quite important in this respect.
