= Educating Greater Manchester 2 =

Channel 4 television documentary

- Series 6
- No. of episodes: 4

Release
- Original network: Channel 4
- Original release: 3 November – 17 November 2020

Series chronology
- ← Previous; Series 5 Next → Series 7

Educating Greater Manchester 2 is the 6th series of the BAFTA award-winning British documentary television programme Educating broadcast on Channel 4. The documentary follows previous installments in the Educating... series including the BAFTA Award-winning Educating Essex (2011), Educating Yorkshire (2013), Educating the East End (2014), Educating Cardiff (2015) and Educating Greater Manchester (2017).

Channel 4 confirmed in January 2018 that the Educating programme was renewed for two further series. For the first time, the series would have returned to the same school for the sixth and seventh series, in Salford, after the fifth series was filmed at Harrop Fold School in Little Hulton, Salford. However, over the course of filming the sixth series, headmaster Drew Povey resigned as a result of the allegations of off-rolling students, forcing Harrop Fold School to be placed in special measures by Ofsted. Channel 4 later confirmed that these episodes would not be aired as a result of the findings. However, a condensed version of the episodes began airing from 3 November 2020. The episodes did not feature many of the series 5 cast after they refused to be seen on screen with Povey.

The episodes recorded the lowest rating of the educating series, leaving production bosses upset.

== Episodes ==
No. overall	Episode	Original release date	UK viewers (millions)
44	Episode 1	3 November 2020	2.50
The series about modern schooling and teen life returns for a new run to Harrop Fold School, where Year 7 Jacob discusses his struggles with dyslexia, Katelyn, now in Year 9 and diagnosed with ADHD, keeps bunking off, a citizen's tip-off sparks a school-wide search for a knife. Year 10 Vincent has come a long way since last year, which the school puts down to him making the most of his position on the student council. Harrop's black market in sweets is also seen.
45	Episode 2	4 November 2020	1.41
The campaign for a new head boy and head girl starts. One of the candidates is Holly, who has a giggle incontinence and wants to give something back to Harrop after all the help they have given her with her anxieties surrounding her medical condition. Five pupils are given therapy animals to look after throughout the school day. Year 10 Jack is given a final warning for making prank phone calls in school and the school welcomes Year 8 Aarshiya from India.
46	Episode 3	10 November 2020	1.94
The new head girl is revealed. Year 9 couple Faye and Kieran get interactive babies to look after. Rani plays a Valentine's prank on his friend Jack. Year 11's Chelci and Cheyenne have a falling out.
47	Episode 4	17 November 2020	1.39
The pressure is on as GCSE exams start for Year 11. New head girl Melody gets into hot water over her school uniform campaign, things blow up for Year 10 Morgan in Spanish, Year 11 Jenson is finding it difficult and stressful to cope with all of the up coming GCSEs and lack of revision time, and series draws to a close with a look at the allegations for which Mr Povey was suspended.

== Production ==
It was announced on 24 January 2018 that there would be a series 2 and series 3 of Educating Greater Manchester. In the wake of the off-rolling scandal and the investigation into the conduct of Drew Povey and Ross Povey, it was later announced these episodes would not be aired after the pair both resigned from their posts as the investigation continued. Following on from the resignation the school inspectors Ofsted deemed the school to be failing in their safeguarding duty due to the leadership of Drew Povey and the school was placed into special measures. The school was deemed safe after a new interim Headteacher took charge of the failing school.

Channel 4 decided to start airing the second series from 3 November 2020.
