= Educating Yorkshire 2 =

British education documentary

- Season 7
- No. of episodes: 8

Release
- Original network: Channel 4
- Original release: 31 August – 19 October 2025

Series chronology
- ← Previous; Series 6

Educating Yorkshire 2 is the seventh series of the British documentary television programme Educating broadcast on Channel 4. The documentary follows previous installments in the Educating... series including the BAFTA Award-winning Educating Essex (2011), Educating Yorkshire (2013), Educating the East End (2014), Educating Cardiff (2015), Educating Greater Manchester (2017) and Educating Greater Manchester 2 (2020).

The series returned to Thornhill Community Academy in Dewsbury, West Yorkshire for the 2024-25 academic year, ten years after the first series, and follows headteacher Mr Burton and his team of staff as they tackle the challenges faced in British secondary schools.

== Episodes ==
No. overall	Episode	Original release date	UK viewers (millions)
48	Episode 1	31 August 2025	TBD
49	Episode 2	7 September 2025	TBD
50	Episode 3	14 September 2025	TBD
51	Episode 4	21 September 2025	TBD
52	Episode 5	28 September 2025	TBD
53	Episode 6	5 October 2025	TBD
54	Episode 7	12 October 2025	TBD
55	Episode 8	19 October 2025	TBD

== Production ==
The follow-up to Educating Yorkshire was announced by Channel 4 on 19 July 2024 with the working title 'Educating Yorkshire 2025' with filming taking place in the 2024-25 academic year. Filming utilised a similar fixed rig set up of 65 cameras to the previous series to be as unobtrusive as possible.
