= Educating Greater Manchester =

Season of television series

- Series 5
- No. of episodes: 8

Release
- Original network: Channel 4
- Original release: 31 August – 19 October 2017

Series chronology
- ← Previous; Series 4 Next → Series 6

Educating Greater Manchester is the fifth series of the BAFTA award-winning British documentary television programme Educating broadcast on Channel 4. The eight-episode fifth series began broadcast from 31 August 2017. The documentary follows previous installments in the Educating... series including the BAFTA Award-winning Educating Essex (2011), Educating Yorkshire (2013), Educating the East End (2014) and Educating Cardiff (2015). The fifth series was filmed at Harrop Fold School in Little Hulton, Salford.

== Episodes ==
No. overall	Episode	Original release date	UK viewers (millions)
36	Episode 1	31 August 2017	2.76
The first episode focuses on two students who settled as refugees from Syria: Year 7 Rani and Year 10 Murad. Rani initially struggles to fit in due to his limited English, but he soon makes a firm friend in fellow Year 7 Jack, who guides him around the school, and invites him round his house for dinner. He initially attends lessons in a special needs class and is seen enjoying COGS lessons with Miss Emma Pearce and taking centre stage in Drama lessons with Deputy Headteacher Mr Gary Featherstone. Rani and Murad also attend a study group for students who speak English as an additional language. At the group, however, Polish student Estera offends Murad unintentionally after a miscommunication. Murad's Afghan friend, Girhan, physically threatens fellow Year 10 Robbie after he makes a remark likening him to Osama bin Laden. Robbie is reprimanded by languages teacher Mr Hamdaoui and headmaster Mr Drew Povey. Meanwhile, a group of boys reverse graffiti the back of a school van with obscene language and drawings, and the school has to deal with the repercussions of the Manchester Arena Bombing.
37	Episode 2	7 September 2017	2.73
This episode focuses on the work of the student development team, and three girls whom they regularly support. There are concerns about the attendance of Year 11 Mia, who is seven months pregnant and often missing lessons for midwife appointments. Another frequent visitor to the development team is Katelyn, a sensitive, bad-tempered Year 8 student prone to disruptive emotional outbursts. As she becomes increasingly volatile and begins refusing to attend her lessons, she is placed on report and supervised by head of Year 8 Mr Ince, with whom she is amicable. Year 11 Kodi, who is left grieving after her mother's death, refuses to attend lessons and tells Mr Povey she wants to quit school early, but he persuades her to reconsider and sit her GCSEs. The next day, Kodi reveals to Miss Kay that she is self-harming, and is given regular school counselling sessions. As Mia approaches her due date, Miss Kay gives her permission to not attend school until she has given birth.
38	Episode 3	14 September 2017	2.71
Mitchell, an effeminate, flamboyant Year 11, is one of the most challenging students in his year. He refuses to follow instructions in lessons, sometimes storming out of class, and staff confiscate his phone and alert the police when they discover he is posing as an adult on Tinder. As punishment for his poor behaviour, Mitchell, who enjoys acting, is denied a main role in the upcoming school production, much to his chagrin. Fellow Year 11 and rugby team member Callum also aspires to be an actor, but is initially reluctant to audition for the production in fear of being teased by his friends, until his girlfriend Maddie persuades him. While Mitchell is denied a main role as punishment for his poor behaviour, Callum and Maddie are both cast major roles. However, their relationship is tested when Maddie believes rumours circulating about Callum dating another girl, and they find it hard to rehearse together. Mitchell's behaviour still doesn't improve and with his exams getting closer, Mr Chambers calls in Mitchell's Mum and Grandma for a meeting in a final attempt to get Mitchell back on track.
39	Episode 4	21 September 2017	2.65
This episode meets the school's behaviour team. Mr Gary Chambers is close to losing his patience with misbehaving Year 8 Kayden who is regularly in trouble, even being suspected of smoking cannabis in the school toilets. Meanwhile, Mr Povey tries a left-field tactic with likeable but childish Year 9 Vincent: putting him on the Student Council. But when Vincent and Kayden's behaviour deteriorates, will their last chances be over?
40	Episode 5	28 September 2017	2.50
There's election fever as the search for Harrop Fold's first ever Head Girl and Head Boy begins. Pupils are put through their paces culminating in a presidential style debate led by Deputy Headteacher Mr Gary Featherstone in front of all their peers. At the last minute an unexpected candidate throws his hat into the ring.
41	Episode 6	5 October 2017	2.43
This episode focuses on social media in school, and the influence it has on the students. Lelo is a Zimbabwean Year 11 girl who previously attended a strict boarding school. Upon her arrival in the UK, she had grown particularly fond of social media, but Miss Michelle Kay is concerned of her irresponsible behaviour online. She sends a lewd picture of herself to a boy at another school online, causing conflict between her and her friend Serena, and catching the attention of Mr Drew Povey. Head of Year 7 Miss Julie Bland receives a phone call from the grandparents of Caprice, who has repeatedly taken her school lunch home due to her friends taking photographs of her eating and sharing them on Snapchat with demeaning captions. Miss Julie Bland gathers the culprits into her office, reprimands them and makes them apologise to Caprice. Meanwhile, Year 11 metalhead truant Tom, who has anxiety, finds it difficult to cope in a classroom environment, but enjoys rock music and drumming. In an attempt to motivate him, Mr Ross Povey suggests to Tom's music teacher Miss Alex Burgess that he could play drums with the staff band at the school talent show. She agrees to let him use the music room to practise on the condition that his attendance in music lessons improves. Tom's attendance does eventually improve, and, together with Mr Ross and Mr Ben Povey, plays Nirvana's "In Bloom".
42	Episode 7	12 October 2017	2.32
This episode meets the Year 7s and new young teacher Mr Humphreys, who faces a challenge with mischievous best friends Tiger and Billy. And can 11-year-old Jacob win his ex-girlfriend Lily back?
43	Episode 8	19 October 2017	2.19
There are tears and tantrums as the Year 11s have their mock exams. When the results aren't good, the school throw everything they have at improving results for the real GCSEs. Meanwhile, fed up of the constant fights between brothers Year 8 Sean and Year 10 Warren, Mr Drew Povey suggests Sean attend the school boxing club as an outlet for his anger.

== Production ==
After the fourth series of the Educating... series ended, it was announced that the series would be shelved till 2017 to give the show a break and a rest. It was announced on 18 May 2016 by Channel 4 that the Educating series would be returning in 2017 with a fifth series after a 2-year break. The series will again be filmed using fly on the wall cameras and will film the lives of teachers and students. The fifth series will be filmed in Salford, Greater Manchester. Filming for the fifth series began in September 2016 and finished in August 2017 at the end of the school year, the series premiered on Channel 4 from 31 August 2017.
