= Mark Grist =

British poet/rapper

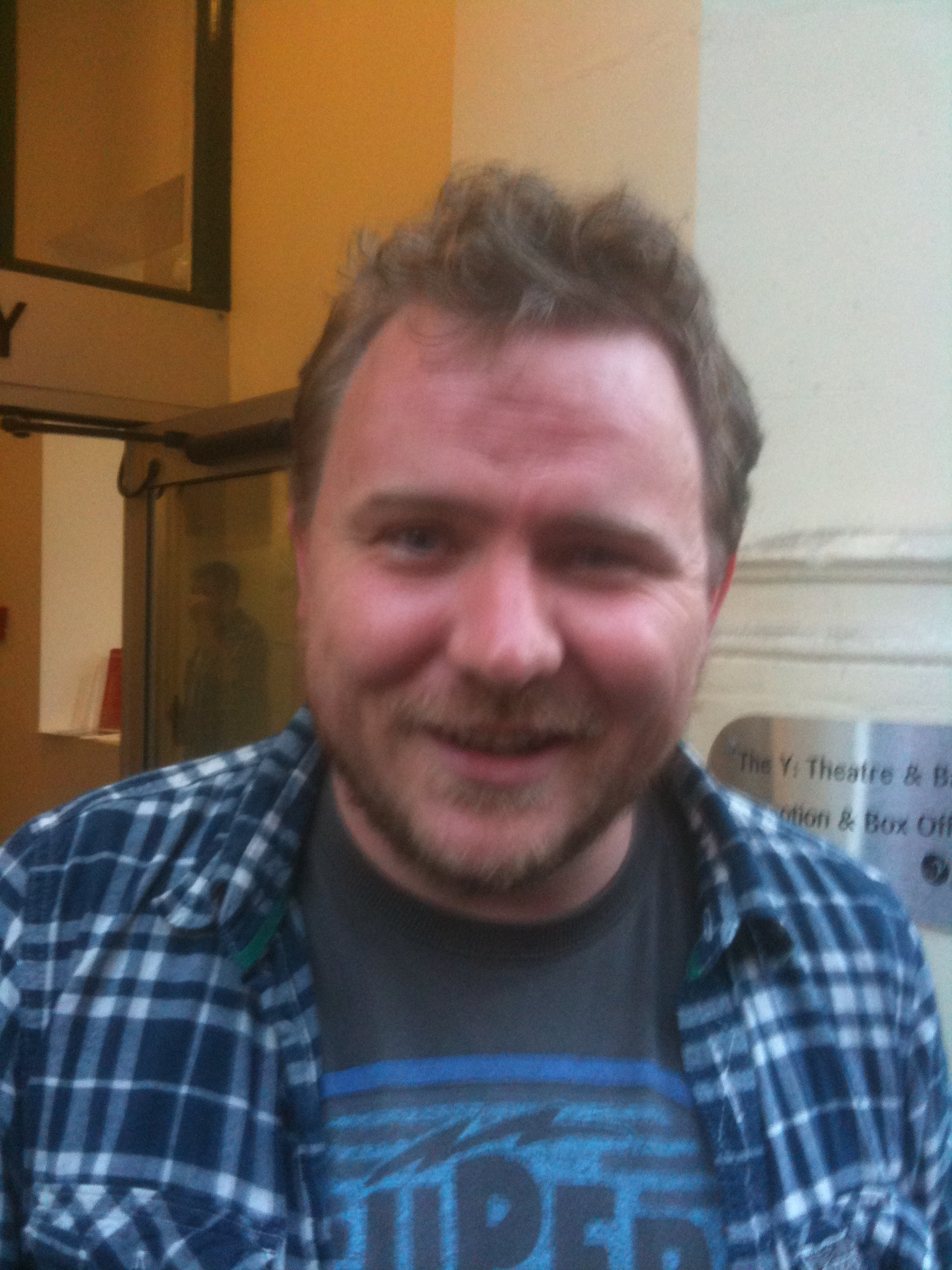
- Poet and battle rapper
- Occupations: Teacher, poet, battle rapper, TV presenter
- Writing career
- Genres: Poetry, Spoken word, battle rap, Storytelling,
- Website: markgrist.com

Mark Grist is a poet and battle rapper based in Peterborough, United Kingdom, who rose to prominence when his Don't Flop rap battle against Mancunian MC Blizzard became an internet sensation. The video of the rap battle became the most viewed UK rap battle of all time and Grist is ranked the third most viewed rap battler in UK history.

His poem Girls Who Read produced by Roundhouse London and published on their YouTube channel has also gained significant fame on the internet, winning two International Luvvie Awards for 'Best individual performance' and 'Best Viral Video'.

Grist starred in Channel 4's 'Mr Drew's School for Boys', Redbull TV's 'Mark Grist Battles the World' and his poetry and rap battle videos have gained over 60 million views online.

Grist has visited several schools to perform his poetry and raps on several occasions. He has published a collection of his poetry with Burning Eye books.

In September 2024, Grist visited multiple International schools in Hong Kong to tell his story of going from an English teacher to a rapper.

== History ==
Grist performed in various musicals and productions whilst at school, including many performances with the Bristol Youth Theatre (he later went on to co-direct the company). He studied American and English literature at the University of East Anglia before becoming an English teacher. He noticed that his students felt disconnected from the English curriculum and decided to start working with his students, learning about rap. Following a bet with his students, Grist entered rap battle tournament 'The East of England King of the Mic' held in a Peterborough nightclub, eventually making it through the grand final of the tournament, which he lost to fellow Peterborough MC Mixy (Michael Riccardi). Grist began using rap techniques to teach his students about poetic devices and other elements of the English language, inspiring them to take a stronger interest in the subject.

Grist left teaching in 2008 and with MC Mixy formed Dead Poets, a double act that fused spoken-word poetry with hip-hop, touring the United Kingdom and performing at the Edinburgh Festival in 2010. After deciding to try out rapping in the Don't Flop battle league, Grist's battle against MC Blizzard received coverage in the British media, gathering over 5 million internet views in the process and becoming the UK's most viewed rap battle of all time.

Grist performed at the Edinburgh Festival again in 2012, receiving positive reviews from The Guardian, the Scotsman and other publications. His storytelling skills and passion for his subject often being cited as his strengths, alongside a complex grasp of rhyme and writing techniques.

Grist has written poetry along with collaborator Larsen for their YouTube channel Grist & Larsen, garnering millions of views amongst the poetry scene. Grist's rhymes are inspired by an eclectic range of themes, and are usually upbeat, covering themes of identity, creativity, freedom of expression and colloquial aspects of modern life.

=== Battle Rap Record (Individual) ===
5 Wins, 2 Defeats
Res.	Record	Opponent	Date	Host League	Notes
Promo	-	Loonie	2016-10-29	FlipTop Battle League	
Win	5–2	Knamelis	2014-01-04	Don't Flop	
Win	4–2	Spirited Sage	2013-09-08	Rap Slam Battles	
Promo	3-2	Stuart Parsons	2013-02-15	None	
Win	3–2	Aukes	2013-01-24	Don't Flop	
Loss	2–2	Deffinition	2013-01-05	Don't Flop	
Promo	2-1	Soul	2012-10-10	Don't Flop	
Promo	2-1	Micky Worthless	2012-07-22	Don't Flop	
Promo	2-1	Mixy	2012-05-27	None	
Loss	2–1	Zain Azrai	2012-02-24	Don't Flop	
Win	2–0	Blizzard	2011-12-29	Don't Flop	
Win	1–0	Mos Prob	2011-05-05	Don't Flop	
Promo	-	Omen	2010-05-17	None	Debut
