= Joseph Eastham High School =

Former comprehensive school in Salford, England

Joseph Eastham School badge, 1961

Joseph Eastham High School was a comprehensive school in Salford, England, built at the end of the 1950s by Lancashire County Council, and following reorganisation arising from the Local Government Act 1972, came under the auspices of Salford City Council. The school served the areas of Little Hulton, Walkden, Worsley and Boothstown, and was named after a well-respected Little Hulton grocer who lived on Hilton Lane where the school was sited, and had a shop on Smithfold Lane. Joseph Eastham was also a Councillor and Alderman who had a keen interest in educational provision and invested in local billiard halls and youth clubs.

The school hall, circa 1990

The original school buildings were designed by St. Annes architect Tom Mellor as a 450 place secondary modern. The first headteacher was Eric Livesey – "I arrived in 1960 but it wasn't opened until 1961, it was an absolute mess, unfinished chaos. There were workmen and plaster everywhere." The building was enlarged in 1965 to accommodate 720, with further alterations in 1980 and 1990 to cater for 900 pupils, and finally in 1997 to provide for over a thousand pupils.

Local councillor and Little Hulton grocer, Joseph Eastham

The school also grew in reputation and became affectionately known as "Joey's". The maroon and blue striped school tie was the mainstay of school uniform. Plain grey pullovers or cardigans, black for fifth years, gave way in the 1990s to maroon jumpers displaying an embroidered school stag. The Joseph Eastham badge was created by the school's first art teacher who 'borrowed' the tongue-pulling stag's head from the crest of local nobleman, Lord Hulton, "Issuant out of a ducal coronet a hart's head and neck argent" and added a Lancashire rose "between two branches of hawthorn proper".

The school tie. More blue stripes were added in the 1990s

The school operated a five form entry with pupils joining one of four houses Edinburgh, Cornwall, York and Kent, later changed to three houses, Tudor, Stuart and Windsor. – When the school grew to eight form entry in the 1990s, a fifth house, Lancaster, was added. The school had extensive playing fields, and its Soccer, Hockey, Rugby, Rounders, Volleyball, Cricket, Netball and Athletics teams established an enviable reputation in Salford leagues and competitions, many Joseph Eastham pupils representing Salford at national level. The annual Sports Day enabled the Houses to compete against each other watched by cheering crowds freed from lessons for the occasion.

The school had a tradition of educational visits and holidays, most notably long-standing activity holidays at Westward Ho! in Devon, Lyme Regis in Dorset, Barry Island in South Wales, the Isle of Wight, water sports holidays in Spain and France, visits to Italy and Austria, trips to Disneyland Paris, and camping in the Lake District. The 1970s and 1980s also saw a rise in the number of after school and lunchtime clubs being offered including: Art, Brass Band, Chess, Choir, Christian Union, Cross Country Running, Drama, Gardening, Gymnastics, Philately, Railway Modelling, Steel Band, and Trampolining.

Eric Livesey retired in 1982 and his deputy Kevin Comrie, who had joined the school in 1978, was appointed headteacher.

The school's three Headteachers – Eric Livesey, Kevin Comrie and Tony Walsh

The school fostered an enduring tradition of school plays, particularly musicals, including: The Last Reckoning (1976), Toad of Toad Hall (1977), The Wizard of Oz (1981), Oh, What a Lovely War (1981), Oliver (1983 and 1997), Our Day Out (1992 and 2001), Smithy (1993), Grease (1994), Blood Brothers (1995), Little Shop of Horrors (1998), and West Side Story (1999).

Ex-Head Boy Christopher Eccleston in school for a Drama workshop, 1999

Profile was the slightly anarchic school magazine, a mix of humorous and serious content edited by older pupils, which gently poked fun at the teachers from 1977 to 1997 and won the TV Times Press Gang competition in 1989 earning the school a state-of-the-art Amiga 2000 computer. From 1995 to 2000, the school also published NewsLink for parents of pupils at the school.

The school's Art Department displayed work at nearby St. Ann's Hospice and in spare window space at Walkden Tesco (and the Scan supermarket that preceded it) who in return provided bags for the distribution of the Harvest Festival foods which pupils collected each year and distributed to the elderly of Little Hulton and Walkden, many of whom were also invited into school at Christmastime for a festive dinner and to be entertained by pupils. The Joseph Eastham Steel Band, in addition to performing regularly in school, performed at St. Ann's Hospice and Ellesmere Shopping Centre, and also represented Salford at the Northwest Schools' Prom held at Manchester's Bridgewater Hall in 1999.

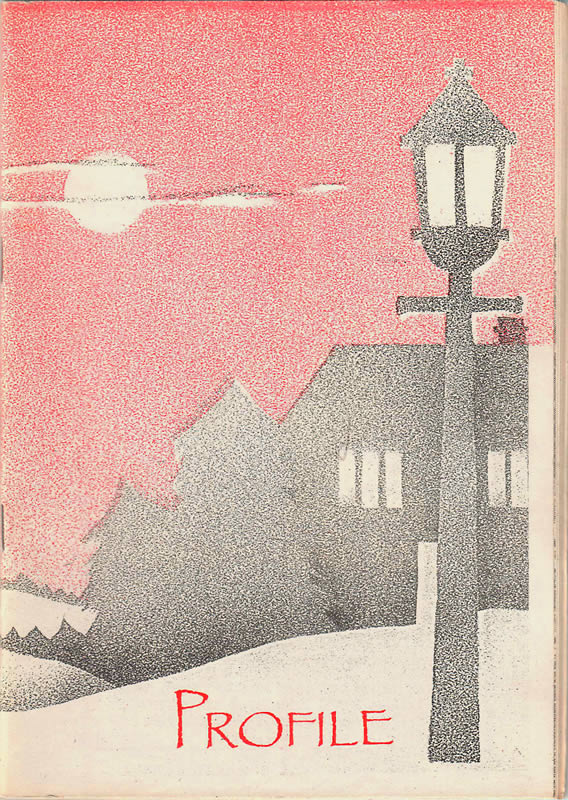
Cover of Christmas Profile 1987 designed by Wai-Tsau Wong

The Carol Concert was a regular event, often with feeder primary schools providing an audience. Year group Christmas parties and discos were also regular features of Christmas at Joeys and other common events included Talent Shows and hugely popular Staff Pantomimes. Each year Joseph Eastham pupils collected money for a Christmas Charity, including the British Heart Foundation, a 'Pennies for Peru' appeal in support of a school for poor children in Lima, and raising enough money to buy and train a guide dog, a golden labrador that later visited the school with its owner. 'Rags to Riches' fancy dress and non-uniform days also became a regular focus of fun as well as charitable donation. Fundraising events organised by the school's Parent Teachers' Association included evening socials, fashion shows, and for many years a Summer Fete or Fayre was held in June on the school playing fields.

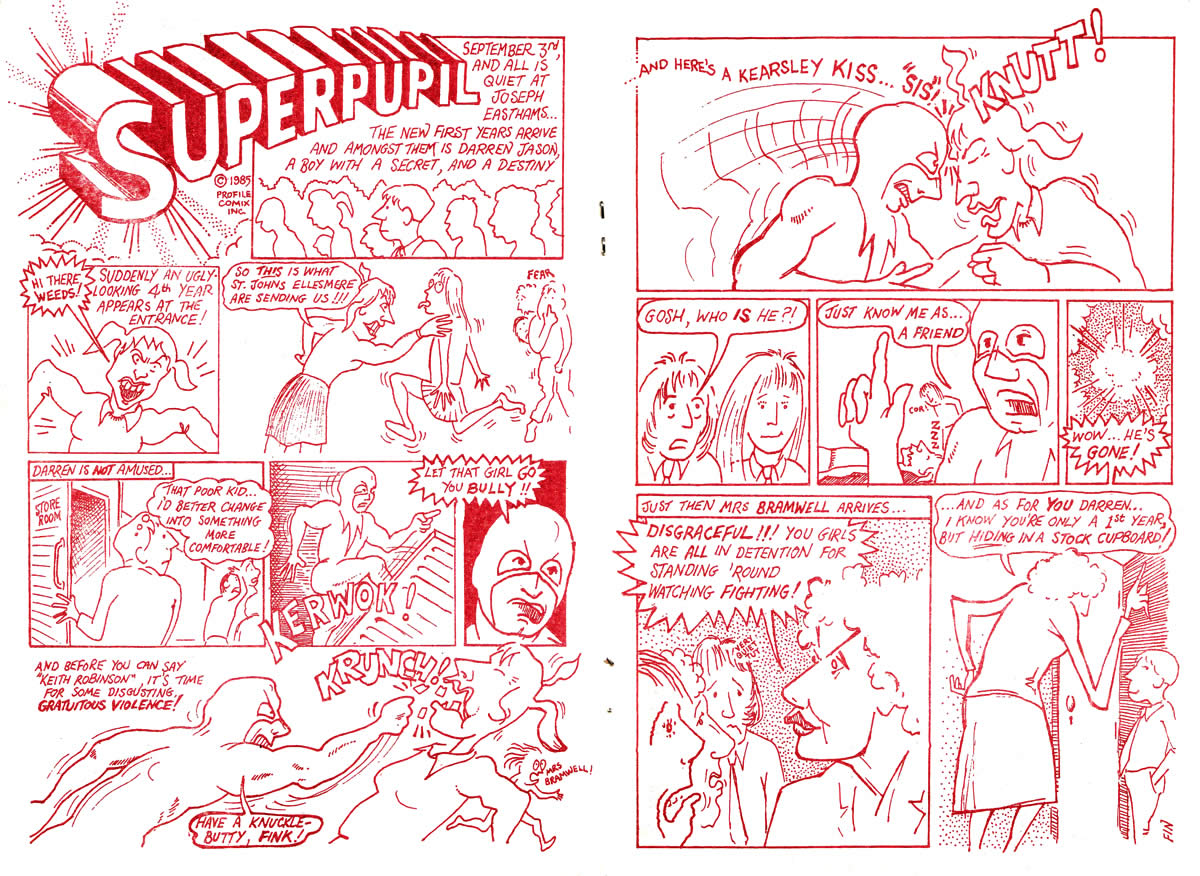
Superpupil – comic strip from Profile, Summer 1985

From the early 1980s, the Fifth Year Common Room provided a semi-informal base for senior pupils to assemble in the morning, socialise at break and lunchtime, and store personal possessions in lockers. Funds for equipment were initially raised by a sponsored walk the length of the nearby M602 motorway a month before its official opening in 1982. Table tennis, pool and chess were enthusiastically undertaken every lunchtime, annual trophies were awarded to tournament champions, with the conkers competition usually attracting the largest participation.

Joseph Eastham enjoyed considerable examination success, regarded by one Salford schools adviser as the best in the city when contextual value added factors were taken into consideration. Throughout the 1980s and well into the 1990s, the school's Attendance figures rivalled those of schools in more affluent areas of the city. In addition to operating a conventional prefect system where older pupils supervised areas at break and lunchtimes, the school also instigated an 'Adopt a Zone' initiative in which every form looked after an area of the school building, keeping corridors tidy and safe and ensuring that plants were watered and display boards undamaged.

At this time schools were becoming much more accountable to the Department for Education with all the additional paperwork that entailed. Ofsted was formed in 1992 and Joseph Eastham, one of the first 300 schools inspected, received an extremely favourable report with the chief inspector praising the school's pastoral system as 'second to none'. Kevin Comrie took early retirement at Christmas 1993 and commented in an interview with Profile, "the job has changed so much and has become so much more taxing". The governors appointed Tony Walsh as headteacher from January 1994.

The fabric of the school building was beginning to show its age in the 1990s. Leaking roofs required countless buckets and expensive maintenance, and some serious flooding not only yielded an impromptu holiday on health and safety grounds, but quite possibly fuelled calls for a new school building funded by a public-private partnership. The school had suffered a string of thefts and burglaries in the late 1980s and 1990s, and in response an ugly but effective security fence was erected around the school grounds in 1997.

Joey's had long been at the forefront of Information Technology provision in Salford and was an early adopter of Apple Macintosh computers. By the end of the decade the school boasted four networked computer suites with over a hundred Apple and PC machines networked throughout the school. Joseph Eastham was greatly extended in 1997 and received a new Drama Studio, an additional Science Laboratory and a block of 10 new Maths, English and Modern Languages rooms. Despite such huge recent investment, in June 2000 Salford proposed the merger of Joseph Eastham and nearby Little Hulton Community School in order to "reduce surplus school places in Salford by between seven and 10 per cent" and save money.

Although subsequent consultation confirmed that the proposed merger was unpopular among staff and pupils at both schools, and with parents, the LEA confirmed that the amalgamation would take place regardless. Joseph Eastham High School closed in summer 2001 and Harrop Fold High School was established in September 2001. The Joey's site housed the new school's younger pupils until a new building on the Hilton Lane playing fields was completed. The former Joseph Eastham High School buildings were demolished in the summer of 2008.

== Notable former pupils ==
- Christopher Eccleston, actor (was Head Boy at the school)
- Luke Marshall,
- Neil Eckersley, judo coach and bronze medallist 1984 Los Angeles Olympics
- David Mercer, weightlifter, bronze medallist 1984 Los Angeles Olympics

== Bibliography ==
Joseph Eastham High School Prospectus, 1990–91
Joseph Eastham High School Prospectus, 2000–01
