= Christopher Eccleston =

English actor (born 1964)

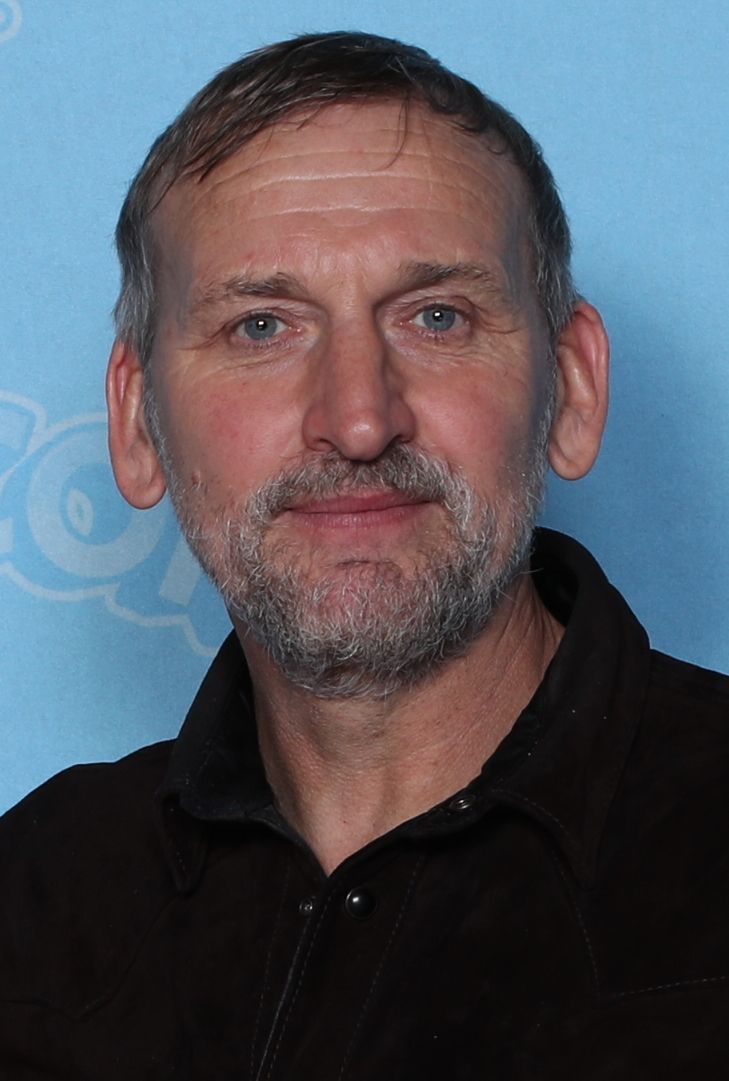
- Eccleston in 2019
- Born: 16 February 1964 (age 62); Salford, Lancashire, England
- Education: Salford Tech; Royal Central School of Speech and Drama
- Occupation: Actor
- Years active: 1989–present
- Spouse: Mischka Eccleston (m. 2011; div. 2015)
- Children: 2

Christopher Eccleston (/ˈɛk.əl.stən/; born 16 February 1964) is an English actor. He is known for his work in various social realist television dramas, as well as for playing the ninth incarnation of the Doctor in the BBC science fiction series Doctor Who (2005).

Born in Salford, Eccleston first rose to prominence for his portrayal of Derek Bentley in the biographical film Let Him Have It (1991), and gained widespread recognition in the UK for his television roles in Cracker (1993–1994) and Our Friends in the North (1996), the latter earning him a nomination for the British Academy Television Award for Best Actor. He received a second nomination for the drama serial The Second Coming (2003) and an International Emmy Award for Best Actor for his performance in the anthology series Accused (2010).

Eccleston earned two consecutive nominations for Best Supporting Actor in a Drama Series at the Critics' Choice Television Awards for his role as Matt Jamison in the HBO series The Leftovers (2014–2017). He also portrayed Maurice Scott in the drama series The A Word (2016–2020) and Fagin in the family series Dodger (2022–present). Since 2021, Eccleston has reprised his Doctor Who role in licensed audio dramas produced by Big Finish Productions.

Eccleston appeared in the British films Shallow Grave (1994), Jude (1996), 24 Hour Party People, 28 Days Later (both 2002) and Legend (2015), as well as the Hollywood blockbusters Gone in 60 Seconds (2000), G.I. Joe: The Rise of Cobra (2009) and Thor: The Dark World (2013). On stage, he has played the title roles in Shakespeare's Hamlet (2002) and Macbeth (2018), and appeared in productions of Strindberg's Miss Julie (2000), Ibsen's A Doll's House (2009) and the Greek tragedy Antigone (2012).

== Early life and education ==
Christopher Eccleston was born on 16 February 1964 into a working-class family in Langworthy, Salford, then part of Lancashire. His identical twin brothers, Alan and Keith, were born eight years earlier. His father Ronnie Eccleston was a forklift truck driver and later a foreman, and his mother Elsie worked as a cleaner at a launderette. The family moved to a council estate in Little Hulton when Eccleston was seven months old. He attended Bridgewater County Primary School, then Joseph Eastham High School, where he became head boy.

Eccleston left school in 1979 to resit O-Levels at Eccles Sixth Form College. The school's drama teacher invited him to perform in a production of Lock Up Your Daughters, which inspired him to become an actor. Eccleston spent the next six months working in a warehouse, before completing a two-year Performance Foundation Course at Salford Tech, and going on to train at the Central School of Speech and Drama from 1983 to 1986. Whilst studying there he worked as an usher at the National Theatre.

Eccleston was influenced in his early years by kitchen sink drama films such as Saturday Night and Sunday Morning (1960) and Kes (1969), and social realist television dramas such as Boys from the Blackstuff (1982) and Play for Today: The Spongers (1978). Albert Finney (another actor from Salford) was a major inspiration to Eccleston. (Note: Attributed to multiple sources)

== Career ==
=== Early work (1988–1991) ===
Eccleston struggled to find acting work for three years after graduating from college, and he took a variety of odd jobs: at a supermarket, on building sites, and as an artist's nude life model at Slade School of Art. He stated in 2015: "I'd had very good roles in my final year [at college] but agents looked the other way. I wasn't delivering, and knew it. In every profession you have to believe in yourself. I was an odd mix of dedication and lack of confidence. I sabotaged myself." In 1989, he joined the stage crew of the Royal Exchange Theatre, Manchester. He was offered a job doing theatre-in-education for a team which needed a driver, but because he couldn't drive, he received half-wages (£70 a week) plus an Equity card. As soon as Eccleston was a member of Equity, theatre director Phyllida Lloyd, who had seen him at Central, offered him the part of Pablo Gonzalez in the Bristol Old Vic's April–May 1989 production of A Streetcar Named Desire. This was his professional stage debut. His first on-screen role was in the 1990 BBC television serial Blood Rights.

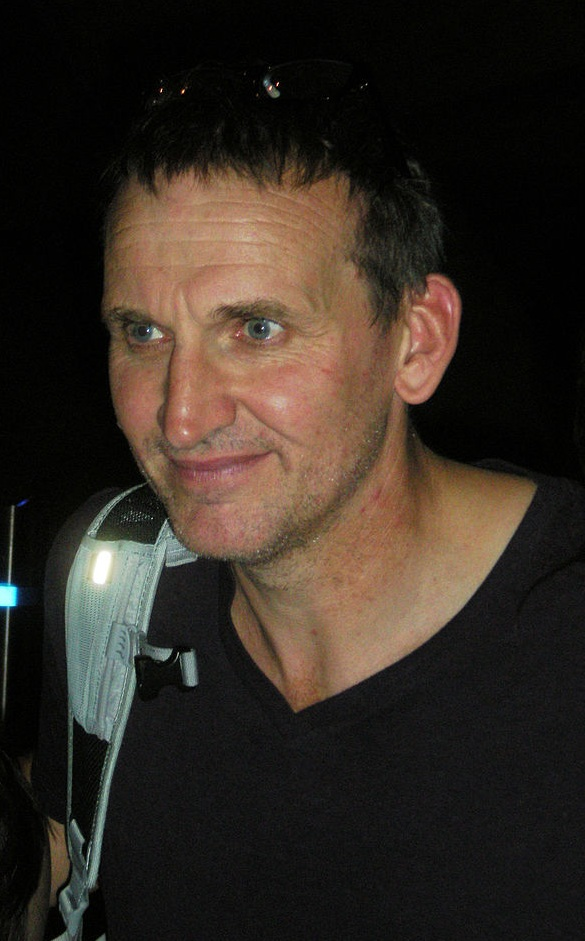
Eccleston in May 2012

=== Breakout (1991–1996) ===
Eccleston's breakout role was as teenage convict Derek Bentley in the 1991 biographical drama film Let Him Have It, his film debut. He had a guest appearance in the 1991 Inspector Morse episode "Second Time Around". The following year, he portrayed Sean Maddox in the BBC miniseries Friday on My Mind, and appeared in the Poirot episode "One, Two, Buckle My Shoe". Despite an initial desire to be a theatre actor, Eccleston subsequently "became a film and television actor by default". He received widespread recognition in the UK for his regular role as DCI Bilborough in the crime drama Cracker (1993–94). When Eccleston decided to quit the series, he asked writer Jimmy McGovern to give Bilborough a memorable and violent death scene.

In Danny Boyle's debut film Shallow Grave (1994), Eccleston co-starred alongside Ewan McGregor and Kerry Fox as a trio of friends who steal money from their dead flatmate. He was considered for the role of Francis Begbie in Boyle's 1996 film Trainspotting. Eccleston became involved with the BBC Two television drama Our Friends in the North (1996), which Boyle was originally set to direct. He was initially offered the part of Geordie Peacock (ultimately played by Daniel Craig), but Eccleston instead chose to take the part of left-wing activist Nicky Hutchinson. The broadcast of the award-winning television serial made the ensemble cast—which featured Eccleston, Craig, Mark Strong and Gina McKee—household names in the UK. For his performance, Eccleston was nominated for the 1997 British Academy Television Award for Best Actor, and won Best Actor at the 1997 Broadcasting Press Guild Awards.

Following a role in McGovern's television series Hearts and Minds (1995), Eccleston starred in McGovern's 1996 television film Hillsborough, portraying Trevor Hicks, who lost his two daughters in the 1989 Hillsborough disaster. Eccleston reflected in 2010 that "Hillsborough is the most important piece of work I've ever done and ever will do". He met with Hicks to discuss the project, and the two men remained close; when Hicks remarried in 2009, Eccleston was his best man. (Note: Attributed to multiple sources)

=== Established actor (1996–2004) ===
Eccleston subsequently appeared in a wide variety of British and American films. He played the title role in Michael Winterbottom's period drama Jude (1996), based on Thomas Hardy's book Jude the Obscure. He played Thomas Howard, 4th Duke of Norfolk, in Shekhar Kapur's historical film Elizabeth (1998). The same year, he played a Hasidic Jew in the drama A Price Above Rubies. Eccleston turned down a role in Saving Private Ryan and unsuccessfully auditioned for The Thin Red Line, both 1998 war films. He also turned down a role in Billy Elliot (2000), believing it to be an "offensive" depiction of northern English life. After a small part in David Cronenberg's science fiction horror film eXistenZ (1999), he made his Hollywood debut in the action heist film Gone in 60 Seconds (2000). It was a "good experience", but he criticised the film and his performance as "terrible". In 2001, he played the husband to Nicole Kidman's character in the horror film The Others and starred in the drama film The Invisible Circus. In 2002, Eccleston appeared in Winterbottom's 24 Hour Party People and collaborated again with Danny Boyle on the post-apocalyptic film 28 Days Later. He took the lead role in Revengers Tragedy (2002), adapted from Thomas Middleton's play The Revenger's Tragedy.

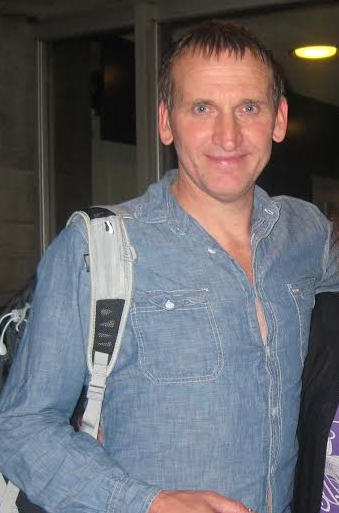
Eccleston in 2012

Eccleston viewed his involvement in Hollywood cinema as "a strategic move", stating "the money allowed me to come back and do some really interesting British television", such as Clocking Off (2000) and Linda Green (2001). He played Ben Jago (Iago) in the ITV television film Othello (2001), an adaptation of Shakespeare's play performed in modern English and set in a contemporary police force. He appeared in Strumpet (2001), a television film directed by Danny Boyle. For his role in Flesh and Blood (2002), he won Best Actor at the 2003 Royal Television Society Programme Awards. He had a small part in the comedy series The League of Gentlemen (2002). Eccleston portrayed Stephen Baxter, a Mancunian everyman who learns he is the son of God, in the ITV television drama serial The Second Coming (2003) written by Russell T Davies. For the role, he was again nominated for the BAFTA TV Award for Best Actor.

In 2000, Eccleston starred with Aisling O'Sullivan in a London production of August Strindberg's play Miss Julie. Writing for Variety, Matt Wolf praised Eccleston as "a real presence on stage", which illustrated "Strindberg’s savage, wounded psyche". Eccleston played the lead role in Hamlet at the West Yorkshire Playhouse in 2002. Charles Spencer of The Daily Telegraph praised the "dangerous edge of unpredictability" Eccleston brought to the stage but criticised his Hamlet for lacking "a spiritual dimension". In April 2004, Eccleston returned to the venue to appear in Murray Gold's play Electricity. On his rare stage appearances (from 1989 to 2016, Eccleston had less than a dozen theatre credits), he stated "I'm not seen as a theatre actor, which is what I trained for, so don’t get offered the parts".

In 2005, The Guardian wrote that Eccleston had "cornered the market in troubled masculinity" with his "career in damaged males". Eccleston stated in 2011 that "in the past I was attracted to angry roles. After all, anger is about grabbing attention and you want to do a lot of that as a young actor." In 2022, he stated "in my pursuit of the Oscar and BAFTAs and all that, I thought what I had to be was serious. And I took myself far, far too seriously. I thought that great acting was straight acting."

=== Doctor Who (2005) ===
In March 2004, it was announced that Eccleston was to play the ninth incarnation of the Doctor in the upcoming revival of the BBC science fiction series Doctor Who. He had emailed Davies, the series' lead writer, in late 2003 to express interest in auditioning for the role. Eccleston's casting was unexpected considering his association with gritty northern dramas, and lent credibility to a series considered light entertainment. He cited the quality of the scripts as a reason for joining the cast, stating in a BBC Breakfast interview that he was "excited" about working with Davies. In contrast to his predecessors who typically spoke with an RP accent, Eccleston used his natural Northern accent in the role. His aim was to challenge the correlation between the Doctor's intellect and his accent. He was the first actor born after the series' debut in 1963 to star in the lead role.

Doctor Who filming began in July 2004. By January 2005 he had decided to leave the series, and had arranged with the BBC to make a joint statement in future. Doctor Who's first series debuted on 26 March 2005. On 30 March, in a response to press questions, the BBC stated that Eccleston was leaving the role due to the series' gruelling schedule and to avoid becoming typecast. On 4 April, producer Jane Tranter publicly apologised to Eccleston on behalf of the BBC, admitting that the statement was falsely attributed and released without his consent. Following his departure, Eccleston was succeeded by David Tennant as the Tenth Doctor.

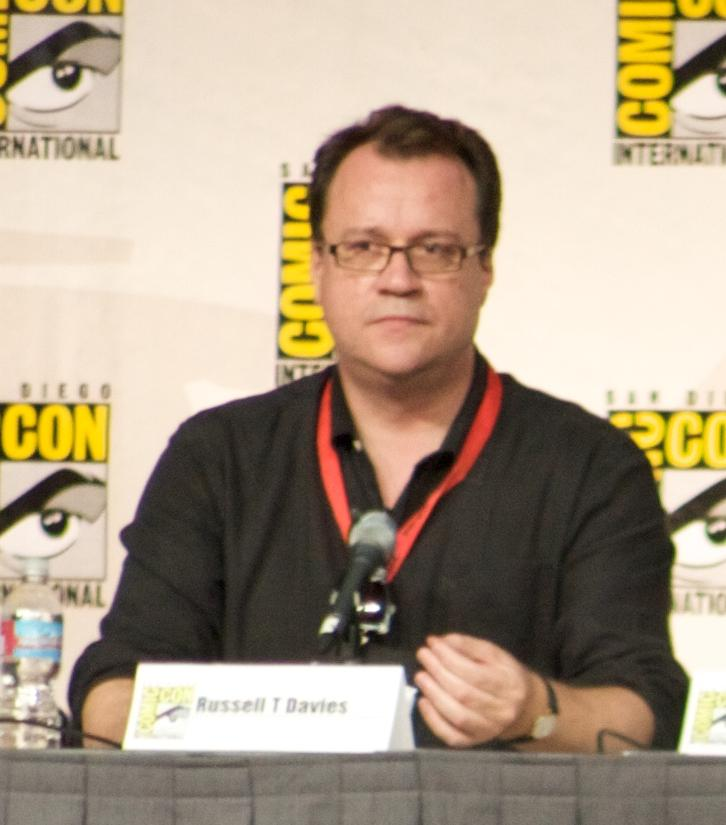
The breakdown of Eccleston's professional relationship with Doctor Who showrunner Russell T Davies contributed to his decision to leave the lead role after one series.

Eccleston's performance as the Doctor was widely praised for its realism, humanity and emotional depth, as well as for his chemistry with co-star Billie Piper. He was nominated for a Broadcasting Press Guild Award and a BAFTA Cymru Award for Best Actor. He also won Most Popular Actor at the 2005 National Television Awards. In a 2006 Doctor Who Magazine poll, Eccleston's portrayal of the Doctor was voted the third best behind Tom Baker and David Tennant. In April 2011, IGN opined that Eccleston's "tough-as-nails Doctor damaged by war and guilt" still possesses "the same spark of fun and adventure as his previous selves" and credited Eccleston for introducing a new generation to Doctor Who. Gavin Fuller of The Daily Telegraph noted that, as a primarily dramatic actor, Eccleston's "attempts at a lighter style could seem a tad forced", though this was "offset by his showdowns against the Daleks". A 2012 poll conducted by Entertainment Weekly voted Eccleston as the fourth most popular Doctor.

In the years since leaving the role, Eccleston has elaborated on his experience filming the series. He criticised the environment and culture that the cast and crew worked in (Note: Attributed to multiple sources) and said that staying in the role would require him to "blind [himself] to certain things that [he] thought were wrong". In 2011 he stated "it’s easy to find a job when you've got no morals, you've got nothing to be compromised, you can go, 'Yeah, yeah. That doesn’t matter. That director can bully that prop man and I won't say anything about it'." His professional relationship with showrunner Russell T Davies, producer Julie Gardner and co-producer Phil Collinson "broke down" during the first block of filming and never recovered. He also felt out of his comfort zone as he was "not a natural light comedian", and had stated in 2005 that Doctor Who was "a massive risk for [him]" because he was not known for "charm or comedy". Eccleston criticised the BBC's falsely attributed statement as being damaging to his career, and claimed he was subsequently blacklisted by the BBC, forcing him to take part in more American productions whilst waiting for "regime change". Eccleston has maintained that he is proud of Doctor Who and stated in 2015: "I hope I'll be remembered as one of the Doctors. I have no ill feeling towards the character or the series".

==== Later involvement ====
After discussions with executive producer Steven Moffat, Eccleston declined to return for the series' 50th anniversary special, "The Day of the Doctor" (2013), as he did not feel the script "did justice to the Ninth Doctor". As a result, John Hurt was cast as the War Doctor to fill the Ninth Doctor's role.

In July 2018, Eccleston began appearing as a guest at Doctor Who conventions for the first time. He had previously expressed his reluctance to appear at conventions, saying in 2017 that he preferred to "just earn [his] living by acting". In 2019 he said that his experience of meeting fans at conventions "healed something in [him]" and made him re-evaluate his relationship to the series.

On 9 August 2020, it was announced that Eccleston would reprise his role as the Ninth Doctor in licensed audio dramas for Big Finish Productions, across four boxsets beginning with a release in May 2021. This was the first time he had portrayed the character in 16 years. Eccleston was later confirmed to appear in further boxsets releasing in 2022 and 2023, as well as the audio series Once and Future. On his decision to return to the role, Eccleston stated that "the deciding factor—it might not be fashionable to say it—is that it's paid work, particularly in a pandemic. After that it was the quality of the writing". When asked in 2023 what it would take for him to return to the character on television, Eccleston replied, "sack Russell T Davies, sack Jane Tranter, sack Phil Collinson, sack Julie Gardner and I'll come back."

=== Other work (2005–2010) ===
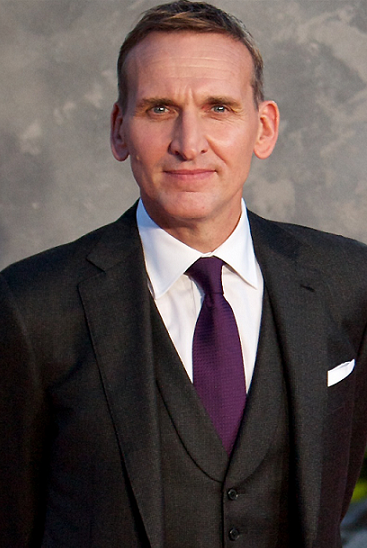
Eccleston at the premiere of Thor: The Dark World in 2013

On 30 October 2005, Eccleston appeared in the one-night play Night Sky alongside Navin Chowdhry, Bruno Langley, Ewen Bremner, David Warner, Saffron Burrows and David Baddiel. In December, he travelled to Indonesia's Aceh province for the BBC Breakfast news programme, examining how survivors of the 2004 Boxing Day tsunami were rebuilding their lives.

Eccleston's first post-Doctor Who television role was in Perfect Parents, a 2006 ITV drama film written and directed by Joe Ahearne, who had also directed him in Doctor Who. In 2007, he joined the cast of the American series Heroes as Claude, a man with the power of invisibility. Eccleston appeared as the Rider in the fantasy film The Seeker (2007), an adaptation of Susan Cooper's novel The Dark Is Rising. He was on the judging panel, along with Nick Broomfield and Archie Panjabi, for the BBC Four World Cinema Awards in 2008. Eccleston parodied his Doctor Who role by appearing in a 2008 episode of the sitcom The Sarah Silverman Program as a science fiction hero called Dr Lazer Rage.

Eccleston played villain Destro in the 2009 science fiction action film G.I. Joe: The Rise of Cobra. In 2018 he described his experience on the film as "horrendous". He did not appear in the 2013 sequel. Eccleston played Kelman in a 2009 stage production of Henrik Ibsen's A Doll's House at the Donmar Warehouse. Critic Henry Hitchings wrote in the Evening Standard that Eccleston was "miscast, [though he] exudes virile menace".

Eccleston played musician John Lennon in the 2010 BBC television film Lennon Naked, alongside Naoko Mori as Yoko Ono and Andrew Scott as Paul McCartney. The same year, Eccleston starred opposite Panjabi in a short film called The Happiness Salesman. In November 2010, he starred in the episode "Willy's Story" of Jimmy McGovern's BBC One anthology drama Accused, for which he won an International Emmy Award. In May 2011, he starred as Joseph Bede in The Shadow Line, a seven-part television drama serial for BBC Two.

=== The Leftovers, The A Word (2011–2020) ===
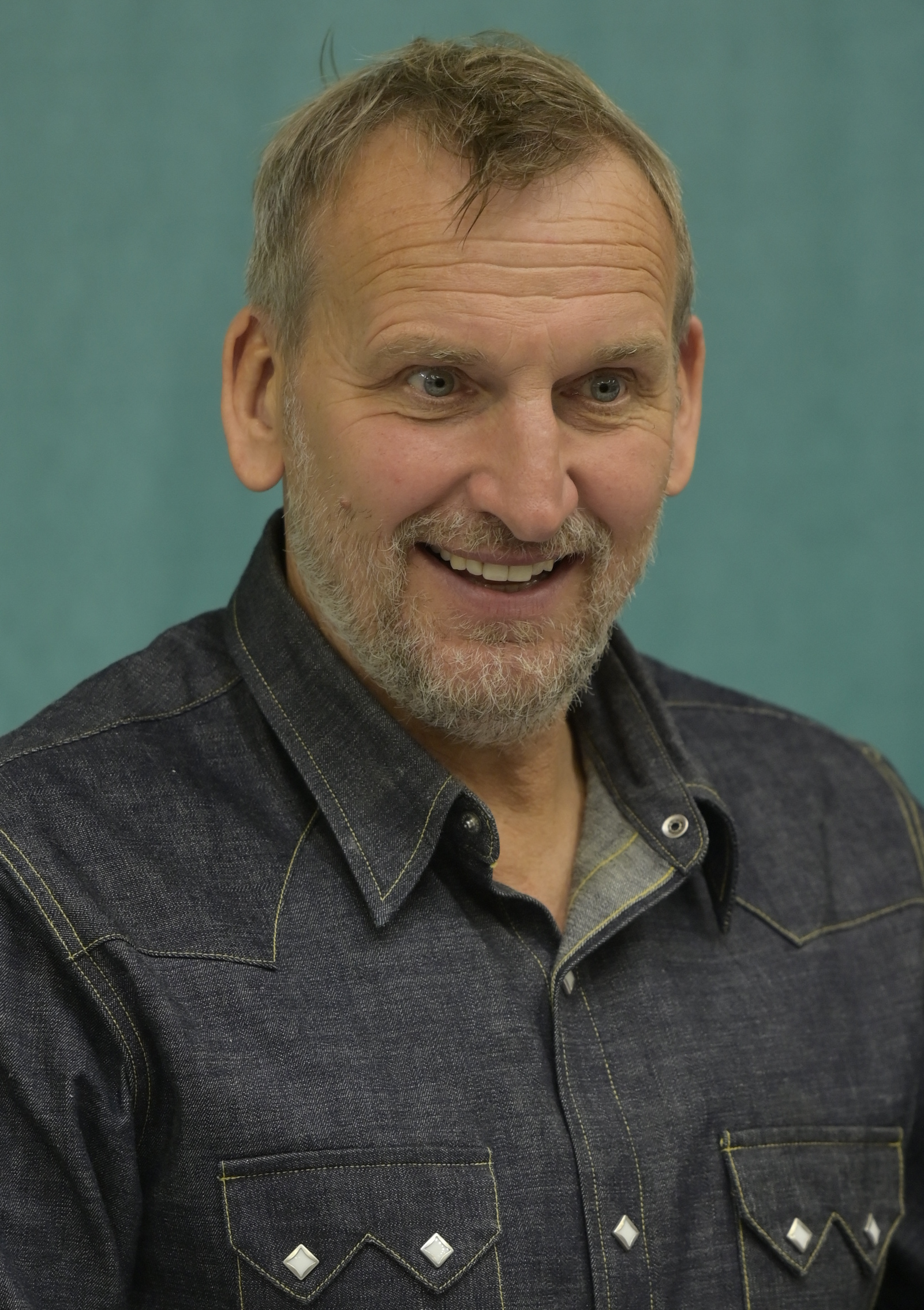
Eccleston at GalaxyCon Minneapolis in 2019

Eccleston played Pod Clock in a 2011 television film adaptation of Mary Norton's children's novel The Borrowers on BBC One. In July 2012, he starred in the political thriller Blackout on BBC One. In the same month, he starred as Creon in an adaptation of Antigone at the Royal National Theatre; his performance in the play was praised as "charismatic" and "intense". Eccleston starred in the film Song for Marion (2012), also known as Unfinished Song, with Terence Stamp.

Eccleston portrayed the villainous dark elf Malekith in the 2013 superhero film Thor: The Dark World, the eighth instalment in the Marvel Cinematic Universe. The film was panned, and in 2019 GQ ranked Malekith the weakest MCU villain. Eccleston compared working on the film to having a "gun in your mouth". Later in 2013, he played John Aspinall in Lucan, an ITV miniseries about the disappearance of Lord Lucan.

From 2014 to 2017, Eccleston starred as Reverend Matt Jamison on the HBO drama series The Leftovers, an adaptation of Tom Perrotta's 2011 novel, earning consistent acclaim for his performance across all three seasons. (Note: Attributed to multiple sources) Jamison was originally omitted from the television adaptation, but the character was reinstated after Eccleston convinced showrunner Damon Lindelof of his interpretation of the role. He was nominated for Best Supporting Actor in a Drama Series at the Critics' Choice Television Awards in 2015 and 2016.

In 2015, Eccleston appeared in the Sky Atlantic series Fortitude as a scientist at an Arctic research centre alongside Stanley Tucci and Michael Gambon. Eccleston starred with Marsha Thomason as a married couple in the ITV drama series Safe House (2015). Pre-production work reportedly began on the second season, but due to "confidential" circumstances, the season was rewritten and the original cast of characters were replaced. Eccleston played Leonard "Nipper" Read in the gangster film Legend (2015), opposite Tom Hardy as the Kray twins.

From 2016 to 2020, Eccleston played Maurice Scott, the grandfather of an autistic boy, in the drama series The A Word. Eccleston described the series as a highlight of his television career and a "benchmark" in its depiction of disabled characters.

Eccleston played the title role in the Royal Shakespeare Company's production of Macbeth in 2018. The production was broadcast live to cinemas on 11 April 2018. The production garnered middling reviews. Eccleston narrated the documentary series Ambulance. He starred in two films in 2018: as crime boss Harvey in Dead in a Week or Your Money Back and as Nazi officer Heinz in Where Hands Touch. That same year he played Oswald in a BBC television film adaptation of King Lear. For his role in the television miniseries Come Home (2018), he was nominated for an International Emmy Award for Best Actor.

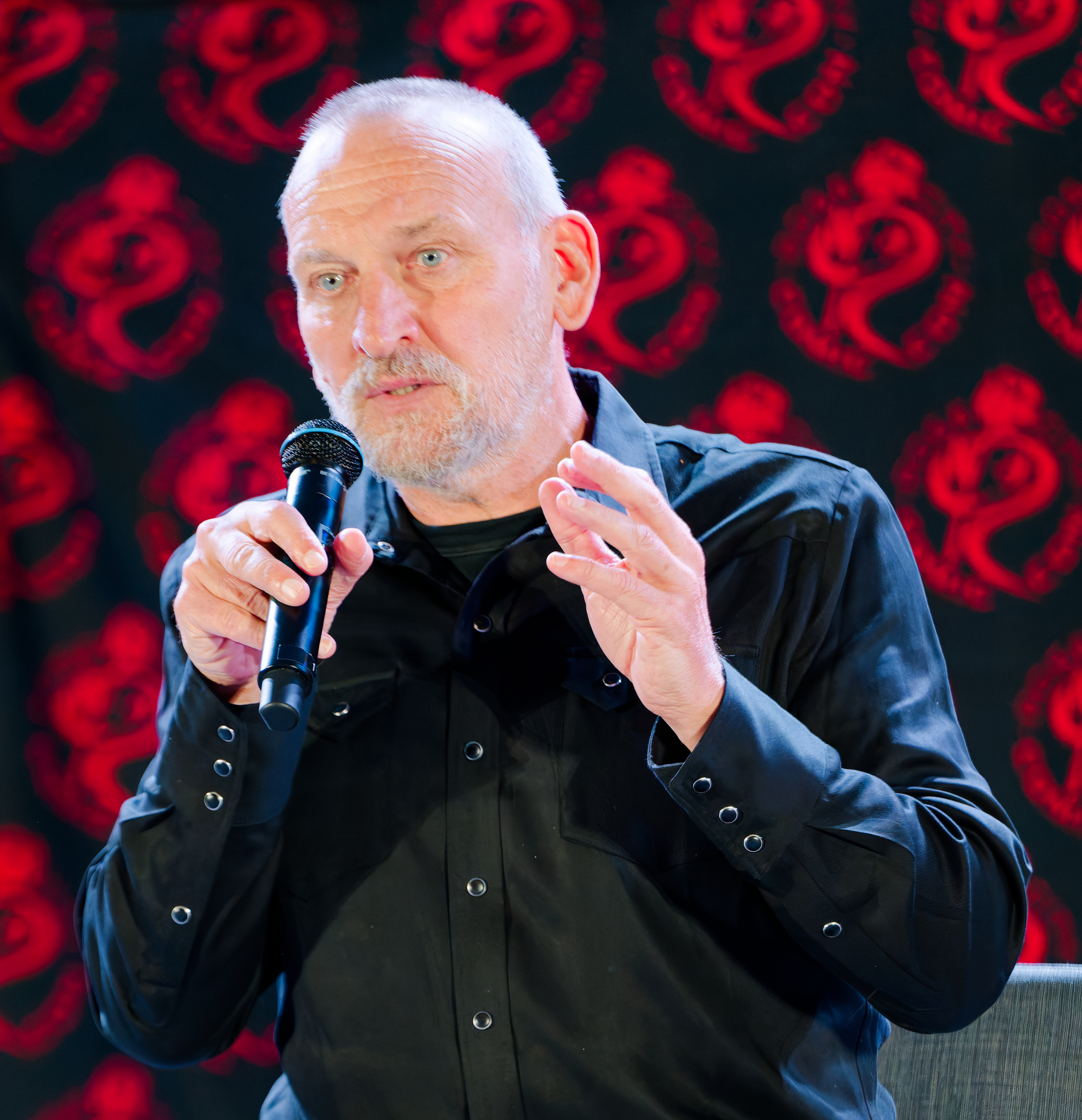
Eccleston at Rose City Comic Con in 2025

=== Later work (2021–present) ===
Eccleston starred in the six-part television mini-series Close to Me (2021), based on the 2017 book by Amanda Reynolds. He played Fagin in the BBC family comedy drama series Dodger (2022–present), a prequel to the events of Oliver Twist. The comedic role was a departure for Eccleston: "Because I am the most miserable man in British television... I never thought anyone would cast me in a comedy." He appeared in a 2022 television film adaptation of Kit de Waal's award-winning 2016 novel My Name is Leon.

From November 2023 to January 2024, Eccleston played Ebenezer Scrooge in a production of A Christmas Carol at The Old Vic. Eccleston portrayed Scottish swimmer Jabez Wolffe in the 2024 biographical sports drama Young Woman and the Sea. He appeared in the fourth season of the American crime drama series True Detective (2024) as Ted Connelly, the love interest of Jodie Foster's character. He played Mr Phillips, leader of a religious sect, in the Netflix miniseries Unchosen (2026).

Eccleston will appear as Crayford in the upcoming crime comedy film Chasing Millions, which is based on the 2004 Northern Bank robbery. He will also appear in the upcoming British film Hear Me Roar.

== Personal life ==
Eccleston married Mischka, a copywriter, in November 2011. The couple had a daughter and a son, and they divorced in December 2015. Eccleston is a lifelong supporter of Manchester United, and is a regular marathon runner. In 2007, Salford's Pendleton College named its new 260-seat auditorium, the Eccleston Theatre, after Christopher Eccleston. In 2019, Eccleston released his autobiography, I Love the Bones of You: My Father And The Making Of Me. In his autobiography, he described his lifelong experiences with anorexia and body dysmorphia, and said that he had considered suicide. He was hospitalised in 2016 with severe clinical depression.

=== Political views and activism ===
In 2000, Eccleston stated: "The work I have chosen to do has meant that I have played a lot of conflicted people. That comes out of my conviction that what's on our TV screens should be of value." He is an ambassador for The Big Issue, a British street newspaper which supports homeless people. Eccleston was also a Mencap charity ambassador, and supports the British Red Cross. He supports research for Alzheimer's disease and other forms of dementia; his father had vascular dementia in his later years, from 1998 until his death in 2012.

Eccleston has criticised the Conservative Party and has held them responsible for what he has described as a decline in opportunities for working-class actors. (Note: Attributed to multiple sources) He said in July 2017, "It's always been a policy of the Conservative government and party to destroy working class identity. If you prevent them from having a cultural voice, which is what's happening, they achieve that. They hate us, they want to destroy us, so we're being ruled out of having a voice."

In 2016, Eccleston described Brexit as "a huge step backwards", stating it "was an absolute disaster, and I am deeply ashamed of my country." He endorsed Labour Party incumbent Andy Burnham in the 2021 Greater Manchester mayoral election. Eccleston is also a British republican who supports the abolition of the British monarchy.

=== Religious beliefs ===
On his religious upbringing, Eccleston said in 2015: "My dad's family were Catholic. My mum was very Church of England – still is – but it doesn't work for me." In 2016, he stated he was agnostic: "when I was stomping around saying I was an atheist, I was not thinking about it enough... there is certainly a huge part of me that feels intense anger against organized religion. But I do feel, at the moment, a little more spiritually open to what may be religious beliefs. I mean, if anything, Buddhism is - which is a philosophy, of course - the thing that makes the most sense to me". In 2017 he identified himself as "a peace-loving atheist", criticising organised religion and calling for "a spiritual revolution". In 2019 he reiterated that he was an atheist.

== Bibliography ==
Year	Title	Publisher	ISBN	Notes
2019	I Love the Bones of You: My Father And The Making Of Me	Simon & Schuster UK	978-1471176319	

== Awards and nominations ==
=== BAFTA Awards ===
Year	Category	Nominated work	Result	Ref.
BAFTA TV Awards
1997	Best Actor	Our Friends in the North	Nominated	
2004	Best Actor	The Second Coming	Nominated	
BAFTA Cymru Awards
2006	Best Actor	Doctor Who	Nominated	

=== Emmy Awards ===
Year	Category	Nominated work	Result	Ref.
International Emmy Awards
2011	Best Actor	Accused	Won	
2019	Best Actor	Come Home	Nominated	

=== Miscellaneous awards ===
Association	Year	Category	Work	Result	Ref.
Golden Satellite Award	1997	Best Actor in a Motion Picture – Drama	Jude	Nominated	
Broadcasting Press Guild Award	1997	Best Actor	Our Friends in the North	Won	
Royal Television Society Award	2003	Best Actor	Flesh and Blood	Won	
TV Choice Award	2005	Best Actor	Doctor Who	Won	
National Television Awards	2005	Most Popular Actor	Doctor Who	Won	
Broadcasting Press Guild Award	2005	Best Actor	Doctor Who	Nominated	
Satellite Award	2015	Best Supporting Actor – Series, Miniseries, or Television Film	The Leftovers	Nominated	
Critics' Choice Television Awards	2015	Best Supporting Actor in a Drama Series	The Leftovers	Nominated	
Critics' Choice Television Awards	2016	Best Supporting Actor in a Drama Series	The Leftovers	Nominated	
