= The Lowry Academy =

Location
- Hilton Lane; Little Hulton; City of Salford, Greater Manchester, M28 0SY; England
- 53.5221°N 2.41048°W

Information
- Type: Academy
- Established: September 2001
- Local authority: Salford City Council
- Trust: United Learning
- Department for Education URN: 148393 Tables
- Ofsted: Reports
- Principal: Claire Coy
- Gender: Coeducational
- Age: 11 to 16
- Website: https://www.lowryacademy.org.uk/

The Lowry Academy (formerly known as Harrop Fold School) is a state coeducational secondary school located in Salford, Greater Manchester, England, which serves pupils from Little Hulton and Walkden. The school came to prominence from being featured in the Educating... TV series.

The school is named after the noted Salford artist, L.S. Lowry.

== History ==
The school was formed in 2001 from the merger of Joseph Eastham High School in Salford and Little Hulton Community School in Little Hulton. Originally on both former schools' sites, a new building was subsequently constructed on the playing fields of Joseph Eastham High School and the old building demolished in 2008.

The school has a very high proportion of pupils who are economically disadvantaged.

In 2003, Ofsted inspectors told the governing body that Harrop Fold was the "worst school in the country".

In 2005, the school had improved and 94% of teaching was judged satisfactory or better.

In 2010 and again in 2013 the school was judged Good.

In 2018 the headteacher, Drew Povey, was first suspended and then resigned. This was linked to allegations that the school had wrongly recorded information, possibly in order to make results appear better than they were ("off-rolling"). He had served as headteacher since February 2010. Later in the year the school was judged Inadequate and placed back into Special Measures. In 2024, Povey faced a professional conduct panel in relation to the allegations relating to off-rolling and record keeping, and was subsequently banned from teaching in England after being found to have committed unacceptable professional conduct.

Previously a community school administered by Salford City Council, in March 2021 Harrop Fold School converted to academy status. The school is now sponsored by United Learning. In September 2021 the school completed its transformation and was renamed The Lowry Academy, after the Salford-born artist, L. S. Lowry, with a new uniform and logo.

In February 2024, Ofsted judged the school as "Good."

On 26 March 2026, Tate Liverpool loaned a work by L. S. Lowry titled "Dwelling Ordsall Lane, Salford 1927" for two days to The Lowry Academy with a positive reception from students.

== Television coverage ==
The school was featured in Educating Greater Manchester on Channel 4.

== Controversy ==
In November 2025, the school's library participated in the banning of books which were deemed inappropriate by the school leadership with wholly use from generative AI to form judgements. Book titles include the young adult vampire-romance novel, Twilight for "mature romantic themes, sexual tension, and violence involving vampires and werewolves", several books revolving around LGBTQ culture, such as Heartstopper and a graphic novel of Nineteen Eighty-Four.

The school's librarian later resigned after facing disciplinary action, with the school responding that they "don't recognise" the librarian's version of events, stating only "a very small amount of books were deemed inappropriate even for older children due to their content and have been removed" with the school later restructuring the contents of the library to have designated age-restricted sections.

In a response to an online newspaper, The Mill, MP for Bolton South and Walkden, Yasmin Qureshi, condemned the school's actions.
