= Mr Drew's School for Boys =

British television programme

- Title card (2014)
- Genre: Drama, education, behaviour management
- Starring: Stephen Drew
- Narrated by: Nick Frost
- Country of origin: United Kingdom
- Original language: English
- No. of seasons: 1
- No. of episodes: 4

Production
- Producer: Viki Kolar
- Production location: Writtle University College (Essex)
- Camera setup: Multi camera Dual cameras
- Running time: 60 mins (including advertisements)

Original release
- Network: Channel 4
- Release: April 29 – May 20, 2014

Related
- Educating Essex (2011)

Mr Drew's School for Boys is a British television programme which aired on Channel 4 from April until May 2014. The programme follows "Mr Drew" (Stephen Drew), who previously featured in another Channel 4 documentary, Educating Essex during his tenure as Deputy Headteacher at Passmores Academy. In the series, Mr Drew is the Headteacher of a summer school in Writtle, Essex for boys who are challenging and have behavioural issues, with most of them being excluded from their schools. All boys in the programme were under the age of 12, with the youngest aged eight.

The series premiered on 29 April 2014, with the first episode attracting a viewing audience of 1.7 million.

== Background ==
The programme features eleven boys from around the United Kingdom who have challenging behaviour and have been excluded from mainstream school. In an attempt to improve their behaviour, the eleven boys have enrolled in a summer school programme, led by Mr Drew and a small team of teachers and pastoral support staff. The boys' parents also feature in the programme, with their parents receiving lessons and guidance on effective parental techniques and support which will hopefully improve their sons behaviour.

The synopsis for the programme was inspired by UK Government statistics released at the time which revealed that boys aged 12 and under are almost six times more likely than girls to be excluded from school.

== Cast ==
Max Carr (left), PE Teacher Dominic Volante (centre) and Max's mum, Ruth (right) in Episode 2

=== Summer school staff ===
- Stephen Drew; "Mr Drew": The headteacher of the summer school. Previously featured in Educating Essex as one of the schools Deputy Headteachers (2011)
- Dominic Volante: Teacher of PE
- Mark Grist: Teacher of English & Drama
- Lindsay Skinner: Teacher of Mathematics
- Benjamin Vidler: Teacher of Science

=== Narrator ===
- Nick Frost; 4 episodes

== Episodes ==
No.	Title	Written by	Original release date	UK viewers (millions)
1	"Episode 1"	Viki Kolar, Vicky Bray & Lisa Cox	29 April 2014	1.7m
The boys are not keen to play by the rules and there is an altercation before they even make it to their first class. Two of them skip lessons and insult Mr Drew when he investigates.
2	"Episode 2"	Viki Kolar, Vicky Bray & Lisa Cox	6 May 2014	1.6m
A week into summer school and Mr Drew starts tackling the families' problems head on. He is confronted with some shocking video footage and uproar over the school's healthy snacks policy.
3	"Episode 3"	Viki Kolar, Vicky Bray & Lisa Cox	13 May 2014	N/A
The boys must play a football match against a local team where they're not allowed to swear or foul. Can they rise to the challenge or will the beautiful game turn ugly?
4	"Episode 4"	Viki Kolar, Vicky Bray & Lisa Cox	20 May 2014	N/A
Summer is almost over, but before the boys return home to their normal schools, there is an end-of-term family camping trip, with team activities, marshmallows, and some flare-ups!

== Reception ==
Catriona Wightman from the Digital Spy praised the series for its ability to "not paint these boys out to be absolute terrors", but also highlighted the "impossible task" that Mr Drew or Channel 4 had set for him, recognising the challenges of the boys' behaviour in the series.

Pat Thomson, Professor of Education at the University of Nottingham criticised the programme, claiming that the majority of boys from working families who may display challenging behaviour would not be able to afford fees associated with a summer school programme similar to what was featured in the programme.

The Metro gave the series favourable reviews, claiming that "Mr Drew had been missed" since his last appearance on television in Educating Essex.

== See also ==
- Education in the United Kingdom
- Behaviour management
