= List of Educating episodes =

Educating... is a British documentary reality television programme which first aired on 22 September 2011. It has run for four series. The show took a year break before announcing the fifth series which aired in 2017 on Channel 4. It uses a fly on the wall format to show the everyday lives of the staff and pupils of secondary schools all over the UK. It shows an insight to the realities of a British secondary school.

During the course of the programme, 55 episodes of Educating aired over seven series.

== Series overview ==
Series	Title	Episodes	Originally released		Average viewers (millions)
Series	Title	Episodes	First released	Last released	Average viewers (millions)
1	Essex	7	22 September 2011	3 November 2011	1.99
2	Yorkshire	10	5 September 2013	21 August 2014	3.46
3	The East End	8	4 September 2014	23 October 2014	1.44
4	Cardiff	8	25 August 2015	13 October 2015	1.71
5	Greater Manchester	8	31 August 2017	19 October 2017	2.54
6	Greater Manchester 2	4	3 November 2020	17 November 2020	1.81
7	Yorkshire 2	8	31 August 2025	19 October 2025	TBD

== Episodes ==
=== Series 1: Essex (2011) ===
No. overall	Episode	Original release date	UK viewers (millions)
1	Episode 1	22 September 2011	1.92
2	Episode 2	29 September 2011	1.79
3	Episode 3	6 October 2011	2.01
4	Episode 4	13 October 2011	2.11
5	Episode 5	20 October 2011	2.05
6	Episode 6	27 October 2011	1.97
7	Episode 7	3 November 2011	2.06

=== Series 2: Yorkshire (2013–14) ===
No. overall	Episode	Original release date	UK viewers (millions)
8	Episode 1	5 September 2013	4.19
9	Episode 2	12 September 2013	4.00
10	Episode 3	19 September 2013	3.90
11	Episode 4	26 September 2013	3.43
12	Episode 5	3 October 2013	3.34
13	Episode 6	10 October 2013	3.69
14	Episode 7	17 October 2013	3.48
15	Episode 8	24 October 2013	3.53
16	Episode 9: "Educating Yorkshire at Christmas"	19 December 2013	2.75
17	Episode 10: "One Year On"	21 August 2014	2.24

=== Series 3: The East End (2014) ===
No. overall	Episode	Original release date	UK viewers (millions)
18	Episode 1	4 September 2014	2.70
19	Episode 2	11 September 2014	2.26
20	Episode 3	18 September 2014	2.10
21	Episode 4	25 September 2014	1.97
22	Episode 5	2 October 2014	1.91
23	Episode 6	9 October 2014	1.80
24	Episode 7	16 October 2014	1.66
25	Episode 8	23 October 2014	N/A

=== Series 4: Cardiff (2015) ===
No. overall	Episode	Original release date	UK viewers (millions)
28	Episode 1	25 August 2015	2.11
29	Episode 2	1 September 2015	2.00
30	Episode 3	8 September 2015	1.62
31	Episode 4	15 September 2015	1.91
32	Episode 5	22 September 2015	1.61
33	Episode 6	29 September 2015	1.50
34	Episode 7	6 October 2015	1.50
35	Episode 8	13 October 2015	1.46

=== Series 5: Greater Manchester (2017) ===
No. overall	Episode	Original release date	UK viewers (millions)
36	Episode 1	31 August 2017	2.76
37	Episode 2	7 September 2017	2.73
38	Episode 3	14 September 2017	2.71
39	Episode 4	21 September 2017	2.65
40	Episode 5	28 September 2017	2.50
41	Episode 6	5 October 2017	2.43
42	Episode 7	12 October 2017	2.32
43	Episode 8	19 October 2017	2.19

=== Series 6: Greater Manchester 2 (2020) ===
No. overall	Episode	Original release date	UK viewers (millions)
44	Episode 1	3 November 2020	2.50
45	Episode 2	4 November 2020	1.41
46	Episode 3	10 November 2020	1.94
47	Episode 4	17 November 2020	1.39

=== Series 7: Yorkshire 2 (2025) ===
No. overall	Episode	Original release date	UK viewers (millions)
48	Episode 1	31 August 2025	TBD
49	Episode 2	7 September 2025	TBD
50	Episode 3	14 September 2025	TBD
51	Episode 4	21 September 2025	TBD
52	Episode 5	28 September 2025	TBD
53	Episode 6	5 October 2025	TBD
54	Episode 7	12 October 2025	TBD
55	Episode 8	19 October 2025	TBD

== Educating: What I Wish I'd Known... ==
No.	Title	Original release date
1	"Educating Essex: Gabby"	1 August 2014
Gabby was one of the brightest students in her year, taking some GCSEs early. But she then became a victim of bullying and then she cried a lot and reared up emotionally and grades dropped down. During a return visit, Gabby explains how she overcame her obstacles.
2	"Educating Essex: Ryan"	1 August 2014
Ryan, who has Asperger's Syndrome, explains how he overcame his fears about school, and how leaving school proved to be his greatest challenge. Proud of his progress, he returns to see Mr Goddard.
3	"Educating Essex: Sam"	1 August 2014
At school, Sam was a teenage rebel with a short temper, constantly getting into trouble. Three years later and after becoming a dad, Sam is in a reflective mood.
4	"Educating Yorkshire: Hannah and Sheridan"	1 August 2014
In Year 11, Hannah and Sheridan were among the school's most popular students. But by messing around, the girls struggled to get good grades. Now at college, they need to knuckle down.
5	"Educating Yorkshire: Robbie-Joe"	1 August 2014
In Year 7, cheeky chappy Robbie-Joe was in trouble four out of five days. He looks back on his challenging behaviour. Is he now a model student? Has he realised how serious things are for his future?
6	"Educating Yorkshire: Tom"	1 August 2014
In Year 10, Tom's behaviour was lively. But it was the unexpected death of his step-brother that pushed his behaviour beyond all limits. Eighteen months on, he explains how he turned his life around.
