= Falmouth School =

Location
- Trescobeas Road; Falmouth, Cornwall, TR11 4LH; England; 50.1581°N 5.09554°W

Information
- Type: Academy
- Motto: Achieving Continuing Excellence
- Established: 1899
- Local authority: Cornwall Council
- Department for Education URN: 137223 Tables
- Ofsted: Reports
- Head teacher: Joanne Guest
- Staff: 100 (approx.)
- Gender: Coeducational
- Age: 11 to 18
- Capacity: 1,289 (100 in 6th form college)
- Houses: Smithwick, Boscawen, Trelawney, Melvill
- Colour: Blue
- Website: https://www.falmouthschool.net/web/home/633695

Falmouth School (formerly Trescobeas County Secondary School) is a coeducational secondary school and sixth form with academy status, located in Falmouth in the county of Cornwall.

Previously a community school administered by Cornwall Council, Falmouth School converted to academy status on 1 August 2011. However the school continues to coordinate with Cornwall Council for admissions. The school has also purchased the site of the former Budock Hospital to use as an area for students to play sports during PE lessons. Within the past decade, the school has developed a large astro turf area, bordering Trescobeas Rd and adjacent to it is the Falmouth School Sports Hub, featuring the Evolve community gym.

Falmouth School offers GCSEs and BTECs as programmes of study for pupils, while students in the sixth form have the option to study from a range of A-levels, OCR Nationals, NVQs and further BTECs.

In 2019, the school received a rating of "Inadequate" in an Ofsted inspection amid off-rolling concerns. A subsequent inspection in 2023 changed the rating to "Requires Improvement", following this from an inspection in May 2025 the school achieved the ranking "good" in all areas.

== Notable former pupils ==
- Mike Barnett, Australian politician
- Matthew Etherington, footballer
- Sarah Newton, politician
- Oliver Parker, film director
- Charlotte Watts, mathematician, epidemiologist and academic
