= 19th National Television Awards =

British awards ceremony in 2014

- Date: 22 January 2014
- Location: The O2 Arena, London
- Country: United Kingdom
- Presented by: Dermot O'Leary
- Website: http://www.nationaltvawards.com/

Television/radio coverage
- Network: ITV
- Runtime: 180 mins (inc. adverts)

The 19th National Television Awards was held at The O2 Arena on 22 January 2014. The event was presented by Dermot O'Leary, who himself was nominated for an award. The ceremony was broadcast live on ITV.

Ant & Dec, Coronation Street and Doctor Who were among the big winners, whilst Benedict Cumberbatch picked up the new TV detective award. This is the only ceremony not to feature the Special Recognition Award.

== Awards ==
Category Presenter(s)	Winner	Nominated
Factual Entertainment Programme; Presented by Sam Bailey and Michael Bolton	Paul O'Grady: For the Love of Dogs (ITV)	The Great British Bake Off (BBC Two); An Idiot Abroad (Sky One); Top Gear (BBC Two)
Entertainment Programme; Presented by Tom Daley	I'm a Celebrity...Get Me Out of Here! (ITV)	Celebrity Juice (ITV2); Ant & Dec's Saturday Night Takeaway (ITV); The Graham Norton Show (BBC One)
Documentary; Presented by Hugh Bonneville	Educating Yorkshire (Channel 4)	Penguins - Spy in the Huddle (BBC One); Inside Death Row with Trevor McDonald (ITV); Paul O'Grady's Working Britain (BBC One)
Newcomer; Presented by Danny Dyer and Kellie Bright	Khali Best (Dexter Hartman, EastEnders)	Anna Passey (Sienna Blake, Hollyoaks); Michelle Hardwick (Vanessa Woodfield, Emmerdale); Marc Baylis (Rob Donovan, Coronation Street)
Drama Performance; Presented by the cast of The Musketeers	Matt Smith (Doctor Who)	Maggie Smith (Downton Abbey); Miranda Hart (Call the Midwife); Martin Clunes (Doc Martin)
Daytime Programme; Presented by Michelle Keegan	This Morning (ITV)	The Jeremy Kyle Show (ITV); Pointless (BBC One); The Chase (ITV)
Comedy; Presented by Chris Noth	Mrs. Brown's Boys (BBC One/RTÉ One)	Derek (Channel 4); Miranda (BBC One); The Big Bang Theory (E4/CBS)
Serial Drama Performance; Presented by Nick Grimshaw	Julie Hesmondhalgh (Hayley Cropper, Coronation Street)	Michelle Keegan (Tina McIntyre, Coronation Street); David Neilson (Roy Cropper, Coronation Street); Jessie Wallace (Kat Slater, EastEnders)
TV Detective; Presented by Kiefer Sutherland	Benedict Cumberbatch (Sherlock)	Idris Elba (Luther); Suranne Jones (Scott & Bailey); Bradley Walsh (Law & Order: UK); Olivia Colman (Broadchurch); David Tennant (Broadchurch)
Entertainment Presenter; Presented by Craig Revel Horwood, Bruno Tonioli and Abbey Clancy	Ant & Dec	Keith Lemon; Alan Carr; Dermot O'Leary; Graham Norton
Drama; Presented by Roy Hodgson and Fernanda Lima	Doctor Who (BBC One)	Downton Abbey (ITV); Call the Midwife (BBC One); Broadchurch (ITV)
Serial Drama; Presented by a member of the audience	Coronation Street (ITV)	Emmerdale (ITV); Hollyoaks (Channel 4); EastEnders (BBC One)
Talent Show; Presented by Naomi Campbell	Strictly Come Dancing (BBC One)	Britain's Got Talent (ITV); Dancing on Ice (ITV); The X Factor (ITV); The Voice UK (BBC One)
Landmark Award; Presented by Phillip Schofield	Ant & Dec	
