= Giggle incontinence =

Accidental loss of urine triggered by giggling or laughter

Giggle incontinence, giggle enuresis or enuresis risoria is the involuntary release of urine in response to giggling or laughter. The bladder may empty completely or only partially.

Giggle incontinence is more common in children than adults, typically appearing at ages 5 to 7, and is most common in girls near the onset of puberty (age 10 to 12) but can also happen to boys/males. The condition tends to improve with age, with fewer episodes during the teenage years, but may persist into the teenage years or adulthood. A survey of 99 student nurses indicated that about 25% had experienced such a wetting event during their lifetime, and about 10% were still susceptible in their late teens.

Giggle incontinence is a special form of urge incontinence, and is not the same as stress incontinence, which is generally brought on by participating in vigorous sport.

== Cause ==
In voluntary urination, the bladder's normally relaxed detrusor muscle contracts to squeeze urine from the bladder. One study, of 109 children diagnosed with giggle incontinence at Schneider Children's Hospital in New York, concluded that the cause of giggle incontinence is involuntary contraction of the detrusor muscle induced by laughter. Because the complaint is difficult to reproduce under controlled conditions, its triggering mechanism is not clearly understood, but may be related to cataplexy, a sudden transient episode of loss of muscle tone often triggered by strong emotions.

== Social consequences ==
Episodes of giggle incontinence are embarrassing and socially incapacitating, diminishing the quality of life. Those having the condition learn to adapt by avoiding activities that may bring on laughter (such as being tickled, watching a comedy movie or TV program, or reading/listening to funny stories or jokes). Other approaches include limiting fluid intake, trying to remain seated, and concealing stains and leakage by wearing absorbent pads and dark clothing.

== Treatment ==
Favorable response to treatment with the ADHD drug methylphenidate (Ritalin) has been reported, but this treatment option is not acceptable to all patient families. Dr. Lane Robson, of The Children's Clinic in Calgary, Alberta, says "If a child is having a wetting episode once a month, medicating them daily is probably not a good treatment. If it's a daily issue, you may have to make that decision."

== See also ==
- Urinary incontinence
