= Thornhill Community Academy =

Academy in Thornhill, Dewsbury, West Yorkshire, England

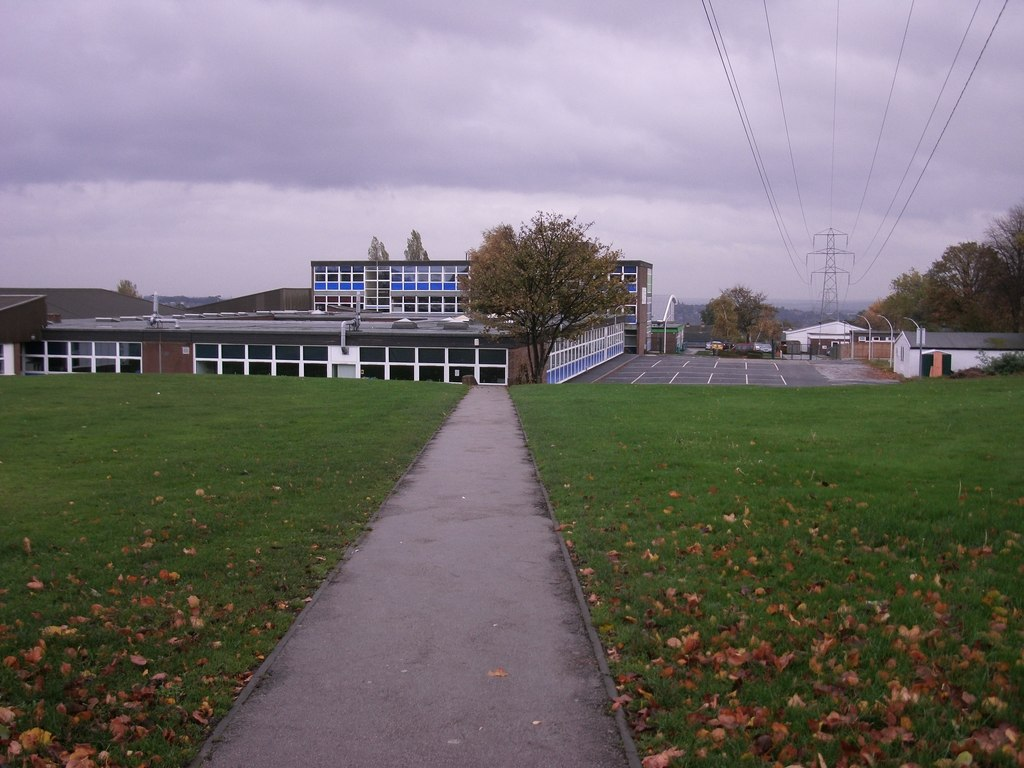
- Current school badge A view towards the school in 2013

Location
- Valley Drive; Thornhill; Dewsbury, West Yorkshire, WF12 0HE; England; 53.66033°N 1.61751°W

Information
- Type: Academy
- Established: 25 November 1964
- Local authority: Kirklees Council
- Department for Education URN: 146365 Tables
- Ofsted: Reports
- Head Teacher: Matthew Burton
- Gender: Coeducational
- Age: 11 to 16
- Enrolment: 902 (2026)
- Houses: Austen; Bronte; Dickens; Shakespeare
- Colour
- Website: Thornhill Community Academy

Thornhill Community Academy is an 11–16 coeducational secondary school with academy status situated just outside Dewsbury, West Yorkshire, England, on the western side of Kirklees (Huddersfield) and near the M1 and the M62 motorways. It serves both the urban and rural areas of Dewsbury and draws from the villages of Thornhill, Thornhill Lees and Savile Town. In September 2025, the school had a total of 910 pupils enrolled, despite only having capacity for 900 students.

The school attracted national attention in 2013 after being featured on the British television documentary Educating Yorkshire which won Most Popular Documentary Series at the National Television Awards. Educating... returned to Thornhill Community Academy through the 2024-25 academic year to film for the seventh series, airing between August and October 2025.

== History ==
Thornhill Community Academy opened as Thornhill Secondary School on 25 November 1964 under the authority of the County Borough of Dewsbury Education Committee. Amongst the dignitaries attending the opening ceremony of the school included the Mayor of Dewsbury and the Rector of Thornhill, the Reverend Christopher Spafford. The initial design process for the school commenced in 1960, with the construction process formally underway by 1962. The school building was completed by 1964 before being handed over to the County Borough of Dewsbury Education Committee in May 1964, with Mr McAllister appointed as the inaugural Headmaster of the school. The total cost of construction of the school was estimated to be £230,000.

By the 1970s, the school faced an increase in pupil numbers, with a new teaching block being erected and science teaching spaces being developed in the late 1970s through to the 1980s. Between 2001 and 2004, further additional spaces to be used for teaching were added to the site to continue to meet the increase in demand for secondary educational provision in the area, with the school sports hall being the latest addition to the site, having been completed in 2007.

The school formally joined the SHARE multi academy trust in September 2018. It fully converted to an academy convertor on 1 November 2018.

== Site ==
A major building programme began in May 2002, with an investment of £4.2 million under the Public Private Partnership Initiative. This work involved a complete upgrade of all college buildings including new areas in Design Technology, Creative and Expressive Arts, Humanities and a new Learning Resource Centre. A sports hall and muga has been built which is open to pupils and the public. Each department has its own designated specialist teaching area. There is a music suite, a dance and drama studio, six science laboratories and a science resource centre, two art studios, an area for modern foreign languages with study room, a sports hall, gym, P.E. classroom, tennis courts, playing fields and an isolation room.

== Curriculum ==
The school follows the National Curriculum to GCSE level, with some subjects compulsory, and others as options. Some pupils study English Literature and Statistics following primary GCSE courses. Pupils taking each science as a separate subject, study for three GCSEs, one each for Physics, Chemistry and Biology. Triple science is offered to some pupils where the Double Award or Science Nationals is offered to others. During the first three years Food Technology, Graphics, Resistant Materials and Textiles and French or Urdu are taught, with pupils choosing one of these to continue at GCSE level later.

In their inspection report of the school conducted in 2023, Ofsted said that Thornhill Community Academy have "developed a curriculum that meets the needs of pupils well", and that the school has in place a "well planned personal development curriculum".

== Educating Yorkshire ==
In January and February 2013 cameras were placed in the school for the filming of the Channel 4 series Educating Yorkshire. The series started on 5 September 2013. The show later won the National Television Award for Documentary. The award was accepted by Headteacher Mr Mitchell, Deputy Head Mr Steer, Assistant Head Mr Burton and former student Musharaf. A second series was filmed in the 2024-25 school year, Mr Burton is now the headteacher. It aired on Channel 4 from August to October 2025.
