= Off-rolling =

Removing students from school rolls to influence school statistics

Off-rolling or offrolling is the practice in the United Kingdom whereby pupils are removed from the school roll for reasons that suit the school's, rather than the pupil's, interests. This often involves schools removing low-achieving pupils prior to public exams taking place, in order to boost the school's statistics.

== Definition ==
Ofsted defines the practice:

Off-rolling is the practice of removing a pupil from the school roll without using a permanent exclusion, when the removal is primarily in the best interests of the school, rather than the best interests of the pupil. This includes pressuring a parent to remove their child from the school roll.

== Process ==
The first a classroom teacher will know is that a child is not in class anymore. Requests to the senior leadership team (SLT) for information give no response or details, just that the parent has removed them. According to a report published by Ofsted in 2019, 24% of secondary teachers have experienced off-rolling, while an additional 51% had heard of it but not experienced it. Teachers typically become suspicious that off-rolling is taking place when children disappear at key points in the year, when they have been recently asked for a behaviour report about the child, or if the child is known to have low attendance or results. They may also become suspicious when the off-rolled child was being discussed for permanent exclusion. It can be possible for transfers to be genuine, but in a situation where the reasons aren't given, off-rolling is often assumed.

Two techniques have been used: transferring a child who is already receiving help to an alternative provider (AP), such as a specialist behavioural or autism unit, fully onto the units roll, or persuading the parents that it is in everyone's interest if the child remains at home and is taught by the family or privately. When the school census is completed and the statistics collated, the child's poor results will not depress the schools average.

=== Legitimate reasons to remove a child from the school roll ===
This is governed by the Education (Pupil Registration) (England) Regulations 2006 – Regulation 8.

- AP - Alternative provision - The school pays an independent alternative provider to take the child. At first the child is dual-rolled, remaining on both rolls. Then there is a managed move, where the alternative provision takes total responsibility for the child and the results that child achieves. The child is removed from the mainstream schools roll. This is considered acceptable if done in the best interest of the child, but is otherwise considered off-rolling.
- EHE - Elected Home Education - The parents decide to educate the child at home. If this is initiated by the parents and the headteacher makes a reasonable attempt to point out how this may disadvantage the child, this is accepted. If the parents have not been given enough information or have been coerced to remove the child, this is off-rolling.
- Moving house a distance away (usually 6 miles) making it unreasonable to provide school transport.
- Not returning to school after a holiday and being uncontactable, although this can cause other reasons for concern with girls from certain cultures who may be forced into marriage.
- Being out of contact with school and authorities for a period of 20 days.
- Failing to transition from kindergarten (nursery/reception) to primary school.
- Changing schools with both schools' approval.

== Prevalence ==
At the end of 2018, Ofsted identified 300 schools where the numbers leaving the roll was abnormally high. It would not name the schools but contacted their academy trust or controlling local authority. In June 2019, Ofsted failed Falmouth School where it found pupils had been removed “against the wishes of the family, the advice of the local authority and the professional judgement of other agencies.” The inspection of The Sutton Academy, St Helens, which is overseen by the St Helens College, showed 12 pupils who were receiving education, through an AP in the dual-roll mode, were transferred to the AP, removing them from Sutton's roll. This practice had been going on, there and in other local schools with the knowledge of the local authority for several years. It has now stopped. Other schools criticised by Ofsted for off-rolling pupils are Harrop Fold School in Salford and the Shenley E-ACT Academy in Birmingham, both of which were put in special measures. The Discovery Academy, Stoke-on-Trent had it management rating downgraded on the personal intervention of Amanda Spielman.

Philip Nye, working for FFT Education Datalab, explains that in total, 24,600 pupils disappeared from mainstream schools last year, leaving for unknown destinations. The previous year it was 22,000. These were students that had been there the year before and now were not. It is estimated that as many as 9,000 disadvantaged 16-year-olds were not taking exams or recorded in school league tables because they cannot be located on school records.

== Statistics ==
Jason Bradbury, Ofsted's chief statistician, has identified certain trends, including that London is particularly badly affected. “Academies, particularly those in some multi-academy trusts, appear to be losing proportionately more pupils than local authority schools. Conversely, local authority schools seem to be taking on proportionately more pupils”.

The Education Select Committee in July 2018 said that “off-rolling is in part driven by school policies created by the Department for Education”. “The Department cannot wash its hands of the issue, just as schools cannot wash their hands of their pupils.” Progress 8 incentivises exclusion; it detering schools from retaining pupils “classed as difficult or challenging”.

The government under pressure, delegated the task of eliminating it to Ofsted. Ofsted rewrote its inspection quidelines, and as a consequence action started to be taken against high off-rollers. The message was that off-rolling was not transparent, where exclusion had a set of verifiable procedures so was fairer. The National Association of Head Teachers warn that the resulting confusion will unreasonably drive up the rate of permanent exclusions.

== Consequences ==
When pupils are off-rolled, the consequences for them are severe: only around one per cent of children who leave to an alternative provision or a special school achieve the benchmark five good GCSEs. About 20,000 children leave the rolls of mainstream secondary schools to a range of other destinations: with only six per cent achieving five good GCSEs.
