= Passmores Academy =

Location
- Tracyes Road; Harlow, Essex, CM18 6JH; England; 51.75721°N 0.12355°E

Information
- Type: Academy
- Motto: Improving Upon Our Best
- Opened: 1 September 2011
- Local authority: Essex County Council
- Trust: Passmores Cooperative Learning Community
- Department for Education URN: 137445 Tables
- Ofsted: Reports
- Chair: Neil Lawson
- Principal: Natalie Christie
- Age: 11 to 16
- Enrollment: 1204
- Capacity: 1200
- Houses: Dragon, Lion, Unicorn and Griffin
- Colours: Blue, Red, Green and Yellow
- Website: passmoresacademy.com

Passmores Academy is a 11-16 secondary school in Harlow, Essex.

The academy has an annual intake of 240 pupils in Year 7, and approximately 1,000 pupils. It featured in the 2011 television series Educating Essex.

The principal is Natalie Christie.

== History ==
The school was originally Passmores Comprehensive School, later becoming Passmores School and Technology College, until its conversion to Academy status in September 2011 when the name was changed to Passmores Academy.

The school reopened for the 2011–12 school year on a new site which is approximately one mile from its old site. This new site is the home of a £25 million new building which was constructed over a two-year period from 2009 on the old Brays Grove Secondary School site.

In November 2008 the school was graded as Outstanding by Ofsted, having been graded as Good in November 2005. It received a Good in May 2018.

In September 2013 Purford Green Primary School and Potter Street Primary School became part of Passmores Cooperative Learning Community as well as becoming feeder schools. In 2018 The Downs Primary School and Nursery joined.

== Curriculum ==
There is a two-year Key Stage 3, with French and Spanish the only languages offered.

== Educating Essex ==
The school was the setting for a seven-part Channel 4 reality TV show, Educating Essex. The show follows a group of GCSE pupils, and the staff who teach them, as they face the most important year in their education. The school was fitted with 65 fixed cameras – from the corridors to the canteen, and from the headteacher's office to the detention hall. Recording with the fixed cameras lasted for seven weeks. This was used alongside occasional standard filming by camera crews from September 2010 to August 2011 and edited into a seven-part series.

== Bereavement support during the COVID-19 pandemic ==
In 2020, the school was aware of the need to support children and staff who had had family members die during the COVID-19 pandemic.

== See also ==
- List of schools in Essex
- Technology college
