= Educating Yorkshire =

- Series 2
- No. of episodes: 10

Release
- Original network: Channel 4
- Original release: 5 September 2013 – 21 August 2014

Series chronology
- ← Previous; Series 1 Next → Series 3

Educating Yorkshire is the title of the second series of the British documentary television programme Educating... broadcast on Channel 4. The eight-episode series was first broadcast on 5 September 2013. Its format is based on the BAFTA Award-winning 2011 series Educating Essex. It follows the everyday lives of the staff and pupils of Thornhill Community Academy, a secondary school in Dewsbury, West Yorkshire. A Christmas special entitled Educating Yorkshire at Christmas was aired on 19 December 2013.

An episode titled Educating Yorkshire: One Year On was broadcast on 21 August 2014. This episode concentrated on some of the key pupils that the audience met throughout the original series, showing what had been going on in their lives over the past year. The show also included previous year 10 (now year 11) pupils opening their summer 2014 GCSE results. On 19 July 2024, Channel 4 announced that there would be a new series of Educating Yorkshire, to be shown in 2025.

== Episodes ==
No. overall	Episode	Original release date	UK viewers (millions)
8	Episode 1	5 September 2013	4.19
Newly appointed headteacher Mr Mitchell opens the school to a hopeful new year. This episode focuses on a variety of students, including Ryan, an enthusiastic Year 8 who hopes to become Prime Minister, or, failing that, an actor, fireman or policeman - any career as long as he's helping people. Ryan competes to be on school parliament with other pupils including Year 10 Bailey, who, despite being eager to become a prefect, has a poor behaviour record and frequently finds herself in isolation for smoking and wearing makeup. Meanwhile, Year 8 Kamrrem is one of the school's most challenging students. He falsely accuses another student of racially abusing him, and at one point throws snowballs at an elderly couple on a snow day alongside his friends. Nearly halfway into the year, following five official reports of students threatening to leave school due to bullying from Kamrren, his mum is called into school as he may be expelled from school soon. Mr. Mitchell, who always gives another chance, tells her how Kamrrem will be sent to a neighbouring school until his behaviour improves. Meanwhile, Ryan and Bailey try to become members of school parliament, the latter in order to boost her chances of becoming a prefect. Ryan is elected onto the school parliament, much to his surprise. Despite Bailey receiving more isolations and thus not being made a prefect, she stops smoking and tries to "tone down" the makeup.
9	Episode 2	12 September 2013	4.00
When Jac-Henry gets into a fight with fellow Year 11 Georgia, Jac-Henry is sent to isolation for a period of time. Though he is usually a well-behaved and bright pupil, his anger bursts are a letdown for him. Though Jac-Henry receives anger management, he soon gets excluded after a fight with another student who had been teasing him, and despite his ever-loyal friends advocating for him in front of Mr. Mitchell, he accepts his punishment, and Mr. Mitchell respects him. Meanwhile, prom is approaching at Thornhill, and for Georgia, being able to go to it is a challenge. Her boisterous, defiant behaviour causes concern for the staff, and this has been the case throughout her time at the school, having been excluded six times. Unfortunately for her, she is not allowed to go, though understands why. Both pupils leave the school with a good number of GCSEs.
10	Episode 3	19 September 2013	3.90
This episode focuses on two very different yet very similar pupils. Tom, in Year 10, has a good sense of humour but lacks in classwork. He favours English, as he likes his teacher there, who always tries to help him. Likewise, Year 7 Robbie-Joe is distracting in class and frequently late. His form teacher, Ms Uren, tries to get him back on track. Soon after, Tom is hit with big news; his step-brother has died. Despite this news, Tom proceeds to come into school. Tom is upset, and this is shown in his behaviour, and teachers are informed they should try to treat him nicely, though this proves difficult. Meanwhile, Ms Uren invites Robbie-Joe's mum into school, and tells Robbie-Joe that if he gets no bad mentions that week, he will be rewarded. Shortly after, the staff are pleased when Tom's behaviour improves significantly. Despite missing his brother hugely, he insists he will continue his hard work for the future.
11	Episode 4	26 September 2013	3.43
Safiyyah and Hadiqa are two very different people, yet they are friends at Thornhill. Hadiqa, though friendly and intelligent, is new to Thornhill. As this is her eighth school, she never had the opportunity to make friends. Safiyahh, though less academically gifted, is still a firm friend of Hadiqa's. Safiyyah's group of friends immediately dislike Hadiqa, being indirectly mean to her. Over the next few days, Hadiqa is not in school due to a relative dying. Rumours spread that Hadiqa and Safiyyah have fallen out, and Safiyahh receives a phone call from an unknown person, immediately blaming Hadiqa. Though Hadiqa tries to resolve this, Safiyahh now refuses to be friends with her, so much so to the point that Hadiqa throws a table over. Eventually, Hadiqa and Safiyyah patch up their turbulent relationship and continue to be friends. Though Safiyyah missed getting a C in English by one mark, she still hopes to become an air hostess.
12	Episode 5	3 October 2013	3.34
Mr. Moses is the dedicated leader of Year 9, and Grant, a pupil in his year, proves a challenge for him. He smokes outside of class, which is frequent, as he rarely turns up anyway. Grant has one of the worst behaviour records of the school, and with his home life only making things worse, Grant still does not settle down. Meanwhile, Mr. Moses is looking for a romantic partner online, and he has appeared to find a match. Mr. Moses eventually gets through to Grant, and he goes from having one of the worst records to one of the best. Mr. Moses breaks up with his partner, though, but has found another one.
13	Episode 6	10 October 2013	3.69
Mr. Steer, a determined maths teacher and deputy head, tries to help his new Year 11 class get a passing grade in maths. A group of four girls, including Sheridan, a popular yet somewhat bad-tempered girl, are new to his class. Sheridan is the main focus of this episode, due to her hard work yet distraction in maths and hatred of geography. Mr Steer is also a focus of this episode, due to his extreme hard work and many allergies. Despite Mr. Mitchell's pleas for him to go to the hospital after he is left struggling to walk, he stays at the school to continue teaching the Year 11s. Meanwhile, it is revealed that Sheridan got an A in her geography GCSE coursework, stunning her. Mr. Steer comes to school after a trip to the hospital. Despite being advised to stay home, he carries on work for his Year 11 maths class. After the crucial exam, it is shown that Sheridan failed her exam by four per cent, however, Mr. Steer tells her he will continue to tutor her in maths, and she thanks him for his work. Mr. Steer also points out that she made outstanding progress in the subject, going from being unsatisfactory to just below C.
14	Episode 7	17 October 2013	3.48
A Year 9 boy named Jack is new to Thornhill. It is noted that his family have travelled around a lot, so Jack never really got the chance to settle down. Because of this, Jack is rarely in lessons and when he is, he causes problems as he struggles to control his temper. Despite being a problem, he is particularly interested in History and tries to concentrate more in this area. Jack also says he is family oriented and evades school to be with his family. Mrs. Marsden, head of Pastoral Care and head of Year 7 at Thornhill, also plays a major part in this episode, helping pupils out. Jack is soon to pick his GCSE options, and it is unsure whether Jack will be allowed to pick History, as though it is the only subject he is particularly interested in, his lack of general concentration causes a problem, History is one of the most popular options and his expected grade is fairly low. Following several conversations with Mrs. Marsden and Mr. Burton, and time in the school's inclusion centre, Jack's behaviour significantly improves. Due to Mr. Steer and History teacher Mr. Giffin, he is allowed to pick History, and he is extremely happy because of this. Since filming, it is shown that Jack has left Thornhill to be closer to family.
15	Episode 8	24 October 2013	3.53
English teacher Mr. Burton deals with his most challenging class, including Musharaf, a kind but shy pupil with an acute stammer, trying to get a C in English. Musharaf was made a prefect, however, due to a Facebook post, lost this privilege, making his stutter more noticeable. Another pupil this episode focuses on is Hannah, who regularly evades class. During the time revising for his English speaking GCSE, Mr Burton finds an unusual yet extremely effective way of making Musharaf have a less obvious stutter. Mr. Mitchell informs him that he has earned the privilege of being a prefect, which delights him. As it is the end of the year for Year 11s, all is tearful as Mr. Mitchell and the staff give an assembly, inviting Musharaf to the front to give a speech. At the end of the episode, it is revealed that Musharaf got a C in English, which prompts him to hugely thank Mr. Burton.
16	Episode 9: "Educating Yorkshire at Christmas"	19 December 2013	2.75
Channel 4 goes back to school at Thornhill Community Academy to catch up with some of the best-loved characters from Educating Yorkshire. They're a year older and a whole range of things have changed for the pupils: troublemakers have turned around their reputations; love is in the air; and new challenges are faced at school and college.
17	Episode 10: "One Year On"	21 August 2014	2.24
One year on we'll revisit the charismatic teachers and pupils who made an impact on the nation in Educating Yorkshire. Where are they now? A lot can happen in a year, particularly when you're a teenager. We revisit Musharaf, who stole the hearts of the nation by overcoming his stammer. Now at college, is he on track to fulfil his ambition to become a teacher? Sheridan is learning to drive and is finally hoping to get that elusive grade C in Maths having re-sat the exam a year after leaving Thornhill.

== Production ==
Educating Yorkshire was commissioned by Channel 4 after the success of Educating Essex two years previously. There was interest from about 100 schools in starring in the new series after the production team put a call out to all schools classed as "good" or "outstanding" by Ofsted. David Brindley, producer and director of the series, said "it was undoubtedly easier to find a school this time around". In January 2012, Jonny Mitchell, the headmaster of Thornhill Community Academy in Dewsbury accepted an offer to be a part of a new series based in his school. The school had had a bad reputation and was among the 6% of the worst performing schools in England, with a 2007 Ofsted report describing it as "below average". Mitchell became headmaster in September 2011 and in 2012 it became the most improved school in the Yorkshire area and reached the top 6% of schools nationally. That year, 63% of pupils attained five GCSEs grade A* to C, up 7% since 2011 and only one of the 2012 graduates is not in education, employment or training. This improvement was one of the reasons it was chosen for the series with Mitchell saying "I was proud of what we’d achieved and felt we had a story to tell". Mitchell also said "Dewsbury has suffered quite a lot in the last ten or 15 years with some adverse press. I thought this was an opportunity for us to show the positive side of the town as well".

The show was recorded with 64 cameras rigged up across the school and turned on from 7 am to 5 pm. These were backed up by several handheld cameras and 22 radio microphones. It took six months of preparation before filming began. Parents and pupils were consulted and production staff and psychologists carried out 100 home visits as well as holding parents' evenings and special assemblies. Taking part was not compulsory and 16 pupils out of the school's 747 asked not to appear in the series, with another 30–40 parents requesting that their children feature only in the background.

Before filming began Twofour advised Mitchell to get into contact with Vic Goddard, headmaster of Passmores Academy, the school in which Educating Essex was set. He gave Mitchell advice on handling the attention and stayed in contact throughout the filming process. Mitchell had several concerns about the project such as putting the pupils in a situation where they were going to be laughed at, ridiculed or mocked. Many faculty members also had reservations about taking part, fearing they would be made to look stupid. Deputy head Dale Barrowclough said the turning point was speaking to Goddard.

Two thousand hours of footage was recorded over seven weeks. Mitchell and the staff have said during the first few days of having cameras in their offices and classrooms they were mindful of what they did or said, but after they had got used to them they forget they were there, only occasionally remembering when they moved suddenly. David Brindley, one of the directors, said he was surprised how quickly the pupils forgot they were being filmed "for a day everyone was waving at the cameras, but we were surprised how little people played up after that. I thought we would be confronted by chewing gum on cameras every day, but no". Mitchell also warned pupils who might have been tempted to show off that the production staff would not put them in the final cut of the programme. Brindley said "he told them they had the best chance of getting on TV by being normal". Mitchell also claims there was no deterioration of behaviour across the Academy and based on the behaviour trawl, data, teaching and the pupils' results over the period the behaviour improved while the cameras were there.

Mitchell and Twofour met at least once a day to talk about the things the cameras has been following and ask Mitchell if he had any concerns or comments. He did not have any editorial control but the relationship with Twofour and Channel 4 enabled him to talk openly about things that might concern Mitchell and the staff, and their comments were taken into consideration when the final cut was made.

It was confirmed on 6 November 2013, that a Christmas special of Educating Yorkshire was to be broadcast which followed up on some of the featured pupils and how they are getting on after filming had finished. This later aired on 19 December 2013.

Additionally on 1 August 2014, Channel 4 announced that a new episode titled One Year On would be transmitted on 21 August 2014 that would see some of the pupils collect their GCSE results.

== Reception ==
According to BARB, Educating Yorkshire's first episode achieved over 4 million viewers, double the average audience of Educating Essex.

The series was well received by critics. Benjamin Secher of The Telegraph gave the show four out of five stars. Helen Pidd of The Guardian said "rather than making them look daft, Educating Yorkshire is a great advert for some truly excellent and inspirational teachers". Emily Jupp of The Independent reviewed the first episode saying "although this was not ground-breaking, it was occasionally funny and heart-warming". An article published in HuffPost called the teachers "heroes" and the pupils "pretty endearing" while Metro News gave the show four out of five stars.

Terry Payne of Radio Times was more critical of the series, claiming it was exploiting the pupils and was too focused on Georgia in the second episode, saying "the argument is not whether she should be featured, but whether an entire episode should be structured around her misbehaviour", adding that it had turned the documentary into a soap opera.

The final episode received critical acclaim, with social media raising the pupils featured in the episode as well as the inspirational teachers and head of years. The Metro stated: "Not a dry eye in the house as Educating Yorkshire draws to a close" in an article for the newspaper's entertainment section.

In January 2014, the show won Most Popular Documentary Series at the National Television Awards.
