= Educating the East End =

- Series 3
- No. of episodes: 8

Release
- Original network: Channel 4
- Original release: 4 September – 23 October 2014

Series chronology
- ← Previous; Series 2 Next → Series 4

Educating the East End is the third series of the British documentary television programme Educating broadcast on Channel 4. The eight-episode first series was first broadcast from 4 September 2014. Its format is based on the BAFTA Award-winning 2011 series Educating Essex and the National Television Award-winning 2013 series, Educating Yorkshire. It follows the everyday lives of the staff and students of Frederick Bremer School in East London which is a comprehensive secondary school.

== Episodes ==
No. overall	Episode	Original release date	UK viewers (millions)
18	Episode 1	4 September 2014	2.70
Educating returns for a new series at a new school in London, celebrating the same universal themes of adolescence, learning and friendships. This episode meets the school's newest English teacher, Mr Joseph Bispham, who is brand new to teaching, and struggles with his Year 9 class, especially vocal student Tawny. Headteacher Ms Smith informs him that this class will be inspected by her as he is a new teacher. Tawny secretly applies to go to the BRIT School, which focuses on performing arts for Year 10, with her best friend also applying to go. Mr Bispham, however, inadvertently reveals Tawny has planned to apply, though he did not know this himself, and this his relationship with Tawny is strained. Meanwhile, fellow Year 9 Acacia gets into trouble for uploading a nude photo of a girl she dislikes. She originally receives a detention, though this is altered after she tells headteacher Ms Smith that she was planning to see her mother that day, whom is very ill in hospital. During the Year 9 options evening, her mother is let out of hospital, despite the doctors advising her to stay in the hospital. Ms Smith inspects the class, though Mr Bispham accidentally causes Acacia to start crying by reminding her of her mother, whom is still gravely ill. It is also revealed that Tawny was not accepted, though her friend was. Mr Bispham, however, tells Tawny he is happy she did not go, as he would've missed her in his class. Mr Bispham also is revealed to have performed well in his inspection of the class, delighting him.
19	Episode 2	11 September 2014	2.26
This episode focuses on the boys, and Head Teacher Jenny Smith is determined to set two strong-minded pupils from either end of the school off on the right path. Year 8 Halil is noted to be a very bright pupil, though at the same time lacks concentration. He lashes out at another girl after she insults his haircut, and ends up having to be restrained by a teacher. He is promptly given punishment. Over the next few weeks he continues to misbehave, even being involved in an incident which involves the police, and is continually taken home by his granddad, a retired Cypriot police detective himself. Halil admits he does not like being taken home by him, as he feels guilty. Another focus of the episode is strong-minded Year 10 student Lamar. An aspiring football player, Lamar loses focus in other lessons as he believes that they will not be relevant for his football plans. Assistant Head Mr Palombo and PE teacher Mr Abberley work hard to convince him not to keep all his eggs in one basket.
20	Episode 3	18 September 2014	2.10
This episode follows the elections of the new year 10 Head boy and Head girl. Election fever is running high. There are posters, election videos and canvassing for votes, for a range of candidates offering very different qualities. We also meet the previous head girl; Maliaka, who wasn't your conventional head girl; as in her time at Fredrick Bremer, she didn't have the best behavior record. Teachers describe her as a 'rough diamond'. We follow four students as they bid to become Fredrick Bremer's new head boy and girl: Dike, Rashidah, Sheneil and the relatively unknown Joshua.
21	Episode 4	25 September 2014	1.97
Episode 4 focuses on two siblings, Year 10 Jebb and Year 9 Summer, who have been having problems at home. These start to have a noticeable impact on their work and behaviour in school. Jebb usually works well in English with Mr Bispham, due to his interest in Shakespeare, but he struggles to control his temper and he is regularly in trouble with Ms Smith, putting his place at school under serious scrutiny. Meanwhile Summer also struggles to be nice to her teachers, resenting the fact that she cannot escape questions about her home life at school. Summer seriously considers moving schools as a result of this. Pastoral worker Hazel works closely with both Jebb and Summer in a desperate attempt to keep them both on track.
22	Episode 5	2 October 2014	1.91
In this episode we meet three young men in different stages in their time at Fredrick Bremer. We meet Year 7 Louie, who is new to the school, and has trouble making friends; and as a result, starts to de-focus. But we see the pastoral worker Miss Austin helping him making friends and settling in. We also see fellow Year 7 Devonté, who is a fan of rap music. Despite this, Devonté spends much his time caring for his mother; and starts to relax in school, landing him in trouble. And lastly, Charlie, who's 16, is one of the top students in Year 11, but the pressure of exams is resulting in panic attacks. He finds that playing music with his band helps him relax, and goes on to perform in the school talent show.
23	Episode 6	9 October 2014	1.80
Year 11s Paige, Yasmine and Georgia are all good mates and part of one of the school's most recognisable cliques. All are predicted to leave Frederick Bremer with good GCSE grades. However, a major weakness of the group is their dependence on boys. When Paige finds out that her former crush, Jordan, is taking Yasmine to the prom, the two girls fall out and the group disintegrates. This puts their grades into jeopardy. PE teacher Miss Winter has always been someone the girls rely on for advice and she works hard to resolve the problem and reunite the group. Georgia's sister Gabby is in year 7 and Georgia is worried that she is trying to grow up too fast because of her new found obsession with makeup and desire to appear defiant to her teachers. Georgia enlists Miss Winter's help in getting Gabby on the right path and not to throw away her life whilst she's still so young.
24	Episode 7	16 October 2014	1.66
This episode focuses on two Year 11 boys who face their final GCSE exams. Oscar is an exceptionally bright, well mannered, witty student, capable of straight As. But he struggles to motivate himself and lacks confidence in his writing ability. History teacher Ms Higgins is concerned that he will realise the importance of producing written work too late and works hard to try and encourage him. Paris plays the stereotypical role of the class clown in most of his lessons, as he finds it hard to admit when he needs help. His frustration gets the better of him when he's involved in a fight with a fellow pupil in the library, resulting in the temporary banning of Year 11 from the library. Paris is lucky not to get excluded but, despite the best efforts of English teacher Mr Skinner, his behaviour in lessons still does not improve. Mr Skinner ends up having to threaten removing Paris from his class in an effort to get him working.
25	Episode 8	23 October 2014	N/A
It's the end of another school year at Frederick Bremer, but while teachers and pupils alike may have the summer holidays to look forward to, the staff's immediate priority is preparing the students for life beyond the school gates. The final episode focuses on the autism provision, and meets the team who put the hard work into creating such a diverse school community. Christopher is a Year 10 student and one of a handful of the school's children living with autism. He has been a hit with teachers and fellow students with his constant smiling, upbeat attitude and his `keep positive' motto, and home support worker Miss Austin explains the impact this one pupil has had on the rest of the school. Last in the series.

== Production ==
Educating the East End was commissioned by Channel 4 after the success of Educating Yorkshire in 2013 and Educating Essex in 2011.

Ten sixty-minute episodes were commissioned; the first eight were shown from September to October 2014 with the other two episodes acting as specials. The original title for the series was Educating Walthamstow but shortly before transmission the title was changed to Educating the East End.

Before filming began Twofour advised Smith to get into contact with the headteachers of Educating Essex and Educating Yorkshire. They both reportly gave advice on handling the attention and stayed in contact throughout the filming process.

== Reception ==
After the first episode was broadcast, The Guardian gave a favourable review, calling the show "funny, moving and inspirational". The Daily Telegraph also gave the show a good review rating it 4 out of 5 stars and saying "it was charming and found the power of stories".
