= Educating... =

British television programme

- Genre: Entertainment; Documentary; Reality television
- Created by: Twofour
- Directed by: David Clews; Nicola Brown; Alex Kohler
- Starring: Various students and teachers
- Voices of: David Clews
- Country of origin: United Kingdom
- Original language: English
- No. of series: 7
- No. of episodes: 47 (list of episodes)

Production
- Executive producers: Andrew MacKenzie-Betty; Peter Moore; David Clews
- Editors: Jonno; Paul
- Camera setup: Multi camera; Dual cameras
- Running time: 60 minutes (inc. adverts)
- Production company: Twofour

Original release
- Network: Channel 4
- Release: 22 September 2011 – 17 November 2020
- Release: 31 August 2025 – present

Related
- Our School

Educating... is a British documentary reality television programme airing on Channel 4 which first aired on 22 September 2011. It uses a fly-on-the-wall format to show the everyday lives of the staff and pupils of secondary schools all over the UK.

In 2025, 12 years since the first installment, the series returns to Thornhill Community Academy in Thornhill, West Yorkshire and a second series of Educating Yorkshire was broadcast from August to October 2025.

== Series overview ==
Series	Title	Episodes	Originally released		Average viewers (millions)
Series	Title	Episodes	First released	Last released	Average viewers (millions)
1	Essex	7	22 September 2011	3 November 2011	1.99
2	Yorkshire	10	5 September 2013	21 August 2014	3.46
3	The East End	8	4 September 2014	23 October 2014	1.44
4	Cardiff	8	25 August 2015	13 October 2015	1.71
5	Greater Manchester	8	31 August 2017	19 October 2017	2.54
6	Greater Manchester 2	4	3 November 2020	17 November 2020	1.81
7	Yorkshire 2	8	31 August 2025	19 October 2025	TBD

=== Series 1 (2011) ===
Educating Essex was commissioned by Channel 4's commissioning editor for documentaries, Mark Raphael, after the channel pledged an extra £6.7 million to documentary programming in 2011. It is similar to other fly-on-the-wall series broadcast by Channel 4 such as One Born Every Minute, 24 Hours in A&E, The Hotel and The Family, the last of which both director David Clews and series producer Beejal-Maya Patel had previously worked on.

=== Series 2 (2013–14) ===
Educating Yorkshire was commissioned by Channel 4 after the success of Educating Essex two years previously. There was interest from about 100 schools in starring in the new series. David Brindley, producer and director of the series, said "it was undoubtedly easier to find a school this time around". In January 2012, Jonny Mitchell, the headmaster of Thornhill Community Academy in Dewsbury accepted an offer to be a part of a new series based in his school. The school had had a bad reputation, ranking in the sixth percentile of English schools. Mitchell became headmaster in September 2011; in 2012 it reached the 94th percentile. This improvement was one of the reasons it was chosen for the series with Mitchell saying "I was proud of what we'd achieved and felt we had a story to tell". Mitchell also said "Dewsbury has suffered quite a lot in the last ten or 15 years with some adverse press. I thought this was an opportunity for us to show the positive side of the town as well".

=== Series 3 (2014) ===
Educating the East End was commissioned by Channel 4 after the success of Educating Yorkshire in 2013 and Educating Essex in 2011. The documentary followed a school in East London's Walthamstow. Ten sixty-minute episodes were commissioned; the first eight were shown from September to October 2014 with the other two episodes acting as specials. The original title for the series was Educating Walthamstow but shortly before transmission the title was changed to Educating the East End.

=== Series 4 (2015) ===
The follow-up to Educating the East End was announced by Channel 4 on 9 December 2014. Producers had looked to schools in Scotland, Ireland and Wales for the new series before settling on Willows High School in Cardiff. Executive producer David Clews revealed "you can really feel the charm and character of the place as soon as you walk through the gates and start talking to the students". Joy Ballard initially declined TwoFour's invitation before changing her mind a month later. In preparation for the programme she took advice from Johnny Mitchell, head of Thornhill Community Academy in Educating Yorkshire. The first six weeks of production saw the documentary makers observing the school and "picking up stories". Filming began in October and lasted until Christmas.

=== Series 5 (2017) ===
After the fourth series of the Educating series ended it was announced that the series would be shelved till 2017 to give the show a break and a rest. It was announced on 22 December 2016 by Channel 4 that the Educating series would be returning in 2017 with a fifth series after a two-year break. The series was again filmed using fly-on-the-wall cameras and filmed the lives of teachers and students. The fifth series was filmed in Salford, Greater Manchester. The first trailer was released on 30 August 2017 with the series premiering on 31 August 2017 on Channel 4.

=== Series 6 (2020) ===
Channel 4 confirmed in January 2018 that the Educating programme was renewed for two further series. For the first time, the series would return to the same school for the sixth and seventh series, in Manchester. The sixth and seventh series were set to be filmed back to back, with the sixth series set to comprise 16 hour-long episodes. However, after the school was placed into special measures by Ofsted in 2018 following reports of headmaster Drew Povey off-rolling students, Channel 4 later confirmed that the episodes would not be aired in light of the findings. In 2020, it was revealed that Channel 4 would air the unaired episodes, beginning at 9:15pm on 3 November. The unaired episodes have been promoted as being a second series of Educating Greater Manchester.

=== Series 7 (2025) ===
In July 2024 Channel 4 announced that it would reboot the Educating series after being axed back in 2020. The seventh series saw the show return to Thornhill Community Academy in Yorkshire. This was the second time the series returned to a previous school. The series was filmed over the 2024/2025 academic year and first aired on 31 August 2025 on Channel 4.

=== Series 8 (TBC) ===
Channel 4 announced in July 2026 that it would return to Thornhill Community Academy in Yorkshire for a third time.

== Awards and nominations ==
Year	Award	Category	Result
2012	British Academy of Film and Television Arts	Television Craft and Director Factual	Won
2014	National Television Awards	Documentary	Won

== Spin-off series ==
A spin-off series was made after the second series titled Educating: What I Wish I'd Known.... Each episode features a student from either series one or series two of Educating.... The series was made up of six seven-minute episodes. The tagline was "What is the advice you wish you could have given your teenage self?" Filmed in 2014, this series asks students from Educating Essex and Educating Yorkshire what they would have told their younger selves. However, the series was cancelled after one series.
