= Educating Essex =

- Series 1
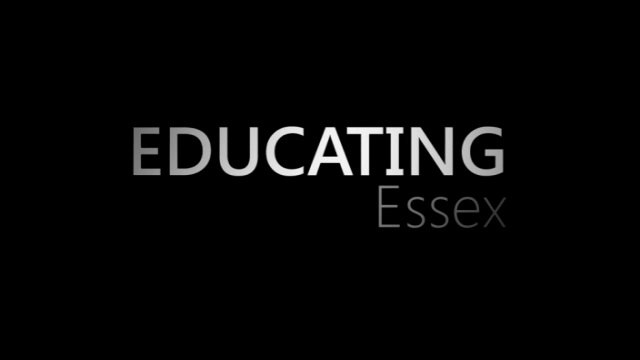
- No. of episodes: 7

Release
- Original network: Channel 4
- Original release: 22 September – 3 November 2011

Series chronology
- Next → Series 2

Educating Essex is the first series of the British documentary television programme Educating produced by Twofour for Channel 4 that ran for seven episodes from September to November 2011 (which were produced within the 2010-2011 academic year). The series was originally titled "The School" and uses a fly on the wall format to show the everyday lives of the staff and pupils of Passmores Academy, a secondary school in Harlow, Essex, interspersed with interviews of those involved and featuring narration from the director and interviewer, David Clews.

The series received mixed media coverage: it was largely praised for its insight into the lives and behaviour of teenagers and the education system, but was also criticised for its depiction of pupils and teachers using profanity, as well as bullying and teenage pregnancy. The show received numerous awards, including director David Clews's British Academy Television Craft Award for his work on the programme in 2012; in the same year, the show was nominated for a Grierson Award for "Best Documentary Series".

In 2013, Channel 4 and Twofour announced that the next series of the programme would be filmed in a different school, Thornhill Community Academy in Dewsbury, and that it would accordingly be titled Educating Yorkshire.

In 2014, Stephen Drew starred in his own series, Mr Drew's School for Boys.

== Episodes ==
No. overall	Episode	Original release date	UK viewers (millions)
1	Episode 1	22 September 2011	1.92
History teacher and deputy head Mr Drew must enforce the school's rules by confiscating banned items of clothing and holding detentions. He is shown interacting with the boisterous Charlotte. He also has a history class, which he enjoys teaching and is interrupted by colleagues because of his birthday. He annoys other staff by allowing pupils to throw snowballs at one another at break time "because it makes them happy". When Camelita arrives wearing a hoodie she refuses to remove, Drew confronts her: she is excluded for swearing at him. Later, when her parents are called, she claims that he assaulted her by grabbing her shoulder; this is proven to be false when head teacher Mr Goddard checks the CCTV footage. Camelita is reprimanded by Goddard and excluded until January.
2	Episode 2	29 September 2011	1.79
Head girl Gabby is being bullied by a group of her former friends. One night, she receives a series of menacing text messages from an unknown number. Mr Drew calls it and leaves a message saying that it will be passed on to the police. A text reveals that the texts were sent by Gabby's friend Chloe: she is pulled from a lesson, as is her mother, who works as a teaching assistant at the school. Chloe reveals that her older sister Grace told her what to write, and she is also pulled out of her lesson. The two are told off by their mother, and Gabby's family does not involve the police. Meanwhile, Sam – an odd misbehaving emo who struggles academically—gets into a dispute with Dean over his girlfriend, leading Dean's family to get involved and Sam to act aggressively towards Dean's sister and be excluded for a week. However, Mr Drew sees how upset the exclusion makes Sam (since it would mean breaking a promise to his mother), and replaces it with a week of afternoon school.
3	Episode 3	6 October 2011	2.01
Vinni, who was previously academically successful and well behaved before his parents split up, is getting worse: he wanders around corridors to avoid lessons, listens to rap music on the school computers instead of doing his coursework, and converses with his favourite teacher Miss Conway and head teacher Mr Goddard on how he has changed and is on the wrong path. One morning, Vinni is not in his school uniform when he arrives; he reveals that his mother made him leave home after he made his brother cry. This is confirmed to be true with a phone call home. Despite advice to reconcile with his mother, Vinni expresses a desire to Miss Conway to be taken into foster care, and this is arranged with Mr Goddard, who is clearly upset by this and wonders whether he could have taken actions earlier to prevent it. Meanwhile, Mr Drew confiscates cigarettes and Lucozade, and punishes pupils who have downloaded computer games into their school-assigned user space.
4	Episode 4	13 October 2011	2.11
Rumour spreads around Passmores that Thai girl Sky is pregnant: her boyfriend Liam is asked about this, and reveals that he is aware of the news and regrets having had unprotected sex. Mr and Mrs Goddard talk to Liam about dealing with a pregnant partner. Liam and Sky go for a prenatal ultrasound scan, where they learn that the baby will be a boy: Liam now "can't wait". Miss Conway deals with Luke, whose grandfather has recently died and who is struggling with his behaviour towards Mrs Goddard. After being rude to an examinations officer, Luke leaves a maths exam: Mr Drew talks to him about how the school is adapting to his current situation, and Luke storms out, taking this to mean his grandfather. Luke later spends less time in school, staying only for certain lessons such as science. Later, Sky has had her baby and obtained her GCSEs, and Luke is going on to a career in construction.
5	Episode 5	20 October 2011	2.05
Carrie and Ashleigh are two popular girls whose friendship holds together their social group: when they turn against each other, everyone is affected. Carrie struggles in Mr Thomas' maths class, exasperatedly exclaiming, "What is pi?" After school, Carrie is dyeing Ashleigh's hair when Ashleigh gets a call from her ex, Brad, whom she sits next to in Dr Nicolson's science class. Vinni, Brad's best friend, annoys Ashleigh by asking her about the status of her relationship with Brad. Later, Ashleigh finds that Carrie and her group have stopped talking to her, and they ignore her and spread rumours about her during a citizenship lesson. Ashleigh is off sick and appears to have vomited. Brad hears that Ashleigh is involved with another boy, and has to be dissuaded from confronting him by Miss Conway and put into isolation; this prompts further rumours. Three days later, Ashleigh comes back for revision classes and makes friends with some girls, but Carrie is still hostile towards her. After Ashleigh complains to Miss Conway about abusive text messages, the two are finally brought together, argue and settle their dispute.
6	Episode 6	27 October 2011	1.97
The bright Mollie is put on report to Mr Drew. Her elder sister Charlotte is sent out of a lesson, and the two argue in his office. Mr Drew describes how he deals with many such cases every day, and Mollie says that she and Mr Drew are similar people in that they are both assertively argumentative. They argue over Mollie's lack of a blazer; Drew will not allow her wearing her coat in lessons. Mollie arrives at school, not in her uniform. The police arrive to question her; the night before, she had argued with her mother, left home and been reported missing. She calls her mother, who says she will pick her up as normal. On Remembrance Day, Dr Nicolson extends his class's moment of silence for minutes longer than the rest of the school. Mollie is sent back to Mr Drew, whom she has an argument with when he will not give her her report. Mollie comes into school in make-up, and she and Mr Drew laugh as he tells her to remove it. Staff listen to music and discuss graffiti about themselves, and Mr Drew lists his role models. Mollie leaves her mobile phone on a bus and uses Mr Drew's phone to call her mother; Drew urges her to be nice.
7	Episode 7	3 November 2011	2.06
Thoughts turn to leaving school as new arrival Ryan, who has Asperger's, and Vinni, who is now living in a children's home, challenge the school. Vinni seems to be growing apart from school because of the lack of an obvious benefit, and Mr Goddard and Miss Conway attempt to get him to put in more effort. Ryan moved to Essex from Spain two years ago, where he was held back in school due to his special needs, and is studying GCSEs with the help of a teaching assistant. Despite his initial worries, he is a hit with the students, and gets on well with Mr Drew and Mr Goddard. During a SEN session, he is informed that he has been nominated for a Jack Petchey Award. Vinni does not like foster care and Miss Conway encourages him to improve his behaviour. He is taken off-timetable for three days to revise for his English exam, which he passes with a C. The production team encourages Ryan to go to the prom. Vinni arrives with a tramline in his haircut; as this style is banned by the school, he is put in isolation, but instead helps his friend with his homework; his behaviour is getting worse. On Leavers' Day, Vinni is not there, as he barely attended school in his final term. Ryan makes an unexpected speech about how his time there was the best of his life, which makes Mr Goddard and many pupils cry. On results day, Ryan gets an A in Spanish, and Vinni gets poor results, but good enough to start a plumbing course. Back in school, Mr Drew is heard telling another "young person" to remove their coat.

== Production ==
Educating Essex was commissioned by Channel 4's commissioning editor for documentaries, Mark Raphael, after the channel pledged an extra £6.7 million to documentary programming in 2011. It is similar to other fly-on-the-wall series broadcast by Channel 4 such as One Born Every Minute, 24 Hours in A&E, The Hotel and The Family, the last of which both director David Clews and series producer Beejal-Maya Patel had previously worked on.

After seeing a "quite dull" programme about schools on the BBC, Raphael was inspired to create a series which captured school the way "[he] remembered it". He chose Clews after watching The Family, which he found funny, an attribute he wanted his series to have. Clews was initially not keen on the school idea, as he thought it would be boring. However, he came round after visiting some, describing in particular how one pupil tried to pass off his mobile phone use as checking for testicular cancer.

Passmores Academy in Essex was chosen as the series' setting after the production team approached around 20 schools with good or outstanding Ofsted reports. This was eventually narrowed down to three after many denied or governors blocked the proposals. One of the schools that denied was Houghton Kepier School in Durham which had been given bad press in years previous after misconduct from staff member Adam Walker. David Clews stated that, "Passmores was always my favourite" as he hoped for "stories unfolding within the school". Regarding his decision to allow cameras into the school, Goddard said that upon receiving the phone call about the show, he had just given an assembly which encouraged pupils to take opportunities after the death of a classmate, and thought it would be "disingenuous" not to do so himself. Goddard received the support of the majority of Passmores governors, in particular by Community Governor Michael Hardware who, with previous documentary experience, provided some reassurance. Teacher Stephen Drew has described how he was initially very distrustful of the crew, and thought they were all "bastards" with "no morals" and "no sense of ethics", only wanting to make money. He did, however, begin to trust the team when they were honest with him and did not "cut any corners".

In order to make the series, over 60 cameras were installed on the school's premises during the October half-term and filmed for a period of seven weeks, monitored by crew members in on-site prefabricated buildings. Staff and pupils were also allocated 22 radio microphones, based on whomever the crew thought would provide the most interesting material. When the speech of those not wearing a microphone was included, it was often barely audible and was written out and overlaid on the screen. In all, the fixed cameras filmed over 1,000 hours of footage. In addition, the crew interviewed pupils in prefabricated classrooms, mainly at lunchtime and in groups to capture the "group dynamic feel" of school life. Members of the production team were also charged with gaining the trust of around 20 to 25 pupils by liaising and going home with them.

The autumn period was chosen as the production team thought it the most "normal" part of the year because the syllabus was being taught and pupils were not revising for their GCSE exams. As for fears that the presence of cameras would impact on pupils' behaviour, Clews said that pupils "mucked about" for the first few days, but soon forgot about the unobtrusive cameras. However, Goddard did not want to have cameras back, in case pupils began to misbehave because they were there; he said, "There's no media interest better than one young person's education". Channel 4 sought a new school to be filmed for a second series, and chose Thornhill Community Academy in Dewsbury to be the setting for Educating Yorkshire, to be filmed and broadcast in 2013.

== Themes ==
The series covers a wide range of heavy themes, including a false accusation of assault against teacher Mr Drew by Camelita in the first episode, a case of bullying which moves on to cyberbullying against Gabby in the second, Vinni being taken into foster care in episode three and episode four focusing on Sky's teenage pregnancy with her boyfriend Liam. Episode five concentrated on the power of gossip and rumours, as Carrie's and Ashleigh's friendship breaks up and they reconcile. The sixth episode returns to Mr Drew as he attempts to get Mollie and her sister Charlotte back on the right academic track. The final episode features Ryan, a new arrival at the school, who has Asperger syndrome and the Year 11 leaving and their GCSE results.

== Reception ==
According to BARB, Educating Essex averaged around 2 million viewers for each episode. This included a peak of 2.11 million for episode 4, and episode 2 being the lowest with only 1.79 million viewers.

The series received generally positive reviews from critics: Sam Wollaston of The Guardian praised the show, calling it "a lot more interesting than Jamie's Dream School", and commenting that Mr Drew's history class is better than that of famous historian David Starkey; Wollaston also compared the series to the structured reality show The Only Way Is Essex, calling Educating Essex a "pure, observational, unobtrusive documentary [...] kind of what you want in reality TV". Rachel Tarley of Metro praised the first episode in particular due to its depiction of Mr Drew, calling it "giddily enjoyable", and said the show was "the best thing on Channel 4 this year".

However, the series and participating Passmores Academy were criticised by The Telegraph, who said that those involved were portrayed in "an unflattering light", and criticised incidents in which teacher Mr King jokingly calls his pupils "scumbags", head teacher Mr Goddard uses an offensive hand gesture towards Mr Drew, and staff use profane language with one another. Nick Seaton, a spokesman for the Campaign for Real Education, criticised Passmores and its Ofsted rating, saying "If this is an outstanding school then it doesn't say much for the rest".

== Awards ==
In 2012 Educating Essex was shortlisted for the Broadcasting Press Guild Award for "Best Documentary Series", and director David Clews won a British Academy Television Craft Award in the "Director: Factual" category for his work on the programme; the show was also nominated for the BAFTA for "Factual Series" and the "Audience Award". Also in 2012, the show was awarded "Best New Television Series" at the Freesat Awards. Later on that year, senior producer–director Grace Reynolds won the award for "Producer or Director Debut" at the Guardian Edinburgh International Television Festival. In 2013, the programme won "Best Documentary Series" at the Broadcast Awards, and was also nominated for the Grierson Award for "Best Documentary Series".
