= Edworth Manor =

Manor house in Edworth, Central Bedfordshire, England, UK

Coordinates: 52.0520°N 0.2182°W

Edworth Manor was a manor in Bedfordshire, England. The manor was mentioned in the Domesday Book. The manor was owned in the 16th & 17th centuries by the Pygott and Hale families. There was a house in the manor, known as 'The Hall' which was home to the Spencer family. John Spencer (c.1505–68) and Ann Merrill (died 1560) leased the house and a farm in the 16th century.
